= Timeline of plesiosaur research =

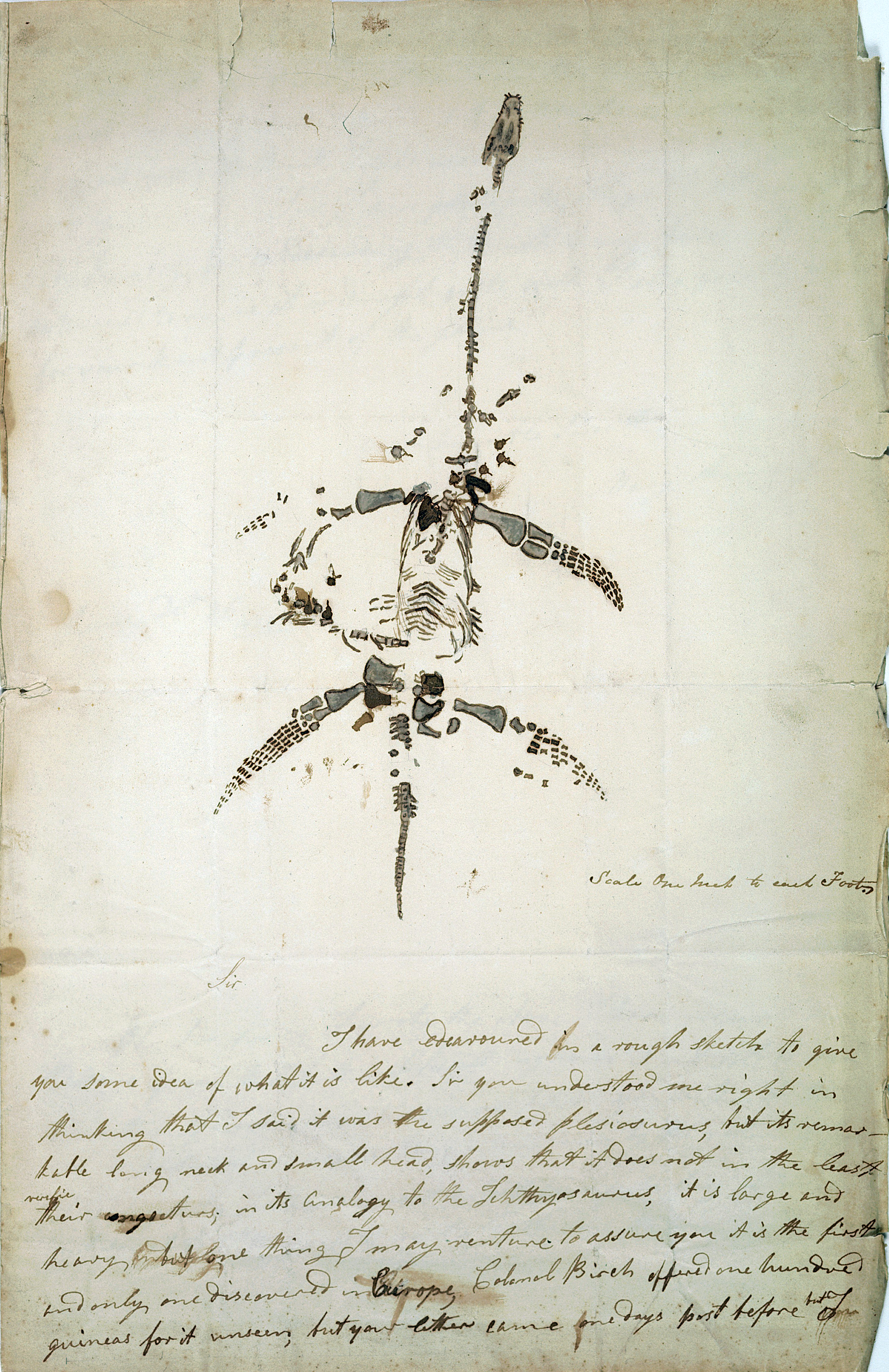
Letter concerning the discovery of the 1823 Plesiosaurus, from Mary Anning.

This timeline of plesiosaur research is a chronologically ordered list of important fossil discoveries, controversies of interpretation, taxonomic revisions, and cultural portrayals of plesiosaurs, an order of marine reptiles that flourished during the Mesozoic Era. The first scientifically documented plesiosaur fossils were discovered during the early 19th century by Mary Anning. Plesiosaurs were actually discovered and described before dinosaurs. They were also among the first animals to be featured in artistic reconstructions of the ancient world, and therefore among the earliest prehistoric creatures to attract the attention of the lay public. Plesiosaurs were originally thought to be a kind of primitive transitional form between marine life and terrestrial reptiles. However, now plesiosaurs are recognized as highly derived marine reptiles descended from terrestrial ancestors.

Early researchers thought that plesiosaurs laid eggs like most reptiles. They commonly imagined plesiosaurs crawling up beaches and burying eggs like turtles. However, later opinion shifted towards the idea that plesiosaurs gave live birth and never went on dry land: the biggest genera may have been too heavy to go on land at all, but smaller genera could've been capable. Plesiosaur locomotion has been a source of continuous controversy among paleontologists. The earliest speculations on the subject during the 19th century saw plesiosaur swimming as analogous to the paddling of modern sea turtles. During the 1920s opinion shifted to the idea that plesiosaurs swam with a rowing motion. However, a paper published in 1975 that once more found support for sea turtle-like swimming in plesiosaurs. This conclusion reignited the controversy regarding plesiosaur locomotion through the late 20th century. In 2011, F. Robin O'Keefe and Luis M. Chiappe concluded the debate on plesiosaur reproduction, reporting the discovery of a gravid female plesiosaur with a single large embryo preserved inside her.

== Prescientific ==
Associated remains of plesiosaurs and animals like the diving bird Hesperornis or the pterosaur Pteranodon may have inspired legends about conflict between Thunder Birds and Water Monsters told by the Native Americans of Kansas and Nebraska.

== 18th century ==
=== 1719 ===
- William Stukeley described the first partial skeleton of a plesiosaur, brought to his attention by the great-grandfather of Charles Darwin, Robert Darwin of Elston.

== 19th century ==
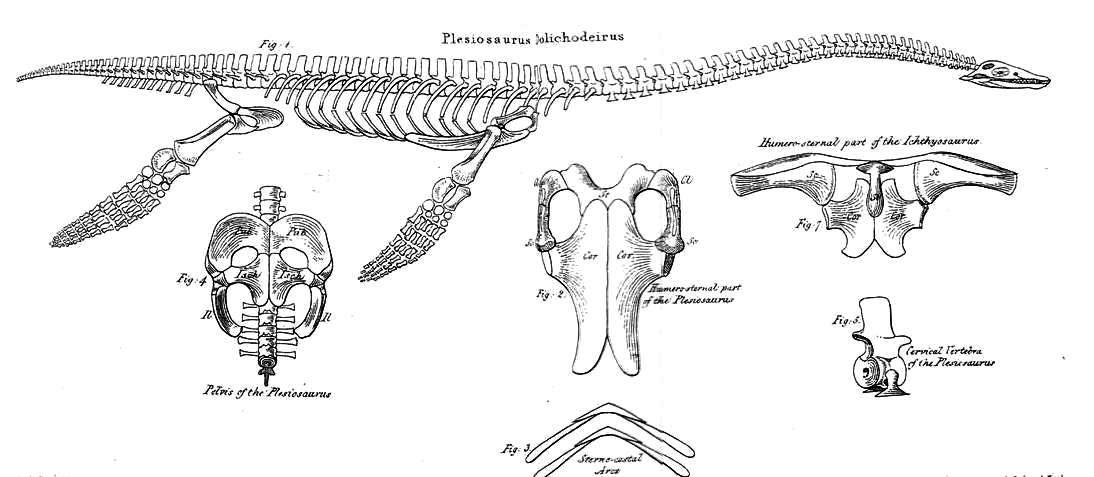
1824 skeletal reconstruction of Plesiosaurus by Henry De la Beche

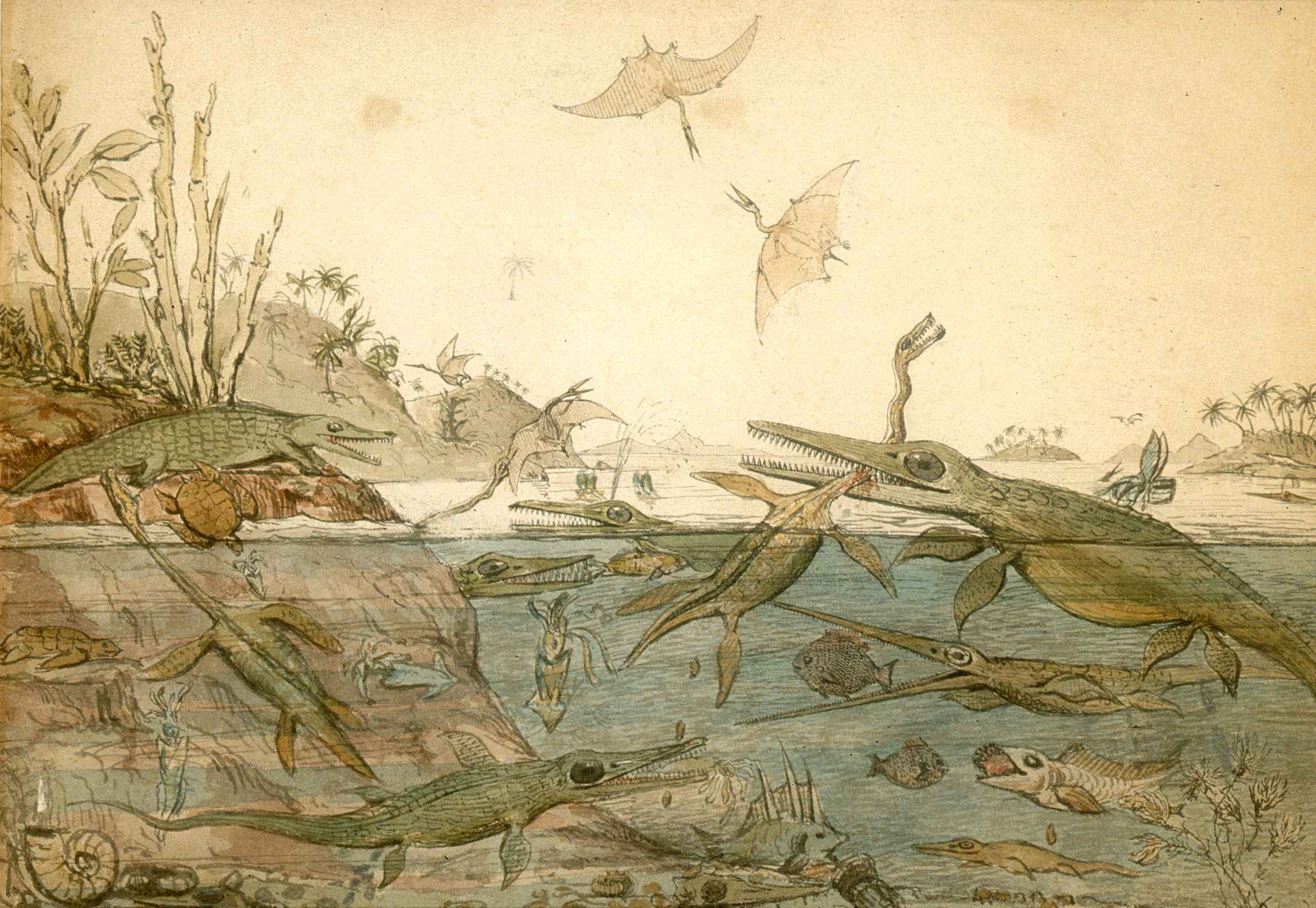
Duria Antiquior, the first artistic restoration of a Mesozoic ecosystem, features a Plesiosaurus being preyed upon by an Ichthyosaurus

=== 1810s ===
==== 1811 ====
- Mary Anning discovered some plesiosaur fossils in England.

=== 1820s ===
==== 1821 ====
- Henry De la Beche and William Conybeare are the first to name a plesiosaurian species: Plesiosaurus dolichodeirus.

==== 1822 ====
- Parkinson coined the name Plesiosaurus priscus for some of the remains used by de la Beche and Conybeare as the basis for Plesiosaurus. This species is currently regarded as of dubious taxonomic value.

==== 1823 ====
December

- Mary Anning discovered a nearly complete Plesiosaurus skeleton near Lyme Regis. This specimen would later be catalogued as BMNH 22656.

c. December

- Around the same time as the discovery of BMNH 22656, another Plesiosaurus specimen was discovered at the same site. The specimen was donated to the Oxford University museum and is probably the specimen known today as OXFUM J.10304.

==== 1824 ====
- Conybeare described the new species name Plesiosaurus dolichodeirus for the Plesiosaurus discovered by Anning. As the first species name given to a distinctive and well preserved Plesiosaurus skeleton it has come to be regarded as both the type specimen of Plesiosaurus dolichodeirus specifically and of the genus Plesiosaurus as a whole.

==== 1829 ====
- Mary Anning collected the Plesiosaurus dolichodeirus specimen now known as BMNH R.1313.

=== 1830s ===
==== 1837 ====
- Buckland in Conybeare described the new species Plesiosaurus macrocephalus.

==== 1839 ====
- De la Beche illustrated a work titled "Duria Antiquior", meaning "A More Ancient Dorset" for fossil hunter Mary Anning. This work, which prominently features plesiosaurs, has been regarded as the first attempt to accurately reconstruct the Mesozoic world through an artistic medium.
- von Meyer described Pistosaurus. Pistosaurus is believed to be a transitional form linking plesiosaurs to their basal sauropterygian forebears.

=== 1840s ===
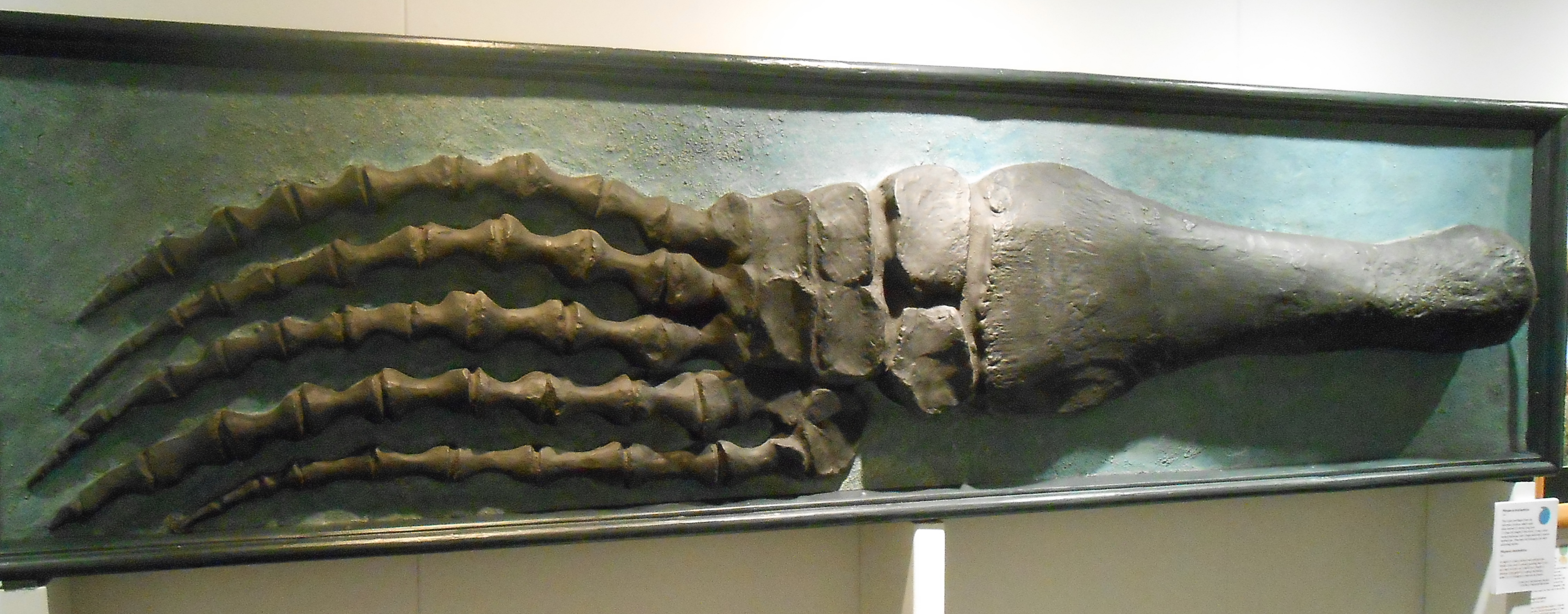
Cast of the flipper of Pliosaurus brachydeirus. The species was named by Owen in 1841.

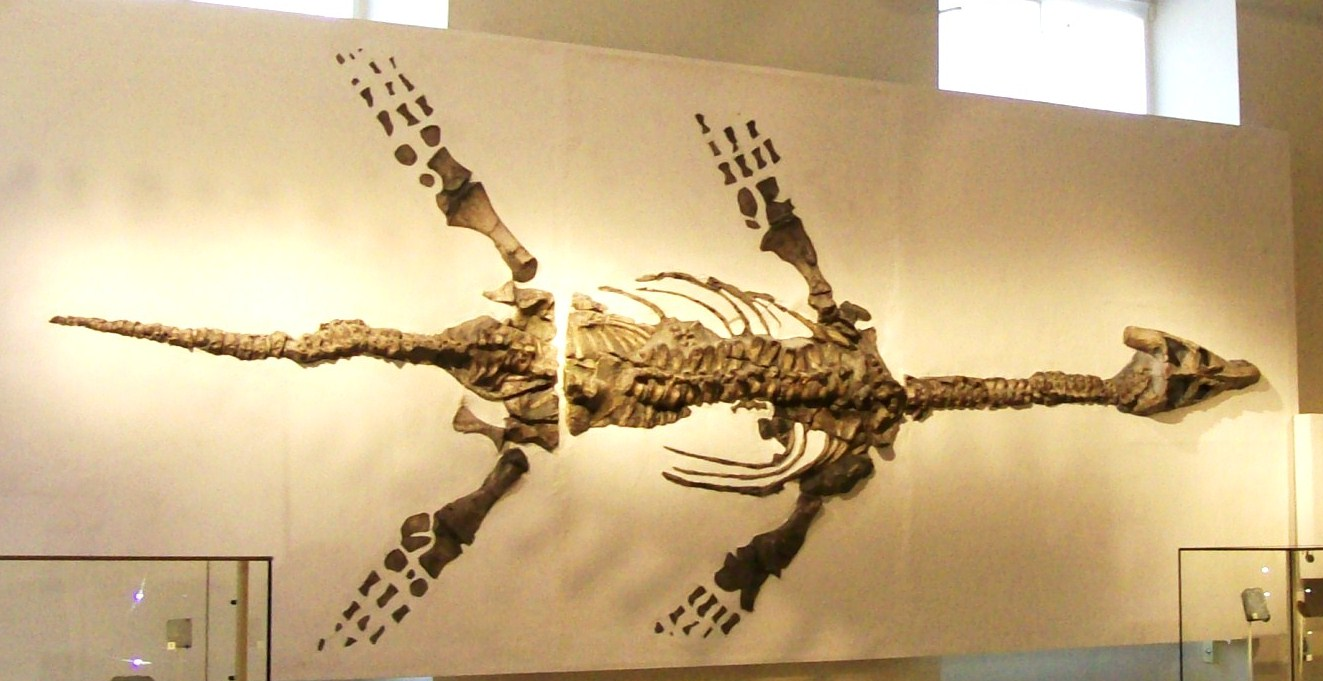
Skeleton of the "Barrow Kipper" Atychodracon megacephalus specimen

==== 1840 ====
- Owen described the species now known as Colymbosaurus trochanterius, Eurycleidus arcuatus, and Thalassiodracon hawkinsii.

==== 1841 ====
- Owen described the new species Pliosaurus brachydeirus, Pliosaurus brachyspondylus. and Polyptychodon interruptus.

==== 1842 ====
- Sir Richard Owen formally named the pliosaurs.

==== 1846 ====
- Stutchbury described the species now known as Atychodracon megacephalus.

==== 1848 ====
- The trustees of the British Museum of Natural History bought the type specimen of Plesiosaurus from the estate of the first duke of Buckingham, Richard Glenville. The museum catalogued the specimen as BMNH 22656.

=== 1860s ===
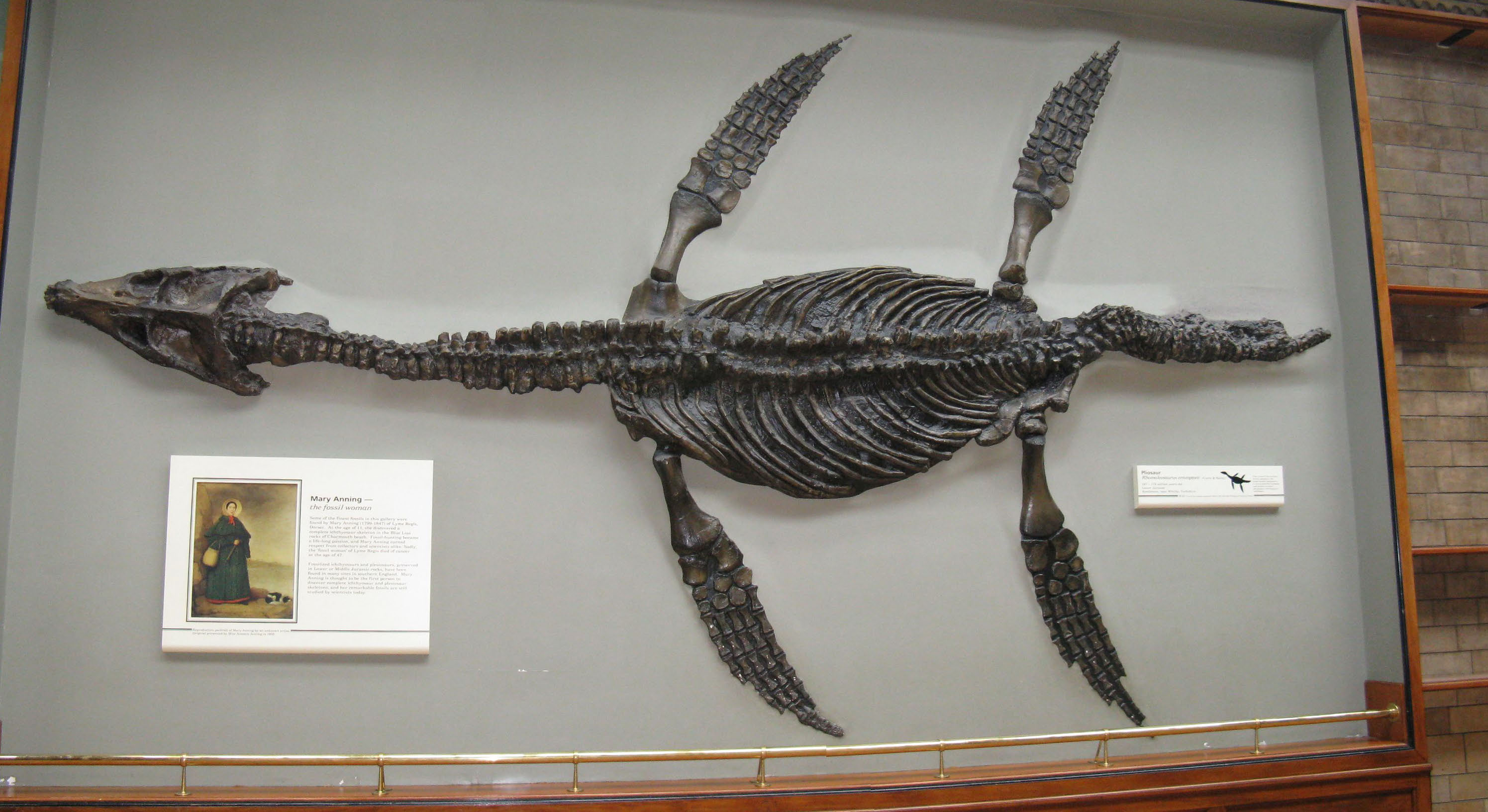
Skeleton of Rhomaleosaurus cramptoni. R. cramptoni was described by Carte and Baily in 1863.

==== 1863 ====
- Carte and Bailey described the species now known as Rhomaleosaurus cramptoni.

==== 1864 ====
- Jules Verne depicted a relict plesiosaur's defeat in combat against an ichthyosaur in Journey to the Center of the Earth.

==== 1865 ====
- Owen described the species now known as Eretmosaurus rugosus and Microcleidus homalospondylus.
- Seeley described the species now known as Microcleidus macropterus.
- Owen described the species now known as Archaeonectrus rostratus.

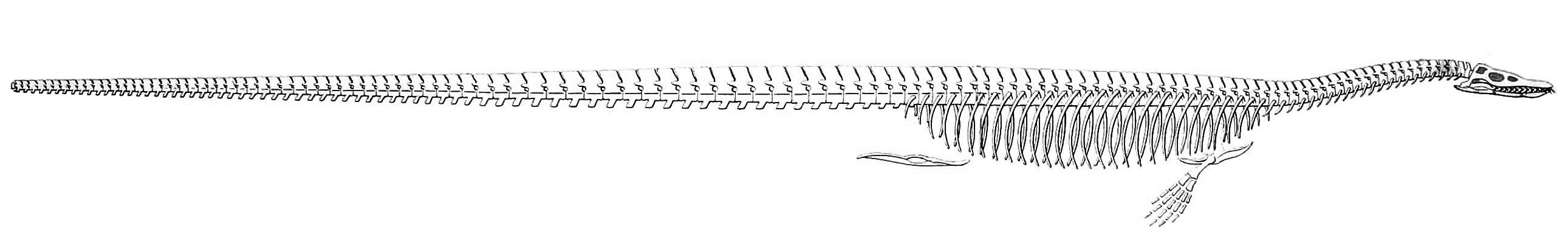
Edward Drinker Cope's head-on-the-wrong-end skeletal reconstruction of Elasmosaurus platyurus.

==== 1867 ====
- An army surgeon named Dr. Theophilus Turner discovered the fossils of a large animal in the Pierre Shale of Kansas, USA. The remains represented the first nearly complete plesiosaur specimen from North America. Turner gave some of its vertebrae to a member of the Union Pacific Railroad's survey named John LeConte. LeConte sent the vertebrae to Edward Drinker Cope for study. Cope recognized the find as a significant plesiosaur discovery and wrote to Turner asking him to excavate and ship the fossils to him.

March, mid

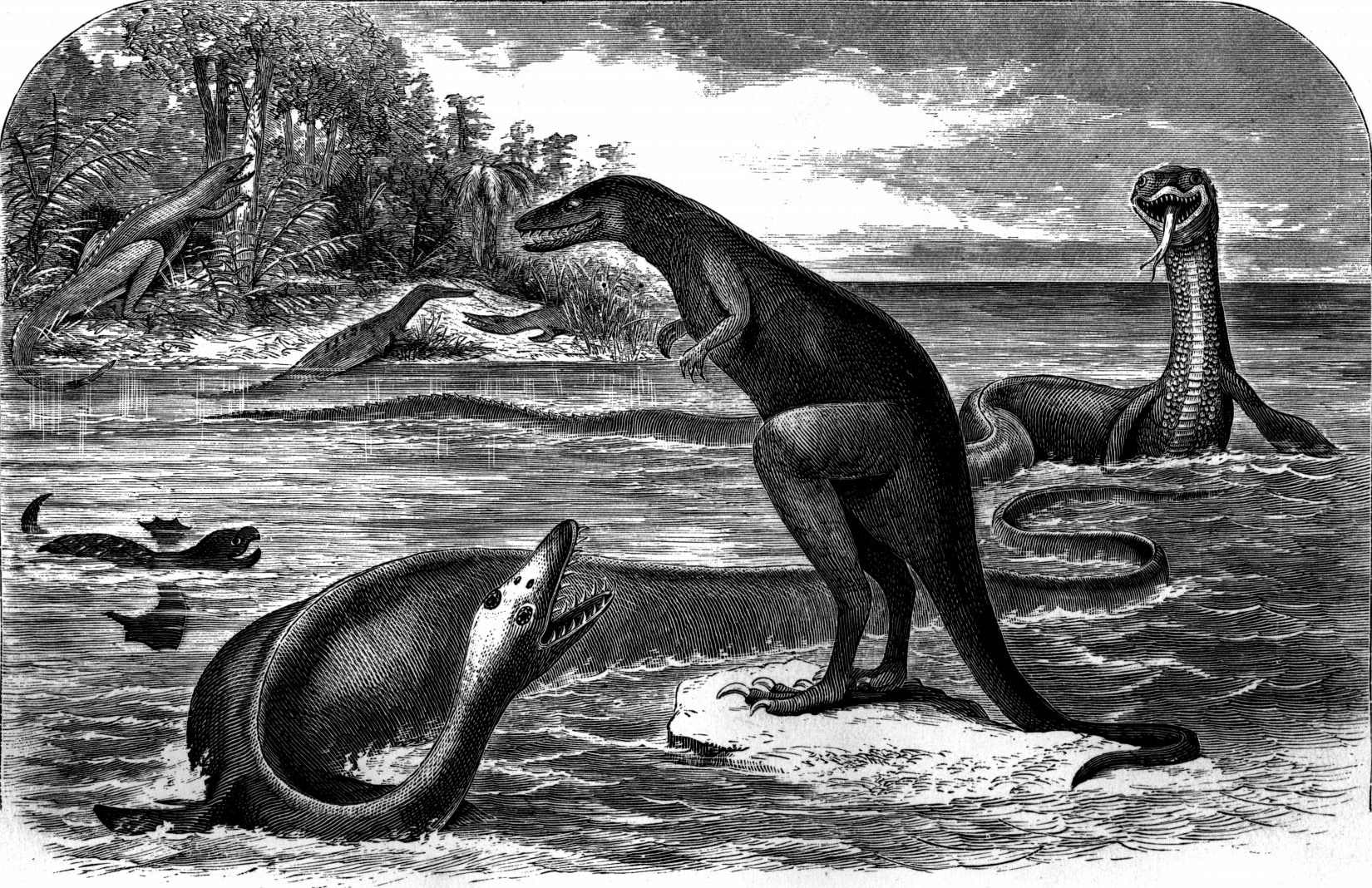
An 1869 life restoration of Elasmosaurus (with the head still on the wrong end) confronting the theropod dinosaur Laelaps (now Dryptosaurus) platyurus.

- Cope erected the new genus and species Elasmosaurus platyurus for the fossils sent by Turner in a rushed descriptive manuscript written within two weeks of obtaining them.

March 24

- Cope presented his findings regarding Elasmosaurus to a meeting of the Academy of Natural Sciences in Philadelphia, Pennsylvania.

==== 1868 ====
- Cope described the new species Elasmosaurus platyurus.
- Cope's description of Elasmosaurus was formally published.

September

- William E. Webb and others collected and shipped a plesiosaur specimen to Cope.

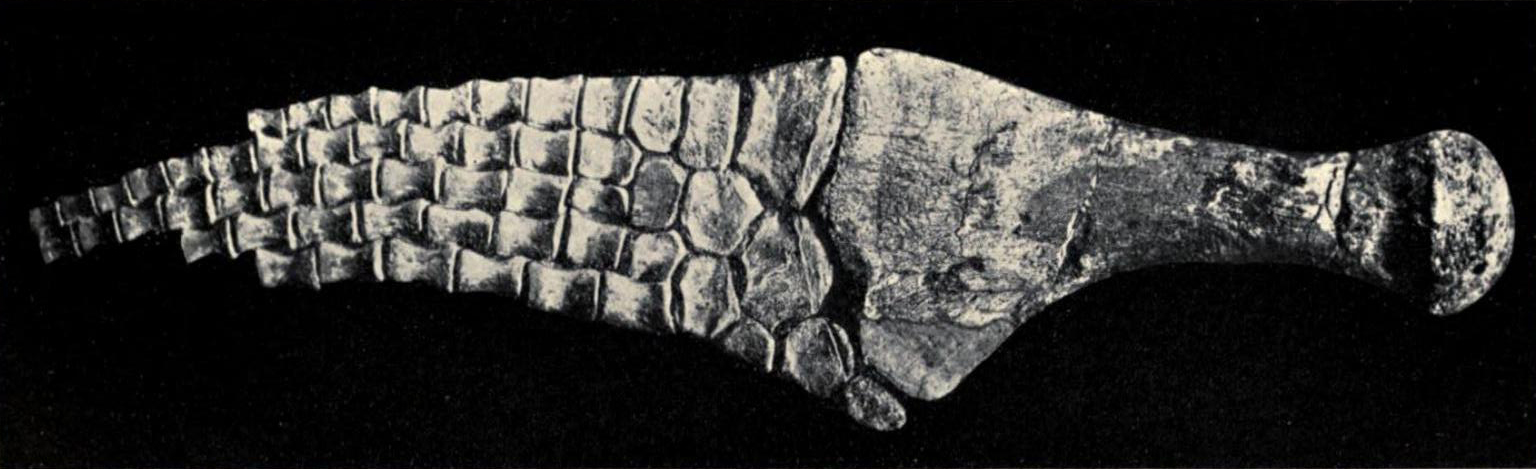
Flipper of Polycotylus latipinnis. P. latipinnis was described by Cope in 1869.

==== 1869 ====
- Seeley described the species now known as Liopleurodon pachydeirus and Peloneustes philarchus.
- Cope named the plesiosaur specimen collected by Webb Polycotylus latipinnis.

August

- Cope prepared a preprint for the Transactions of the American Philosophical Society of his Elasmosaurus description, including reconstruction of the animal with a short neck and very long tail. The manuscript was then distributed to other scholars.

=== 1870s ===
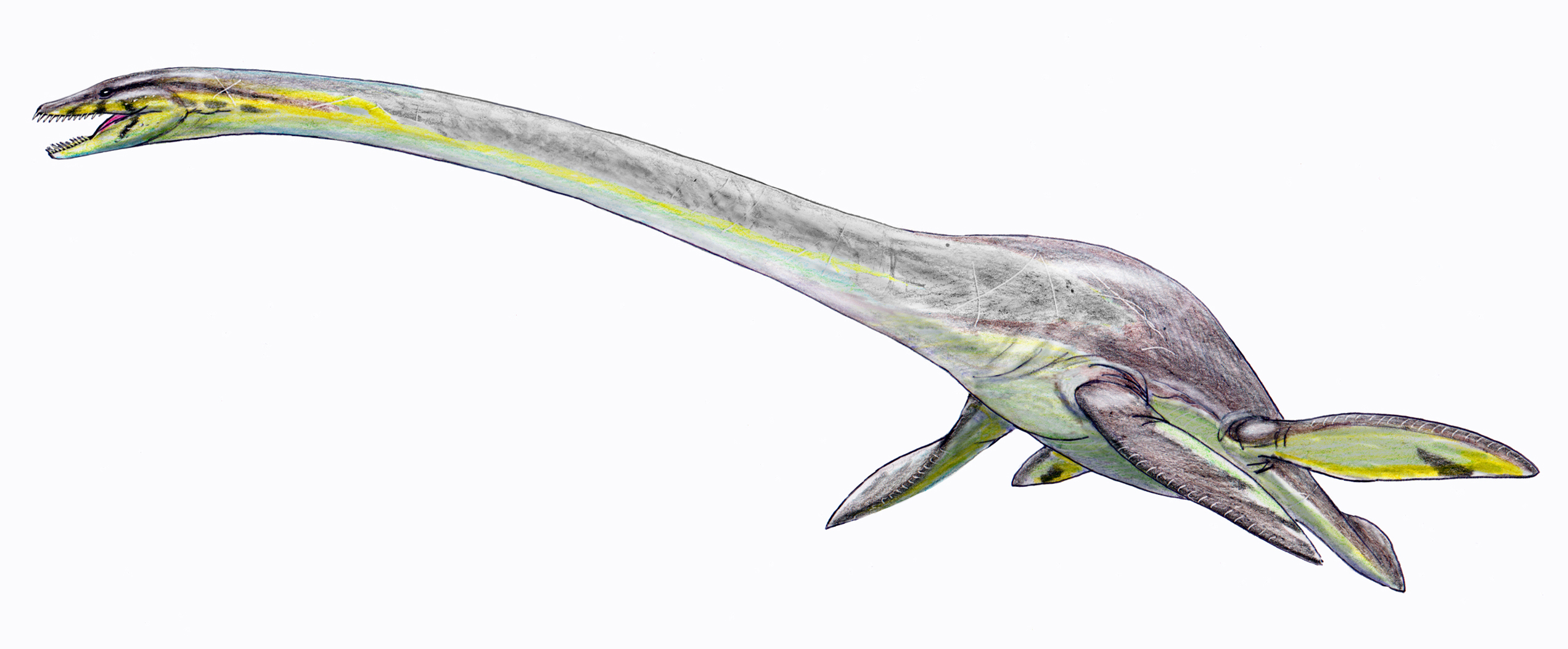
Modern life restoration of Elasmosaurus

==== 1870 ====
March 8

- Cope's mentor Joseph Leidy gave a presentation reporting his recent discovery that Cope's reconstruction of Elasmosaurus positioned the skull at the end of the tail rather than the end of the neck.
- Leidy's discovery embarrassed Cope, who began spreading notice of an unspecified error in his Elasmosaurus description with an offer to replace it with a corrected version and its second volume.

November

- O. C. Marsh collected a better an additional specimen of Polycotylus in Kansas that was better preserved than the type described by Cope. The specimen is now catalogued as YPM 1125.

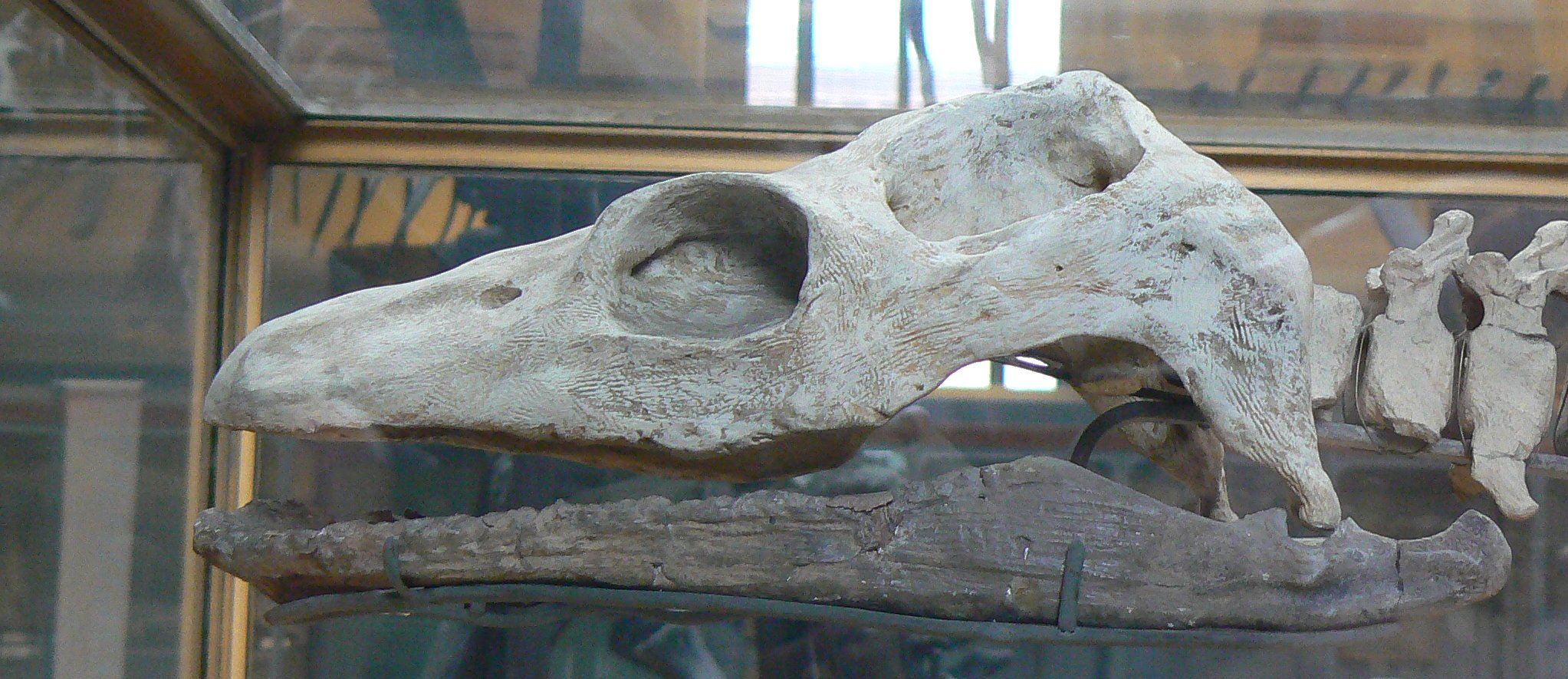
Skull of Cryptoclidus. C. eurymerus was originally described by Phillips in 1871.

==== 1871 ====
- Phillips described the species now known as Pliosaurus macromerus.
- Phillips described the species now known as Cryptoclidus eurymerus.
- Cope described the species now known as Hydralmosaurus serpentinus.
- Cope inaccurately referred to Polycotylus as "the first true plesiosauroid found in America."

==== 1872 ====
- Cope imagined elasmosaurs feeding by craning their necks above the water and striking downward at fish long distances from their bodies.
- B. F. Mudge discovered ten articulated vertebrae in the Fairport Chalk of Kansas that he mistook for ichthyosaur remains. These fossils are now catalogued as KUVP 1325.

==== 1873 ====
- Sauvage described the new species Liopleurodon ferox.
- Joseph Savage discovered a second, better preserved Trinacromerum "anonymum" in Kansas.

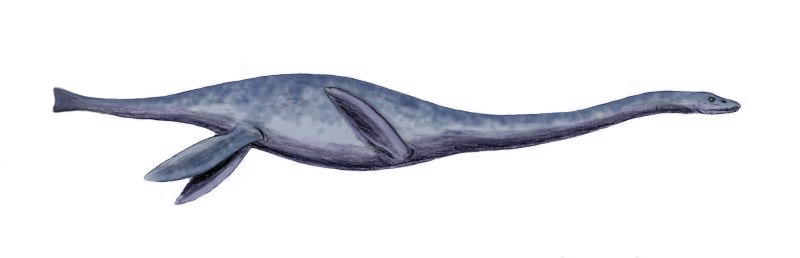
Life restoration of Mauisaurus haasti, described by Hector in 1874

==== 1874 ====
- Hector described the new species Mauisaurus haasti.
- Seeley described the new species Muraenosaurus leedsi.
- B. F. Mudge discovered fragments of a large elasmosaur skeleton in the Fort Hays Limestone of Kansas.
- Mudge and Williston excavated the remains another large Kansan plesiosaur, this one from the Smoky Hill Chalk. The specimen may be a Styxosaurus snowii and is currently catalogued as YPM 1644. It was the first plesiosaur Mudge had ever found with gastroliths and the first plesiosaur encountered by Williston in general.
- Hector reported the presence of elasmosaur remains in New Zealand.
- Seeley published a paper intended to help improve the state of science's understanding of plesiosaur shoulder girdle anatomy, which had been muddled by the poor preservation of the fossils many early paleontologists had to rely on for their observations.

==== 1875 ====
- Cope once more portrayed elasmosaurs as feeding by fishing from a distance with heads held above the waterline.

==== 1876 ====
- Blake in Tate and Blake described the new species Eretmosaurus dubius and Plesiosaurus longirostris.

==== 1877 ====
- Lydekker described the species now known as Simolestes indicus.
- Mudge discussed the gastroliths of YPM 1644 in a scientific publication. He concluded that plesiosaur exploited gastroliths to assist in breaking down food the way many modern birds and reptiles do.

==== 1879 ====
- Lydekker described the species now known as Cryptoclidus richardsoni.

=== 1880s ===
==== 1880 ====
- Oxford acquired the Misses Philpot collection, which included the type specimen of Plesiosaurus macromus. The museum catalogued this specimen as OXFUM J.28587.

==== 1881 ====
- Sollas described the species now known as Attenborosaurus conybeari.

==== 1882 ====
- The British Museum of Natural History purchased the Edgerton collection, which included the complete Plesiosaurus dolichodeirus jaw now known as BMNH R.255.

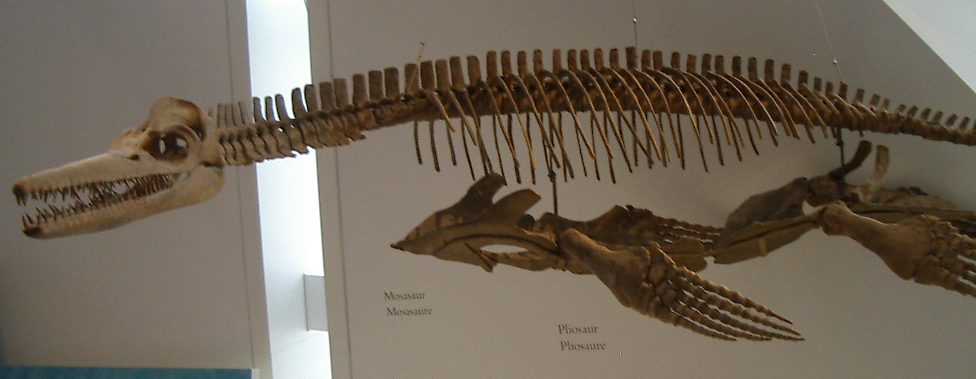
Skeletal mount of Trinacromerum bentonianum. T. bentonianum was described by Cragin in 1888.

==== 1884 ====
Spring

- The Smithsonian bought a partial plesiosaur skeleton from Charles Sternberg. The specimen is now catalogued as USNM 4989 and would later serve as the type specimen of the new genus and species Brachauchenius lucasi.

==== 1888 ====
- Harry Seeley mistakenly claimed to have discovered several fossil plesiosaur embryos.
- F. W. Cragin named the genus and species Trinacromerum bentonianum from Kansas.

=== 1890s ===
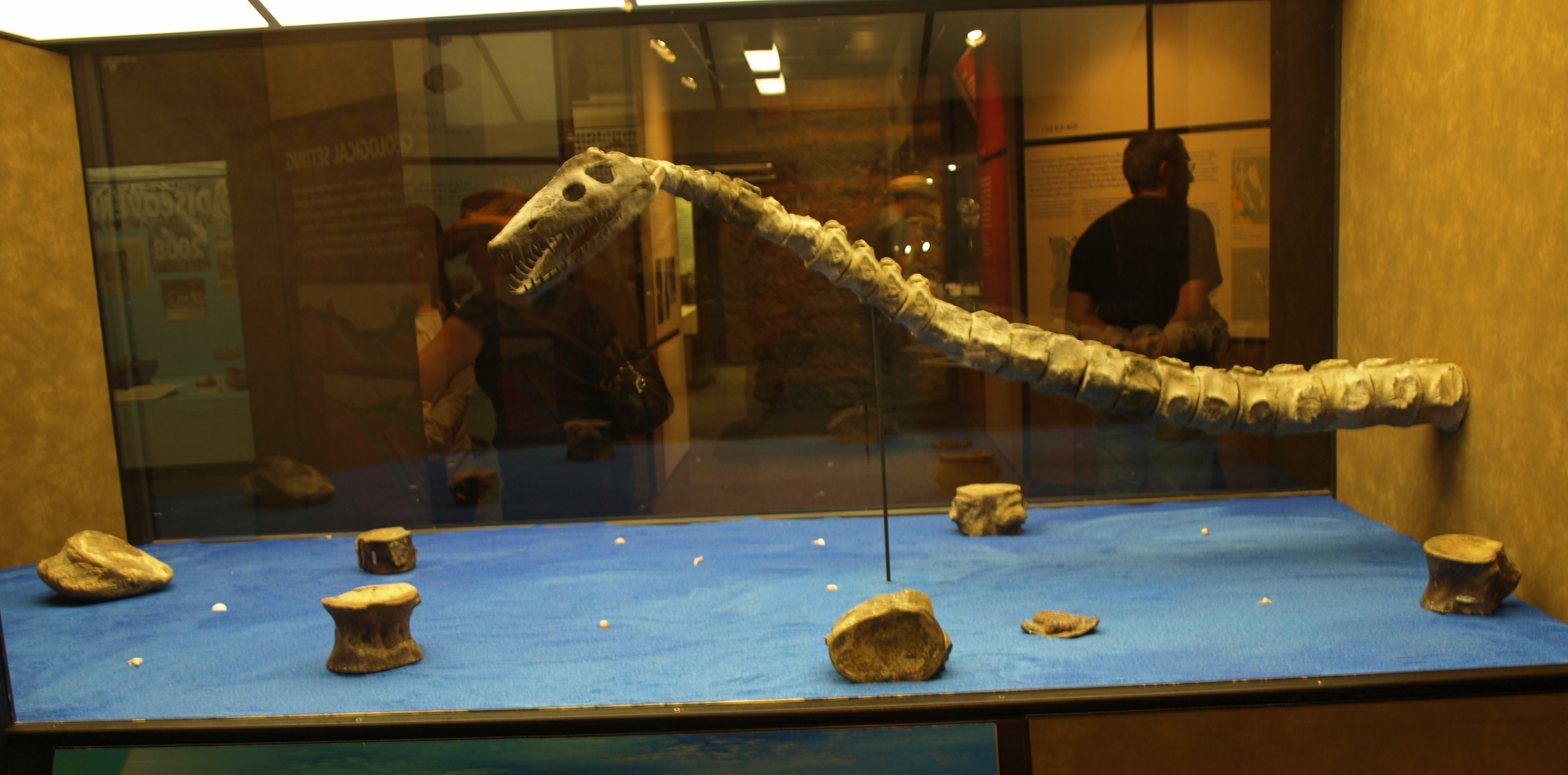
Skull and neck of Styxosaurus snowii. S. snowii was described by Williston in 1890.

==== 1890 ====
- In an article published in the New York Herald, Marsh brought up Cope's anatomic reversal of Elasmosaurus.
- E. P. West excavated a skull and partial neck belonging to the elasmosaur that would come to be named Styxosaurus snowii. The specimen is now catalogued as KUVP 1301.
- Williston described the species now known as Styxosaurus snowii.

==== 1892 ====
- Seeley described the species now known as Muraenosaurus beloclis.

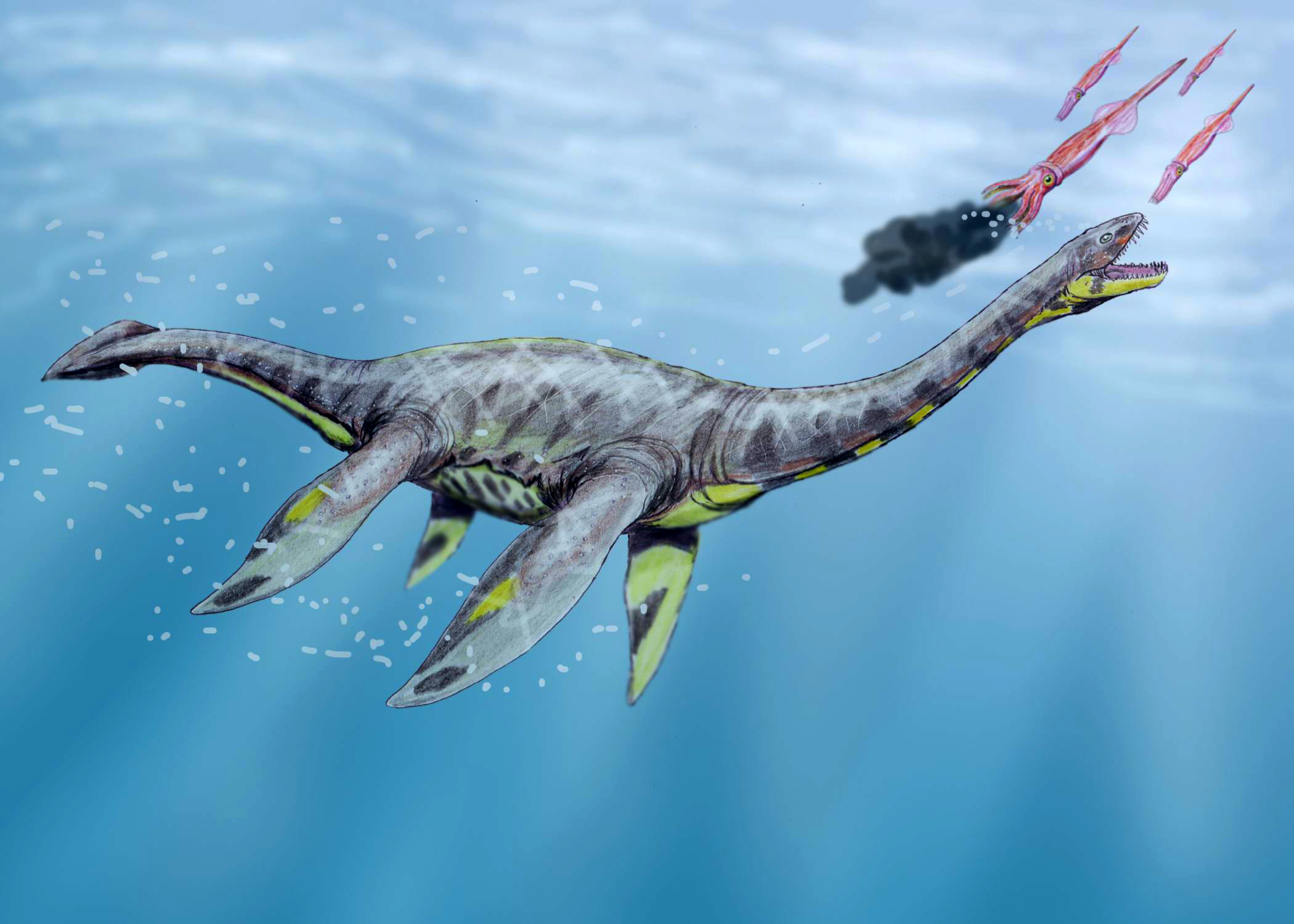
Life restoration of Seeleysaurus, described by Dames in 1895

==== 1893 ====
- Marsh described the new species Pantosaurus striatus.
- Charles H. Sternberg obtained two large elasmosaur vertebrae that would later serve as the type specimen of Elasmosaurus sternbergi. The specimen is now catalogued as KUVP 1312.
- F. W. Cragin discovered a partial plesiosaur skeleton and associated gastroliths in what is now recognized as the Kiowa Shale. This specimen is now catalogued as KUVP 1305 and would later be named Plesiosaurus mudgei.
- Williston argued that plesiosaurs ingested gastroliths only accidentally or to relieve "food craving[s]". However, he also observed that the rocks used as gastroliths were more similar to rocks 400–500 miles away in Iowa or the Black Hills of South Dakota than those of the local geology.

==== 1894 ====
- Cragin described the new species Plesiosaurus mudgei for KUVP 1305.

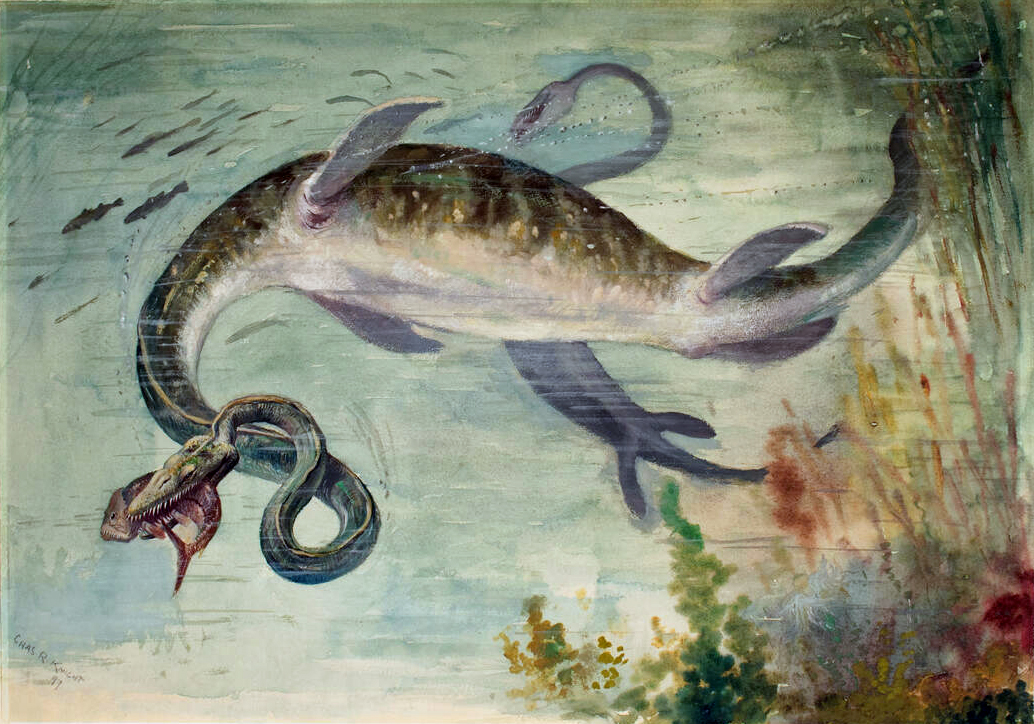
1897 life restoration of Elasmosaurus by Charles R. Knight

==== 1895 ====
- Dames described the species now known as Seeleysaurus guilelmiimperatoris.

==== 1897 ====
- With guidance from Edward Drinker Cope, paleo-artist Charles R. Knight illustrated an Elasmosaurus platyurus eating a fish. The elasmosaur's neck was erroneously looped into an anatomically impossible figure 8 configuration that evoked the image of "a python grasping at its prey".

==== 1898 ====
- Knight described the new species Megalneusaurus rex.

==== 1899 ====
- A man named Andrew Crombie discovered a fossil jaw fragment with six teeth in Queensland, Australia. The specimen would become the type for the genus Kronosaurus.

== 20th century ==
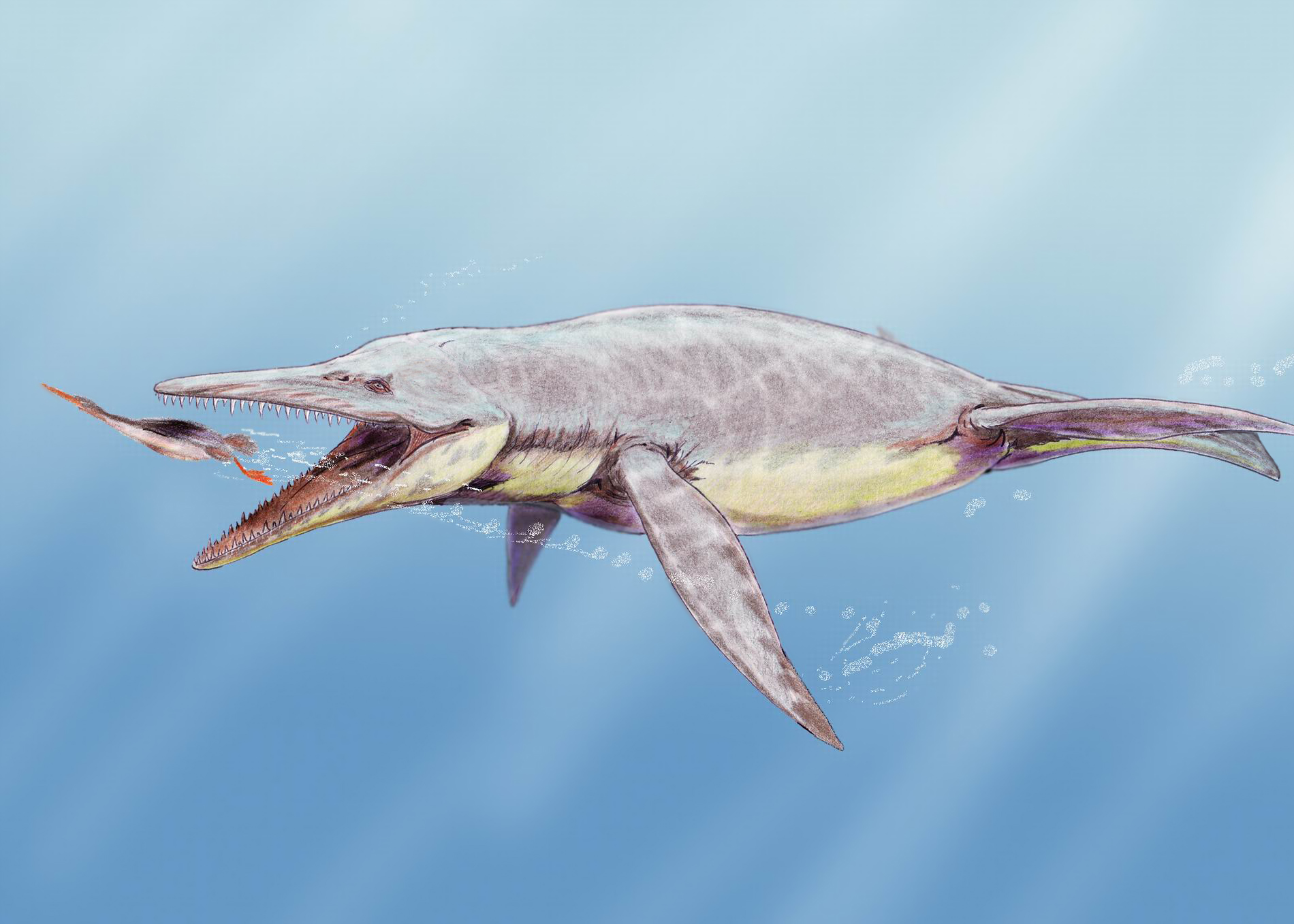
Brachauchenius lucasi

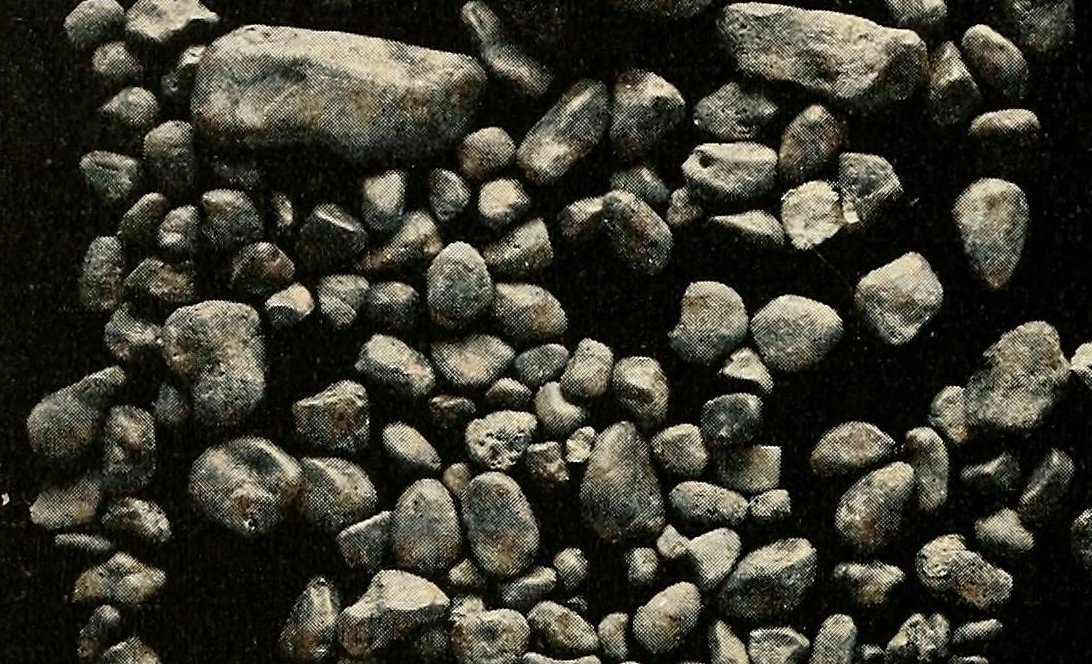
Plesiosaur gastroliths

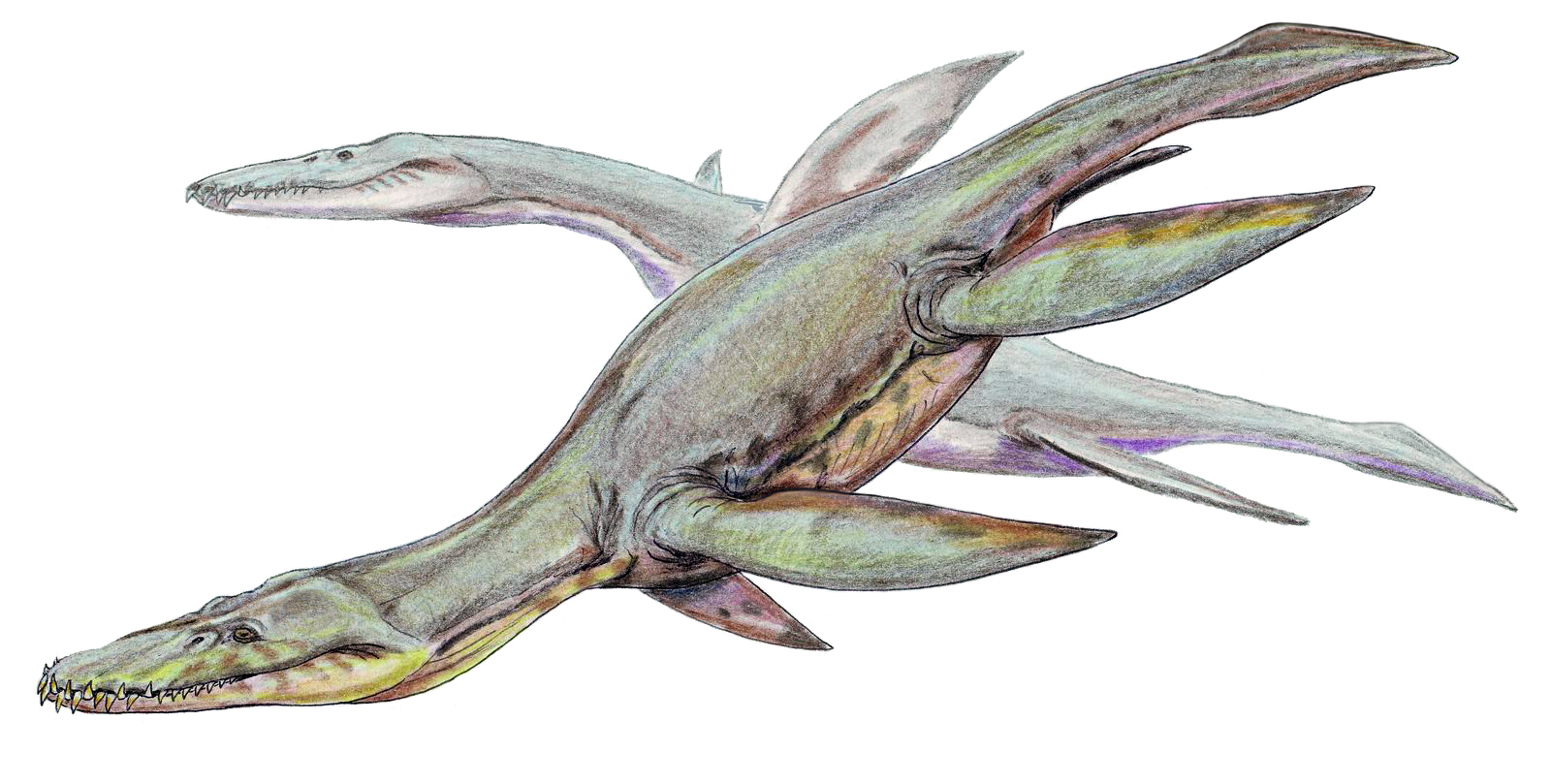
Simolestes

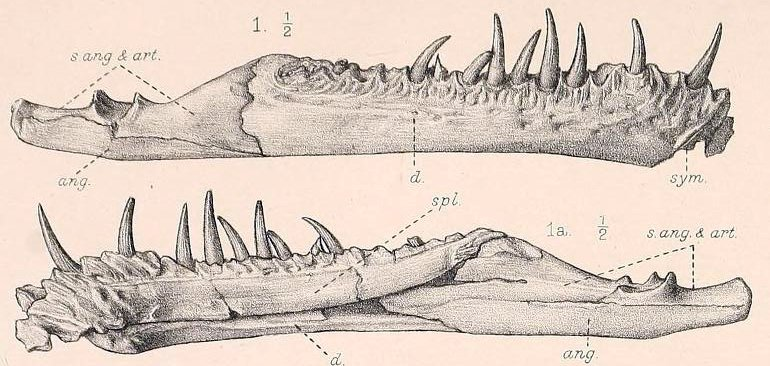
Jaws of Tricleidus

=== 1900s ===
==== 1900 ====
- Knight described the species now known as Tatenectes laramiensis.
- George F. Sternberg discovered the plesiosaur specimen now known as KUVP 1300 that would later serve as the type specimen of Dolichorhynchops osborni.

==== 1902 ====
- Williston described the new species Dolichorhynchops osborni.

==== 1903 ====
- Williston made several changes to plesiosaur taxonomy. One of these was the description of the new genus and species Brachauchenius lucasi, whose type specimen was a partial skeleton discovered in Kansas. This specimen is now catalogued as USNM 4989. He also described the new species Trinacromerum anonymum based on the vertebral series discovered by Mudge in 1872. This specimen is now known as KUVP 1325. Lastly, Williston regarded Plesiosaurus mudgei as a junior synonym of the species Plesiosaurus gouldii. He also commented on the ongoing debate regarding plesiosaur gastroliths, acknowledging the possibility that they were used for ballast while also maintaining openness to his 1893 suggestion that the stones were ingested accidentally.

==== 1904 ====
- Barnum Brown hypothesized that plesiosaurs used their gastroliths in a gizzard-like organ to grind up their invertebrate prey since they had no grinding or crushing teeth to do that job for them.
- Harvard paleontologist Charles R. Eastman, "offended" by Brown's claim that plesiosaurs had a gizzard, criticized the idea in print.
- Williston responded to Eastman, reasserting the evidence for plesiosaur gastroliths by noting that by this time at least 30 specimens containing them had been found.

==== 1906 ====
- Williston described several new taxa and specimens. One of these was the new species Elasmosaurus nobilis. Williston also described the new Elasmosaurus species E. sternbergi based on the vertebrae discovered by Charles H. Sternberg in 1893. He remarked that these fossils were the largest elasmosaur vertebrae that he had ever seen. Lastly, Williston described Marsh's Polycotylus, YPM 1125.

==== 1907 ====
- Williston reported the discovery of another Brachauchenius specimen, although this one was discovered in Texas.
- Williston argued that Brachauchenius lucasi was closely related to Liopleurodon ferox.

==== 1909 ====
- Andrews described the new species Simolestes vorax. and Tricleidus seeleyi.
- Watson described the new species Sthenarasaurus dawkins.

=== 1910s ===
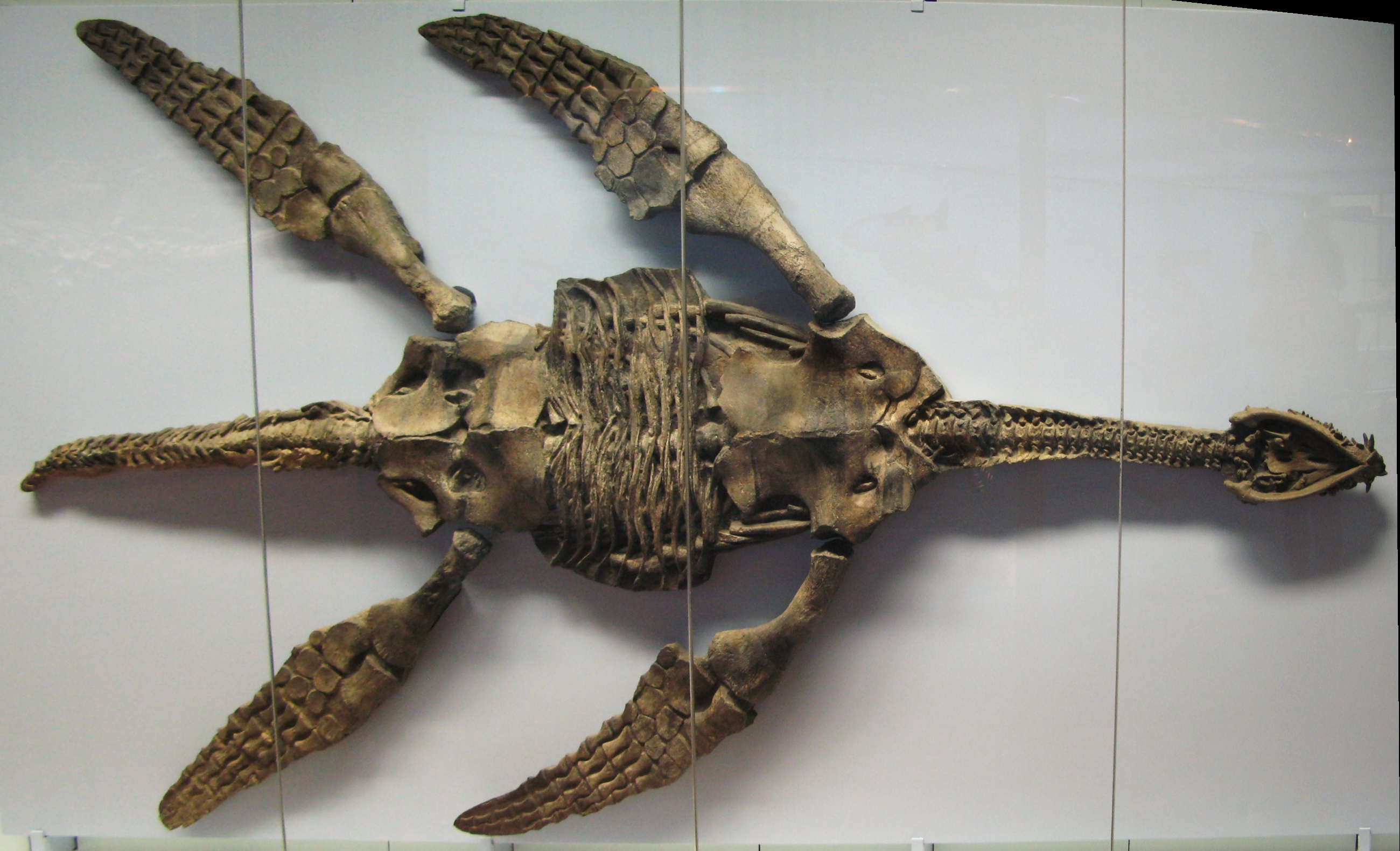
Skeleton of Rhomaleosaurus (now Meyerasaurus) victor

==== 1910 ====
- Fraas described the species now known as Rhomaleosaurus victor.

==== 1911 ====
- Andrews described the species now known as Leptocleidus capensis.

==== 1913 ====
- Brown described the new species Leurospondylus ultimus.

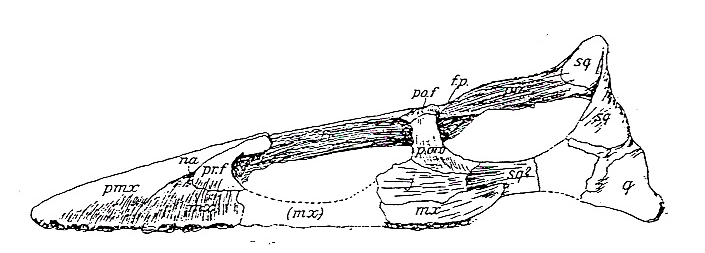
Skull of Brancasaurus

==== 1914 ====
- Williston criticized portrayals of long-necked plesiosaurs as having unnaturally flexible necks.
- Wegner described the new species Brancasaurus brancai.
- Williston observed that the semicircular canals inside a plesiosaur's ear were well developed, giving them a good sense of balance and coordination.

==== 1919 ====
- The Smithsonian obtained the Tylosaurus specimen with preserved polycotylid stomach contents from Charles Sternberg. The Tylosaurus is catalogued as USNM 8898 and its last supper as USNM 9468.

=== 1920s ===
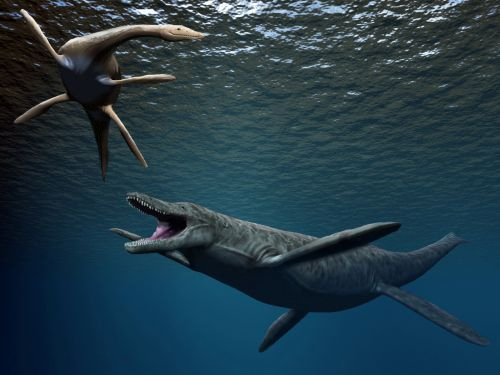
Kronosaurus

==== 1922 ====
- Andrews described the new species Leptocleidus superstes.
- Sternberg observed that being contained in the stomach of a mosasaur might have helped ensure the preservation of the polycotylid now known as USNM 9468 by protecting it from scavenging sharks.

==== 1923 ====
- Huene described the species now known as Hydrorion brachypterygius.

==== 1924 ====
- Heber Longman described Kronosaurus queenslandicus based on the jaw fragment found there by Andrew Crombie in 1899.

==== 1926 ====
- George F. Sternberg discovered a third specimen of Dolichorhynchops osborni in Kansas.

==== 1929 ====
- More Kronosaurus fossils were discovered in central Queensland near the site of the type specimen's discovery.

=== 1930s ===
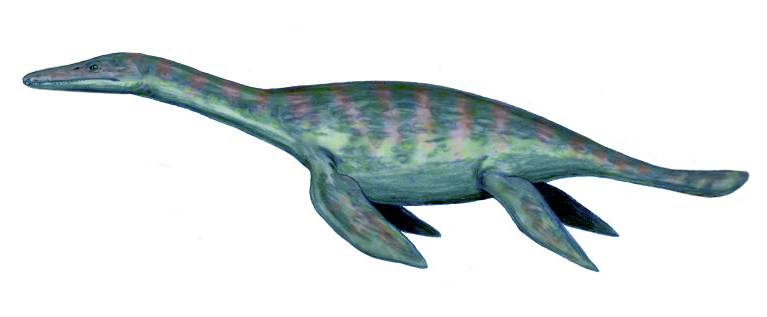
Life restoration of Macroplata

==== 1930 ====
- Swinton described the new species Macroplata tenuiceps.

==== 1931 ====
- George F. Sternberg and M. V. Walker discovered a well-preserved large elasmosaur specimen.

==== 1931-1932 ====
- Harvard University dispatched a fossil hunting expedition to Queensland, Australia. In Army Downs they discovered a nearly complete specimen of Kronosaurus.

==== 1934 ====
- The "surgeon's photograph" of the Loch Ness monster was hoaxed, cementing the association between plesiosaurs and the mythical beast.

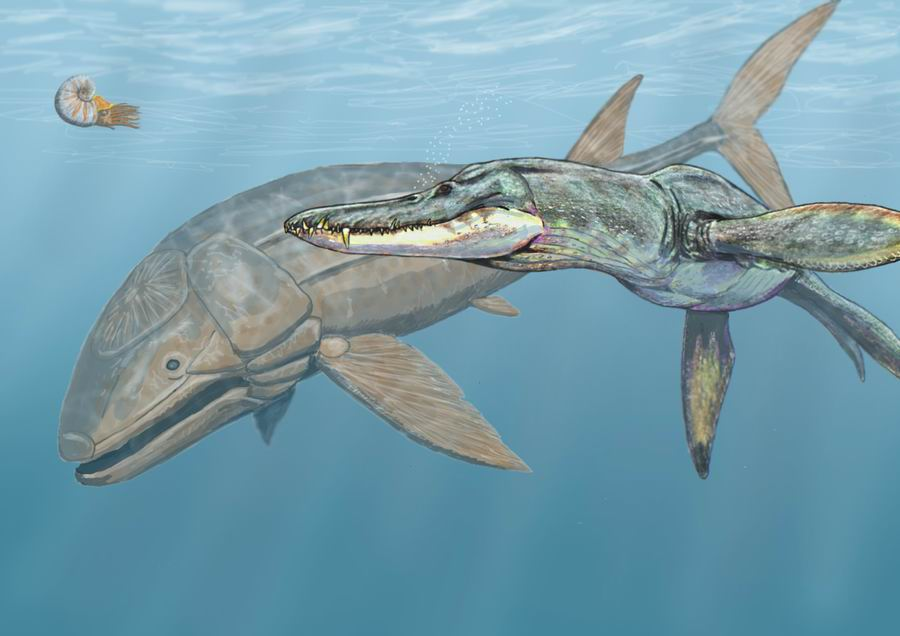
Pliosaurus rossicus (right) harassing Leedsichthys problematicus

==== 1935 ====
- The University of Nebraska State Museum bought the elasmosaur specimen discovered by Sternberg and Walker in 1931. The specimen is now catalogued as UNSM 1195.
- Russell described the new species Trinacromerum kirki.

==== 1936 ====
- A specimen of Trinacromerum was discovered in a roadside exposure of the Greenhorn Formation in Kansas. The specimen is now catalogued as KUVP 5070.

==== 1938 ====
- A large pliosaur skeleton was found on the banks of Russia's Volga River. However, the specimen was damaged during the excavation and only the skull and chest region were successfully extracted.

=== 1940s ===
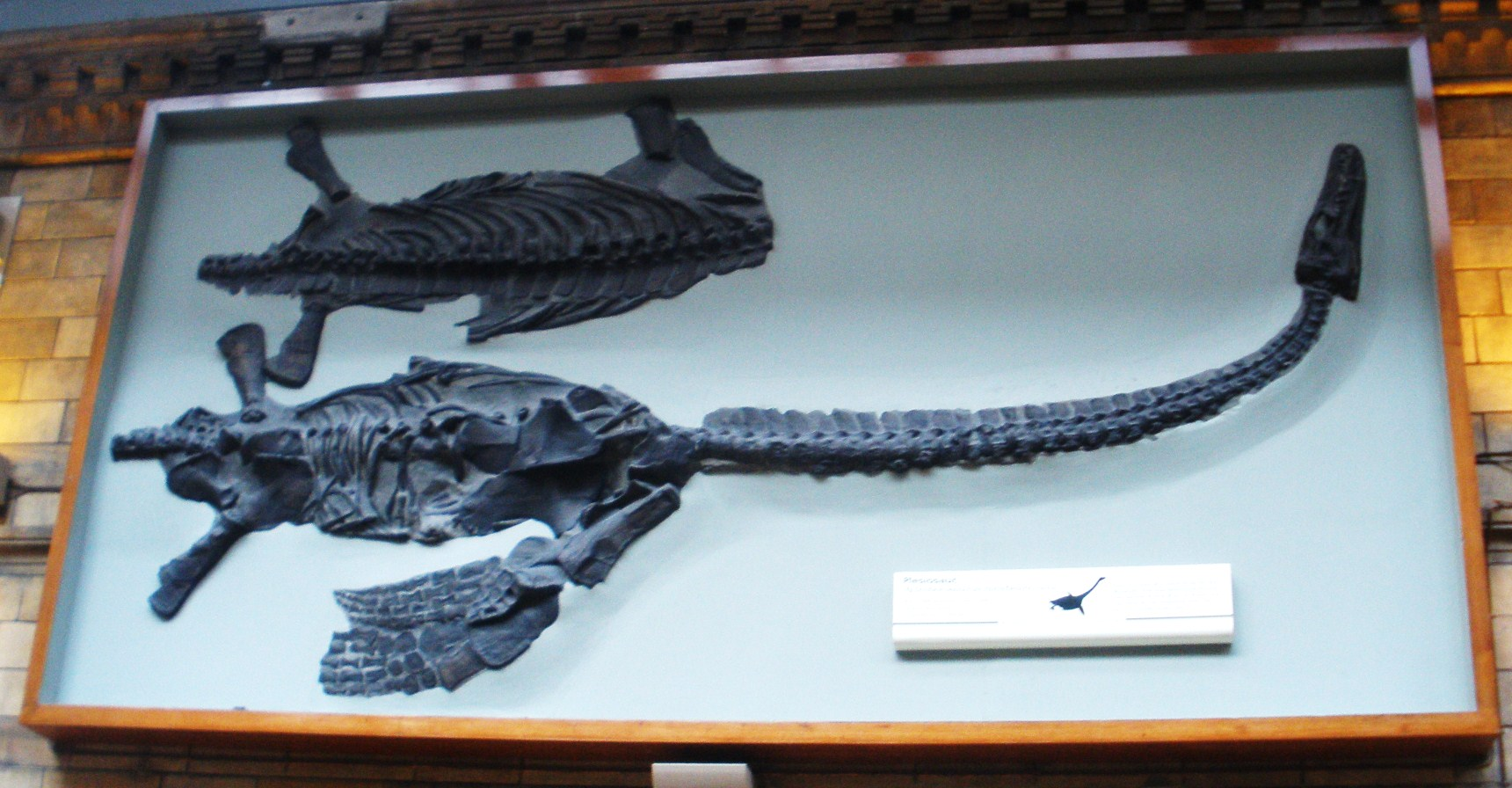
Cast of the "Plesiosaurus" now Attenborosaurus conybearei type specimen that was destroyed by Nazi bombers

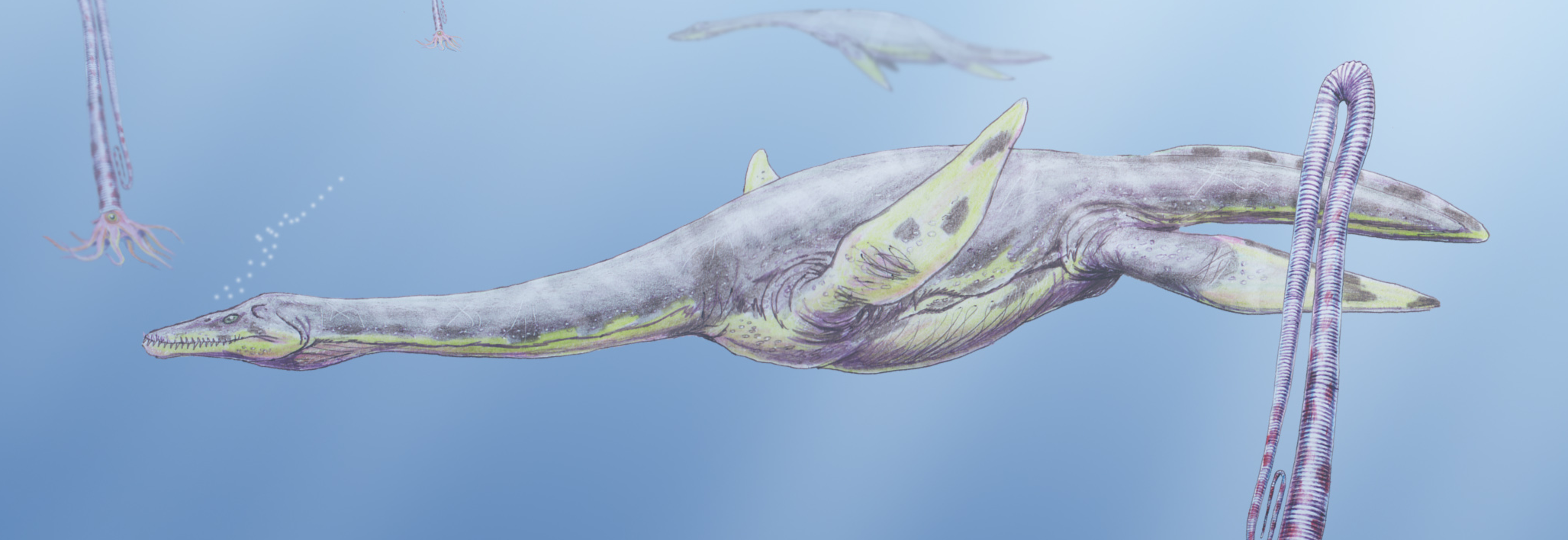
Life restoration of Aristonectes

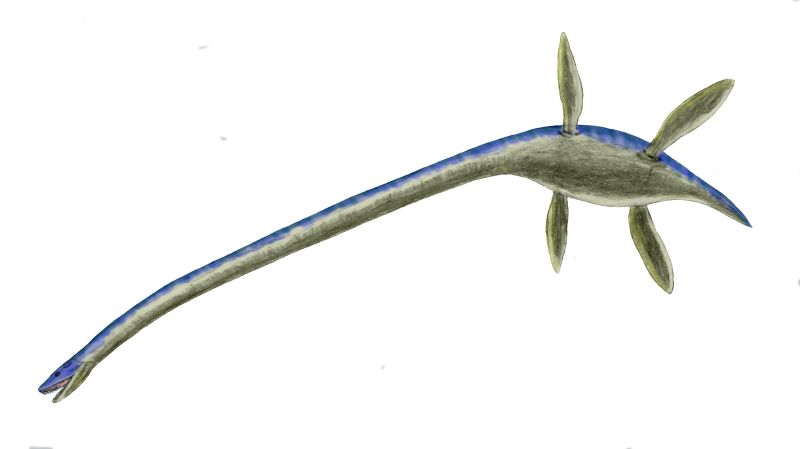
Life restoration of Thalassomedon

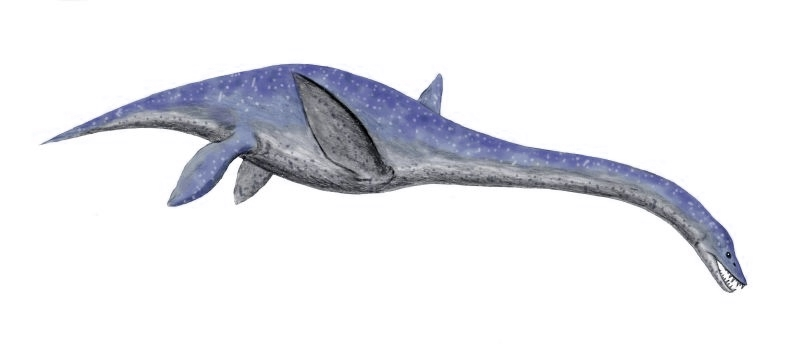
Life restoration of Libonectes morgani

==== 1940 ====
- A complete specimen of Plesiosaurus conybeari, including preserved soft tissues, was destroyed in a bombing raid against Bristol. Fortunately, a cast of the specimen survived in the British Museum.
- White described the new species Seeleyosaurus holzmadensis.

==== 1941 ====
- Cabrera described the new species Aristonectes parvidens.

==== 1942 ====
- Young described the new species Sinopliosaurus weiyuanensis.

==== 1943 ====
- Welles described the new species Aphrosaurus furlongi, Morenosaurus stocki, Thalassomedon haningtoni, Fresnosaurus drescheri, and Hydrotherosaurus alexandrae.
- Welles argued that plesiosaurs did have flexible necks after all.

==== 1944 ====
- Elmer S. Riggs named a new species of Trinacromerum, T. willistoni. The type specimen had been found by a construction crew working on US Highway 81, who donated it to the University of Kansas Museum of Paleontology.
- Riggs described the new species Trinacromerum willistoni based on the 1936 discovery KUVP 5070.

==== 1948 ====
- Soviet paleontologist Nestor Novozhilov described the Volga pliosaur as a new species, Pliosaurus rossicus.
- Novozhilov described the species now known as Pliosaurus irgisensis.

==== 1949 ====
- Welles described the species now known as Libonectes morgani.
- de la Torre and Rojas described the species now known as Vinialesaurus caroli.

=== 1950s ===
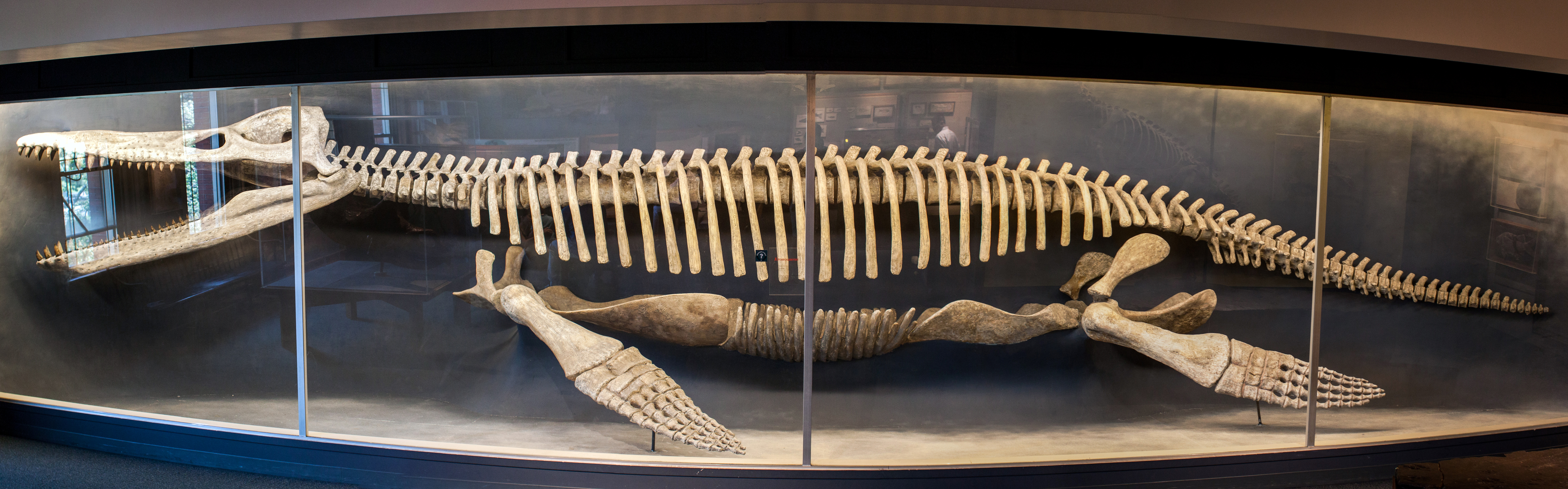
Kronosaurus mount at Harvard

- Alfred Sherwood Romer helped mount the Kronosaurus discovered in Queensland by the 1930s Harvard expedition for the University's Museum of Comparative Zoology. The poorly preserved bones required a significant amount of plaster for the restoration, earning the specimen the mocking nickname "Plasterosaurus". The final mount was 42 feet long, probably due to Romer overestimating the number of vertebrae in its spine; a more likely length is about 35 feet.

==== 1950 ====
- Fossil hunters Robert and Frank Jennrich serendipitously discovered a partial Brachauchenius skeleton when looking for sharks teeth.
- Shuler, like Williston in 1914, found elasmosaurs to have relatively inflexible necks. He also found elasmosaurs to have stereoscopic vision, which would have been useful for hunting small prey.

October

- George Sternberg excavated the Brachauchenius discovered by the Jennriches. This specimen, now known as FHSM VP-321, was both larger and better preserved than the Brachauchenius type specimen. Although it was put on display soon after discovery, it would not be described for the scientific literature for nearly 50 years.

==== 1952 ====
- Welles argued that the "Elasmosaurus sternbergi" type specimen was actually pliosaur vertebrae.

==== 1954 ====
- A private landowner in Kansas donated some Elasmosaurus vertebrae to the Sternberg Museum. These fossils are now catalogued as FHSM VP-398.

=== 1960s ===
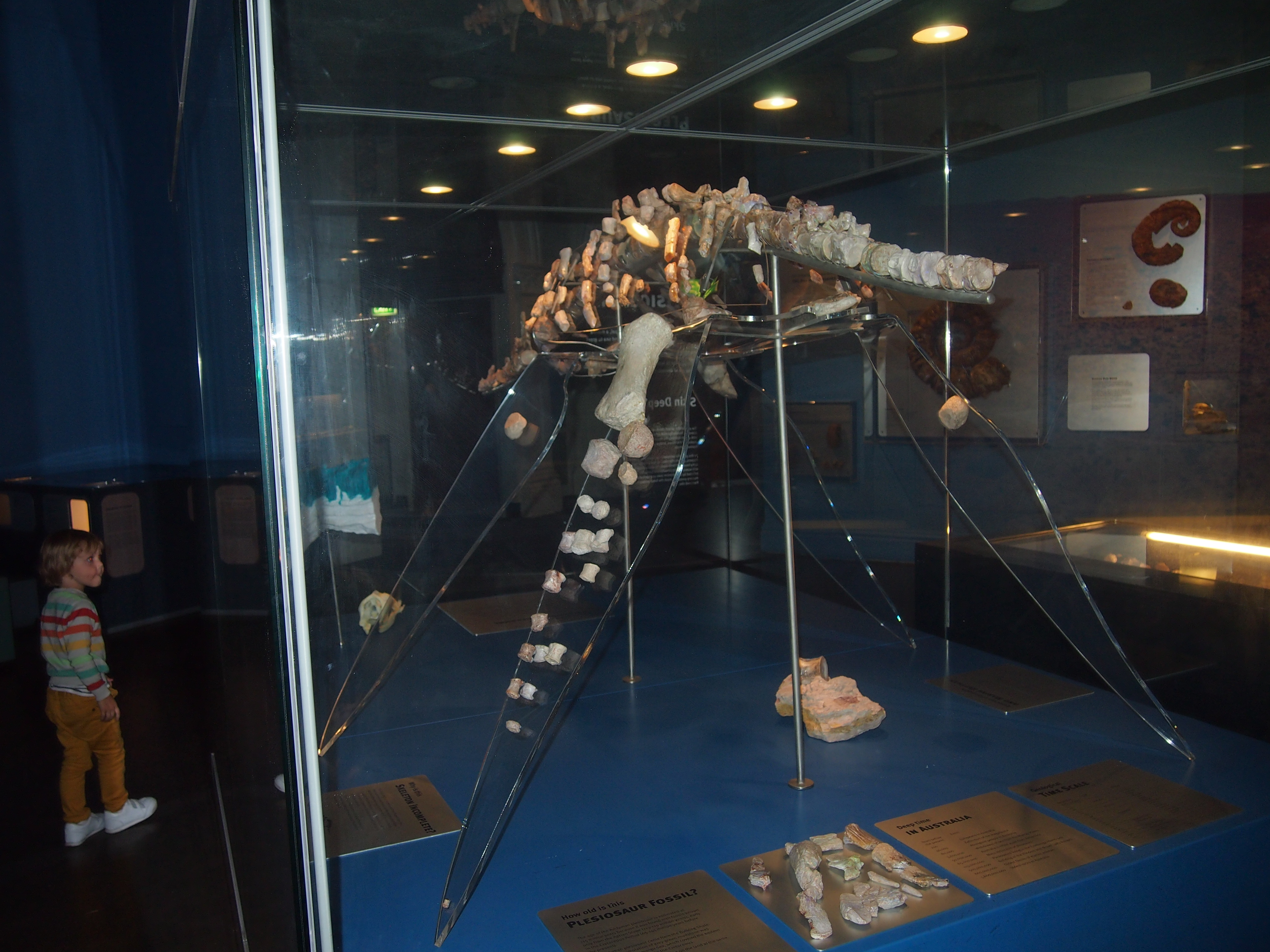
The Addyman plesiosaur

==== 1960 ====
- Tarlo described the new species Pliosaurus andrewsi.

==== 1962 ====
- Welles described the species now known as Callawayasaurus colombiensis.
- Welles reported the presence of elasmosaur remains in South America.
- Chatterjee and Zinsmeister reported the presence of elasmosaur remains in Antarctica.

==== 1967 ====
- Barney H. Newman and Lambert Beverly Halstead Tarlo argued that long-necked plesiosaur flippers could only move horizontally, and while maneuverable, they were confined to surface waters by an inability to dive.
- South Australian opal miners John and Molly Addyman discovered a plesiosaur whose remains had been converted to opal.

=== 1970s ===
==== 1971 ====
- Beverly Halstead reclassified the Volga pliosaur, Pliosaurus rossicus, to the genus Liopleurodon.
- Paul Johnston discovered plesiosaur fossils in a roadside exposure of the Greenhorn Formation in Kansas. During the excavation the dig site was scouted by two suspicious men. After a break from digging the Johnston team returned to find all of the fossils crudely extracted from the rock except for a flipper that the team had reburied. Based on the flipper, the stolen plesiosaur could be identified as Trinacromerum bentonianum.

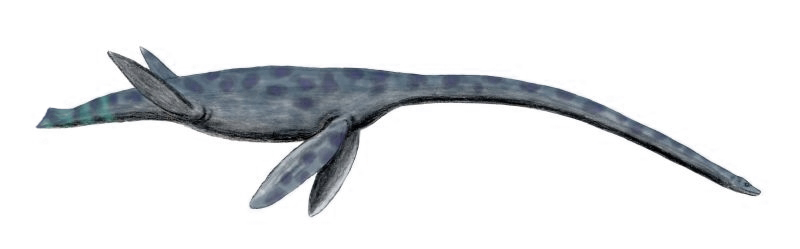
Styxosaurus in subaqueous "flight"

==== 1975 ====
- Jane Ann Robinson published a paper on plesiosaur locomotion concluding that they really did swim by "underwater flight" like sea turtles or penguins.

==== 1976 ====
- Ochev described the species now known as Georgiasaurus penzensis.

==== 1977 ====
- Robinson publishes follow up research to her previous publication on plesiosaur locomotion. This second paper notably concluded that plesiosaurs were incapable of leaving the water.

=== 1980s ===
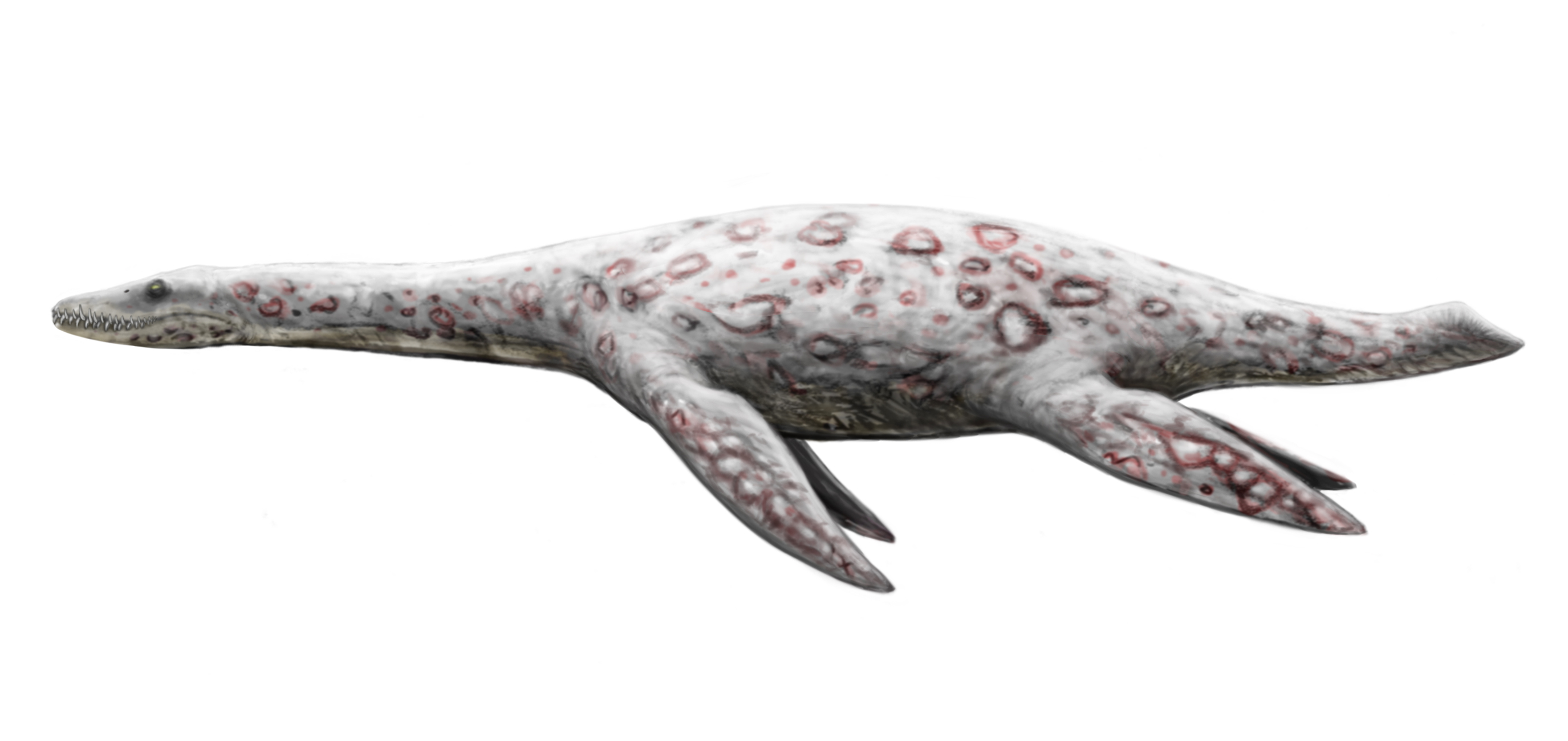
Life restoration of Bishanopliosaurus

==== 1980 ====
- Dong described the new species Bishanopliosaurus youngi.

==== 1981 ====
- Michael Alan Taylor published a paper concluding that plesiosaurs would have been capable of moving on land after all because their spinal column was too arched for their lungs to collapse.
- Brown described the new species Kimmerosaurus langhami.
- Brown emended the species Plesiosaurus guilelmiiperatoris originally described by Dames in 1895.
- Taylor argued that plesiosaurs used their gastroliths to adjust buoyancy or to help stay level and balanced while swimming.

==== 1982 ====
- Samuel F. Tarsitano and Jürgen Riess published a paper harshly critical of Robinson's previous work on plesiosaur locomotion. However, while criticizing Robinson's work they were reluctant to make any positive claims of their own, concluding that the details of plesiosaur locomotion were "unknown".
- Richard A. Thulborn published the results of his recent re-examination of the purported plesiosaur embryos discovered by Harry Govier Seeley. Thulborn concluded that Seeley's supposed embryos were actually nodules of mudstone and shale derived from sediments that once filled in a crustacean burrow system and were not even animal body fossils.
- Delair described the new species Bathyspondylus swindoniensis.

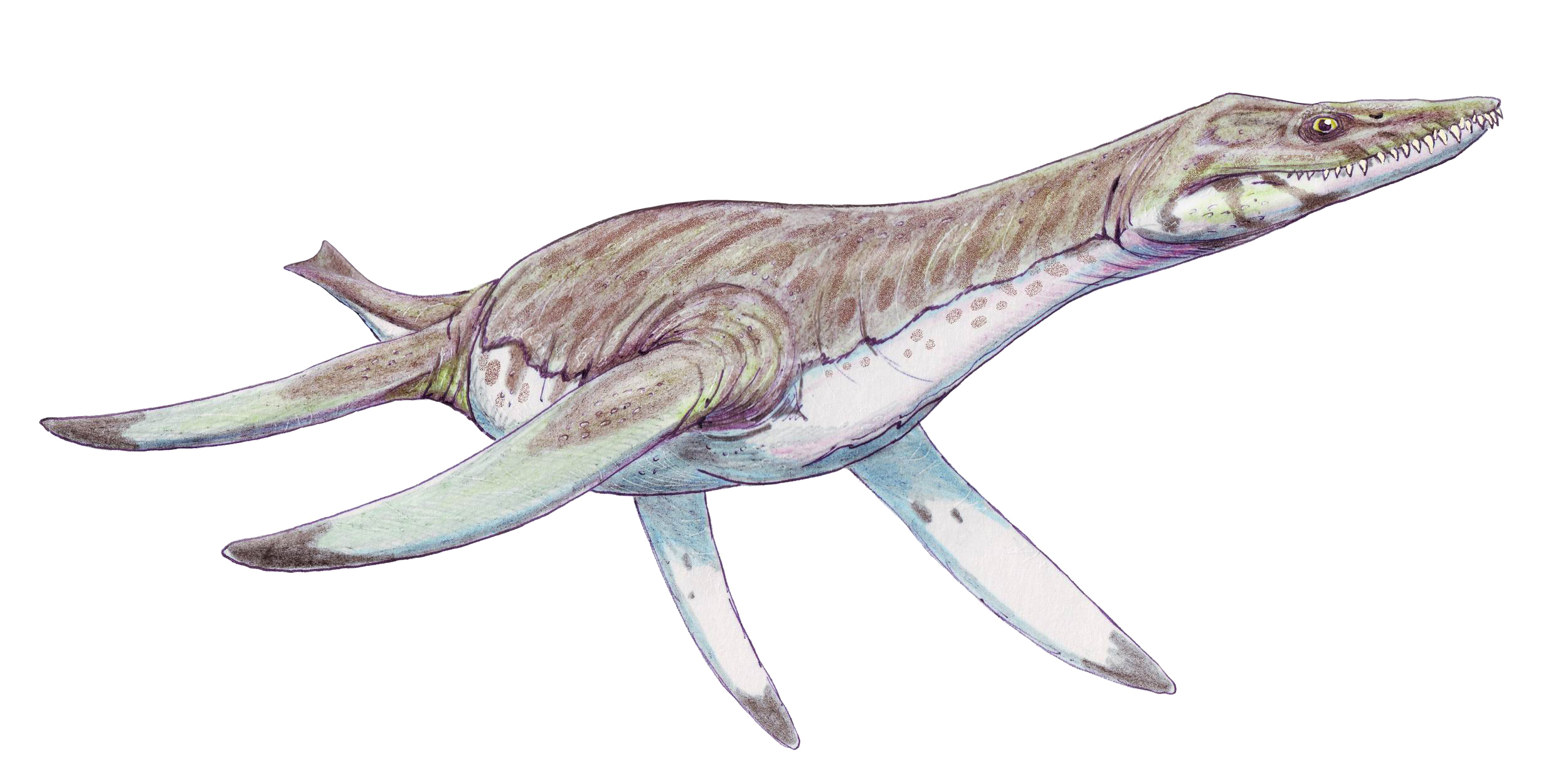
Leptocleidus

==== 1984 ====
- The partial remains of a large pliosaur, initially mistaken for a dinosaur, were discovered near Aramberri, Mexico.

==== 1985 ====
- Zhang described the new species Yuzhoupliosaurus chengjiangensis.

==== 1986 ====
- A South Australian opal miner named Joe Vida discovered the skeleton of a juvenile plesiosaur whose remains had converted to opal. Its preparator, Paul Willis nicknamed it Eric. An entrepreneur named Sid Londish bought the specimen and funded its preparation, but went bankrupt. When the specimen was put up for auction fear spread that a potential buyer might break the specimen down for its gemstone value. A television drive was arranged on behalf of the Australian Museum. The Museum succeeded in raising 340,000 dollars to buy the specimen, whose gemstone value was about $300,000. Eric was later identified as a specimen of Leptocleidus.

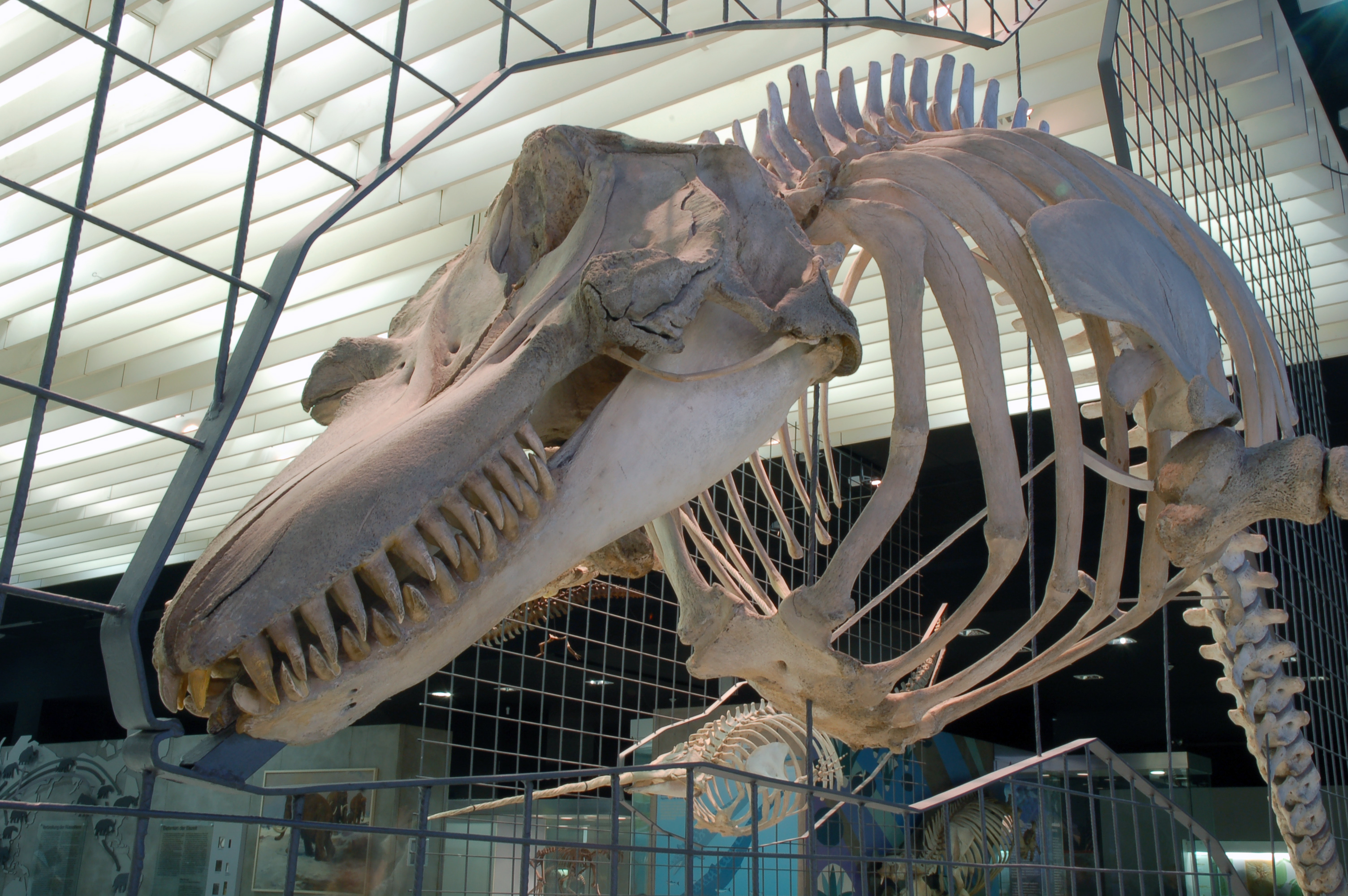
Liopleurodon teeth share traits with those of killer whales (skeleton pictured)

- Wiffen and Moisley described the new species Tuarangisaurus keysei.

==== 1987 ====
- Judith Massare published an analysis of plesiosaur feeding habits. She concluded that the long-necked plesiosauroids ate soft prey. Liopleurodon and its relatives, on the other hand, had teeth resembling those of killer whales and probably ate larger, bonier prey.
- Orville Bonner discovered a specimen of Dolichorhynchops osborni that was later seen to preserve developing young inside it.

==== 1988 ====
- Judy Massare analyzed Mesozoic marine reptile swimming abilities and found that long-necked plesiosaurs would have been significantly slower than pliosaurs due to excess drag incurred from the length of the neck.
- The Los Angeles County Museum of Natural History acquired the Dolichorhynchops osborni specimen discovered by Bonner and catalogued it as LACMNH 129639.

==== 1989 ====
- Beverly Halstead published a paper suggesting that plesiosaurs swam using all four flippers paired with an undulatory motion of the body comparable to a sea lion's.
- Nakaya reported the presence of elasmosaur remains in Japan.

=== 1990s ===
==== 1990 ====
- The world's smallest plesiosaur, between four and five feet in length, was discovered near Charmouth on the Dorset Coast.
- Sciau et al. described the species now known as Occitanosaurus tournemirensis.
- Gasparini and Spalleti described the new species Sulcusuchus erraini.
- Stewart noted a relative paucity of plesiosaur fossils from the lower portions of the Smoky Hill Chalk in a manuscript for the Society of Vertebrate Paleontology.
- Tim Tokaryk of the Royal Saskatchewan Museum discovers a new kind of plesiosaur, Dolichorhynchops herschelensis near Herschel, Saskatchewan.

May

- J. D. Stewart, accompanied by Everhart, discovered a nearly complete Dolichorhynchops rear flipper in the lower Smoky Hill Chalk. Unfortunately it was too late to correct the erroneous statements in his aforementioned paper regarding the supposed rarity of plesiosaurs in the lower Smoky Hill Chalk. The flipper is now catalogued as LACMNH 148920.

Location of Lawrence in the U.S. state of Kansas

October

- Stewart's paper, complete with his now-erroneous statements, was published in the Niobrara Chalk Excursion Guidebook in honor of the society's 50th anniversary meeting in Lawrence that year.

==== 1991 ====
- Ralph E. Molnar published suspicion that the "Kronosaurus queenslandicus" specimen discovered by the Harvard expedition might be a distinct species.
- Several Elasmosaurus vertebrae and gastroliths were found near the site where the type specimen of the genus itself was excavated.
- Cruikshank and others hypothesized that plesiosaurs could smell and taste water that "passively" flowed through their nasal passages while they swam.

==== 1992 ====
- Hampe described the new species Kronosaurus boyacensis.
- Everhart discovered some fragmentary plesiosaur fossils in the lower Smoky Hill Chalk of Kansas. Some of the fossils seemed to have been partially digested. The remains were later catalogued as FHSM VP-13966.
- Everhart showed the partially digested fossils to J. D. Stewart, who recognized them as pieces of a plesiosaur skull. The fossils are now catalogued as
- Everhart and his wife helped excavated a Styxosaurus snowii specimen in Kansas. During the dig Mrs. Everhart discovered an additional partial plesiosaur skeleton.

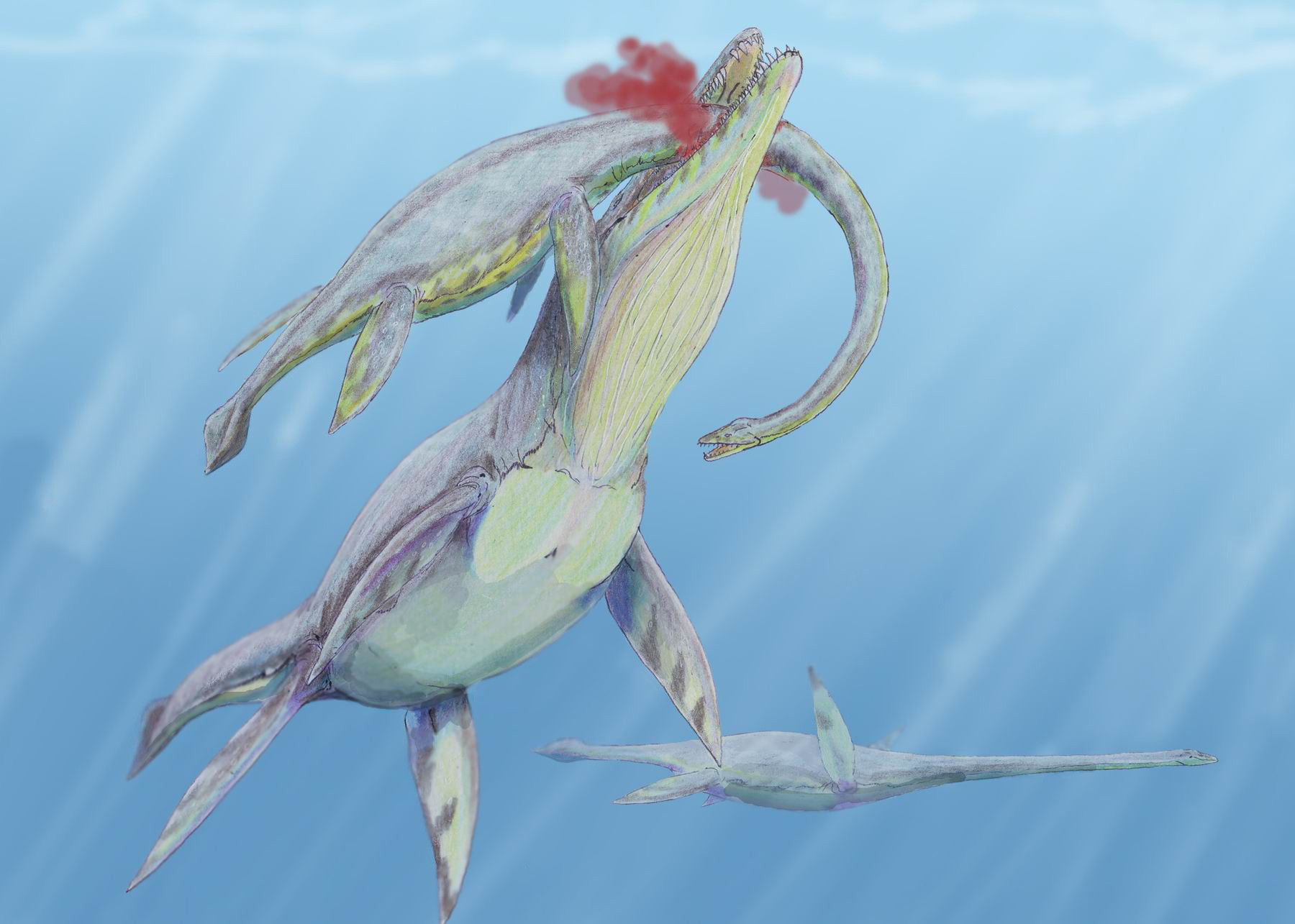
Woolungasaurus attacked by Kronosaurus

==== 1993 ====
- Robert T. Bakker nicknamed the long-necked plesiosaurs "swan lizards".
- Robert T. Bakker argued that plesiosaurs suffered several major extinction events throughout the Mesozoic, rather than continuously diversifying until the end-Cretaceous mass extinction.
- Robert T. Bakker argued that Dolichorhynchops and its relatives became the most common kind of short-necked plesiosaur in the Cretaceous Western Interior Seaway after the ichthyosaurs became extinct. Further, they convergently evolved many traits similar to those of ichthyosaurs, such as long snouts and large eyes.
- Tony Thulborn and Susan Turner examined the crushed skull of the long-necked plesiosaur Woolungasaurus and found the presence of tooth marks left by some giant predator. They hypothesized that a Kronosaurus was the culprit.
- Storrs, like Williston and Shuler before him, argued that long-necked plesiosaurs had relatively inflexible necks.
- Rothschild and Martin reported the presence of the remains of a fossilized fetus preserved in the abdomen of a Dolichorhynchops osborni.

==== 1994 ====
- Glenn W. Storrs formally described the world's smallest plesiosaur for the scientific literature.
- South Dakota School of Mines paleontologist James Martin excavated and described a very young pliosaur specimen. The specimen was in what would have been the middle of the Cretaceous Western Interior Seaway. It is more plausible to think that this young individual was born in the seaway itself rather than surviving the extremely long swim from shore. So, the specimen provided circumstantial evidence for live birth and possibly even parental care by pliosaurs in the Cretaceous Western Interior Seaway. However, since there were no adult fossils present this interpretation is speculative. Further, the fossil site had been heavily vandalized before discovery by scientists. A large hole was found near the baby pliosaur that could have once held the bones of its mother or other pod members.

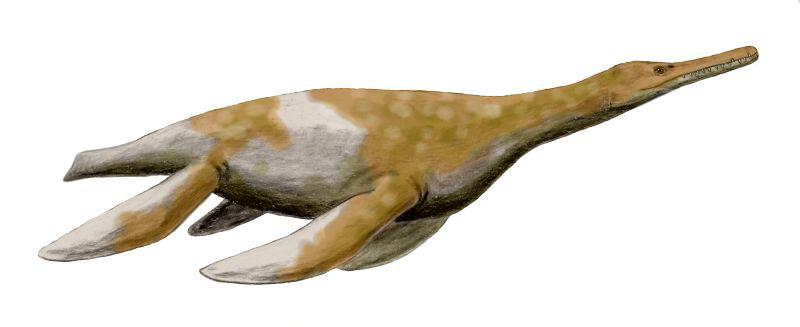
Trinacromerum bentonianum from the Late Cretaceous of Kansas

- An amateur fossil hunter named Simon Carpenter discovered a 7-foot-long Pliosaurus brachyspondylus skull in claypits of the Blue Circle cement works near Westbury, England. More of the skeleton was found in the vicinity and this specimen came to be regarded as the best preserved pliosaur ever found; it is held by Bristol Museum.
- A man named Alan Dawn discovered a previously unknown kind of pliosaur in the Middle Jurassic Oxford Clay of Cambridgeshire, England. Godefroit described the new species Simolestes keileni.
- Ken Carpenter recognized the plesiosaur specimen discovered by Pamela Everhart in 1992 as one of the largest known specimens of Dolichorhynchops osborni, now catalogued as CMC VP-7055.

==== 1996 ====
- Carpenter published a review of the Cretaceous short-necked plesiosaurs known from western North America. In this paper he both revised these plesiosaurs' taxonomy as well as offering observations on their biostratigraphy and evolution. Carpenter described the new genus and species Plesiopleurodon wellesi. He also argued against the prevailing trend to treat Dolichorhynchops Trinacromerum as taxonomic synonyms by observing that they could be distinguished based on their skull anatomy. However, he did conclude that the Trinacromerum species T. anonymum and T. willistoni were junior synonyms of T. bentonianum.

In his remarks on short-necked plesiosaur evolution, Carpenter argued that polycotylids were more closely related to long-necked plesiosaurs than pliosaurs. He observed that Trinacromerum bentonianum seems to have existed from the late Cenomanian to the Turonian. This represents a span of time approximating 3.3 million years. He found Dolichorhynchops osborni to have had an even longer lifespan, from the middle Turonian to the early Campanian., or roughly 4 million years. His research also suggested that there was a span of time during the life of the Western Interior Seaway in which it was not inhabited by polycotylids.

He also reported that the Dolichorhynchops specimen KUVP 40001 from the Pierre Shale of South Dakota may have achieved the extraordinary length of 23 feet. The large size of the Pierre Shale Dolichorhynchops compared to those of the earlier Smoky Hill Chalk suggested to Carpenter that these plesiosaurs were evolving larger body sizes over time. In fact the Pierre Shale specimens of Dolichorhynchops were nearly as large as Brachauchenius lucasi. Carpenter described a particularly large specimen of that latter taxon in this paper as well, specifically FHSM VP-321. His study of Brachauchenius led him to concur with Williston that it was closely related to Liopleurodon ferox.

- Arthur R. I. Cruickshank, David M. Martill, and Leslie Noe formally named the new Oxford Clay pliosaur Pachycostasaurus dawni. The researchers noticed that its bones were very dense. So dense, they speculated it would naturally sink in the water and spent most of its time feeding on soft bodied animals living near the seafloor.

Location of Hokkaido Prefecture in Japan

==== 1997 ====
- Cruickshank and Long described the new species Leptocleidus clemai.
- Gasparini described the new species Maresaurus coccai.
- Liggett and others reported the discovery of a giant plesiosaur flipper from the Greenhorn Limestone of Kansas. Although a significant portion of the specimen was missing, it implied a life length of more than 2 m. The researchers tentatively attributed the flipper to Brachauchenius lucasi. The specimen is now catalogued as FHSM VP-13997.
- Two fossilized skeletons of Dolichorhynchops herschelensis are discovered near Herschel, Saskatchewan at the Ancient Echoes Interpretive Centre- only the second and third specimens to have ever been found.

==== 1998 ====
- Tamaki Sato and Kazushige Tanabe reported that a partial long necked plesiosaur skeleton had been discovered on the banks of Hokkaido's Obirashibe River. Although they could not identify its exact species, the specimen was significant because its stomach contents provided clues to long-necked plesiosaur diets. This individual's gut preserved the beaks of thirty small ammonites.
- John A. Long bemoaned the fact that the putative "Kronosaurus queenslandicus" uncovered by a Harvard team during the early 1930s had still not been formally described for the scientific literature.
- Michael Everhart and Glenn Storrs excavated additional Elasmosaurus ribs, vertebrae and gastroliths at the site of the 1991 discovery.
- Long reported the presence of elasmosaur remains in Australia.

==== 1999 ====
- Carpenter published a summary of the elasmosaur fossils discovered in the Smoky Hill Chalk.
- Storrs published a revision of Elasmosaurus taxonomy. He reinterpreted the Elasmosaurus nobilis type specimen as indeterminate elasmosaurid remains. He also reinterpreted the "Elasmosaurus" sternbergi type specimen as two cervical and one dorsal vertebrae rather than two dorsal vertebrae as Williston had reported in his original description. However, Storrs did agree that it was an elasmosaur specimen rather than a pliosaur as argued by Welles in 1952.

== 21st century ==
=== 2000s ===
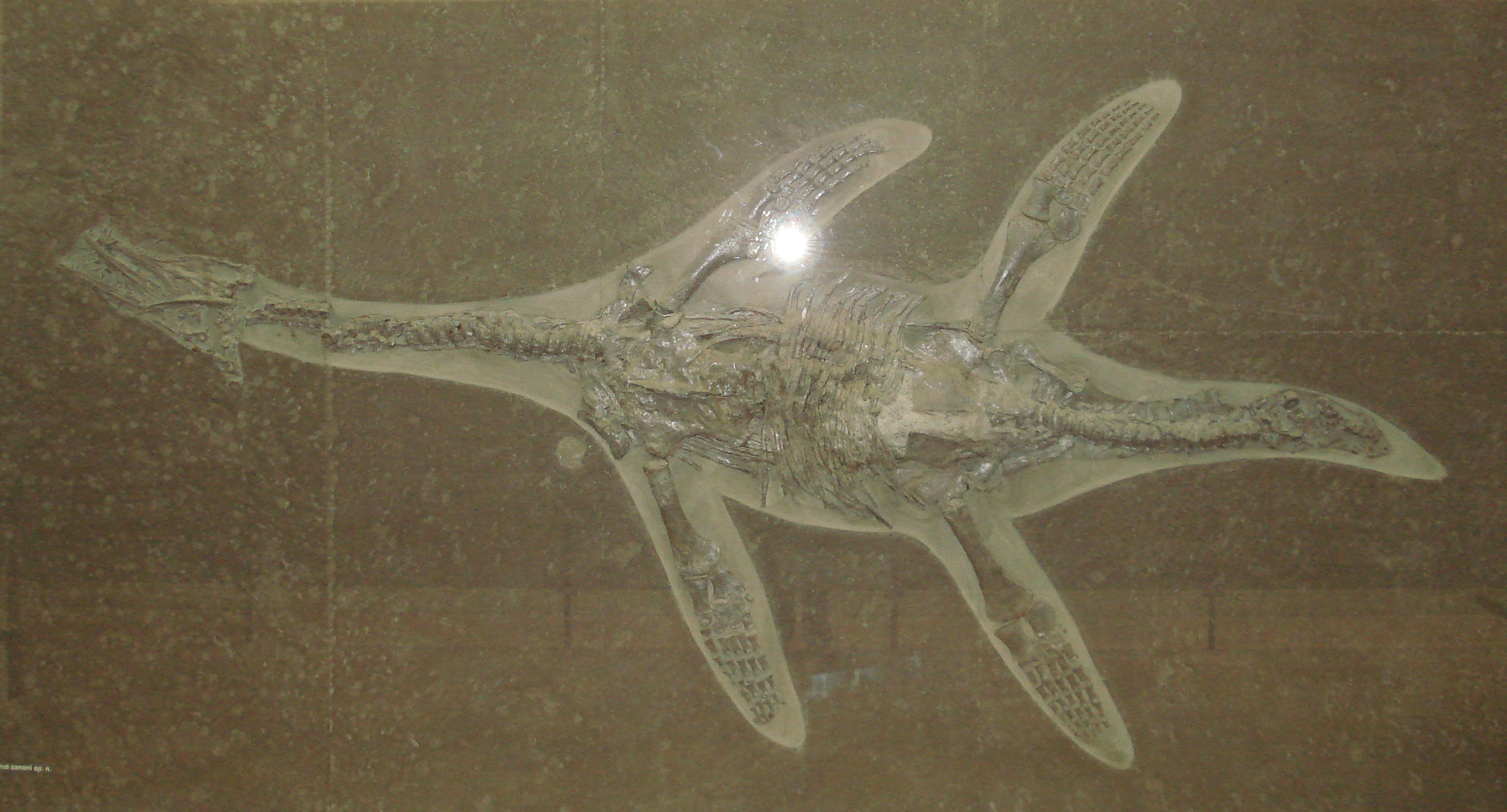
Life restoration of Leptocleidus capensis.

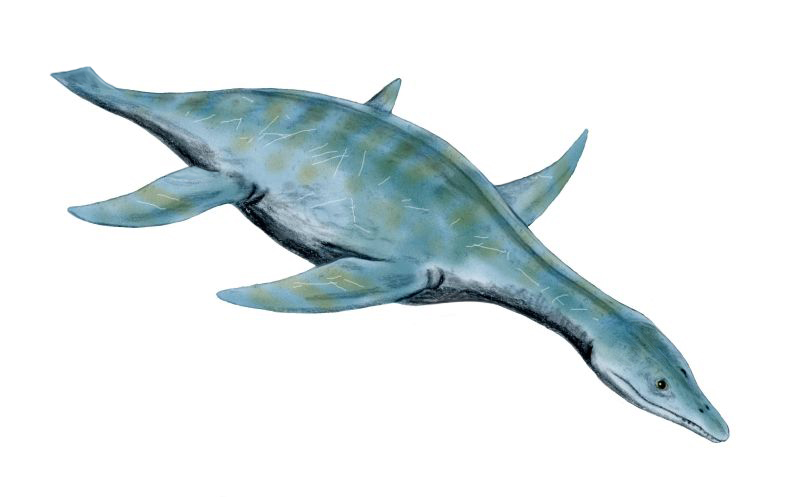
Life restoration of Leptocleidus capensis.

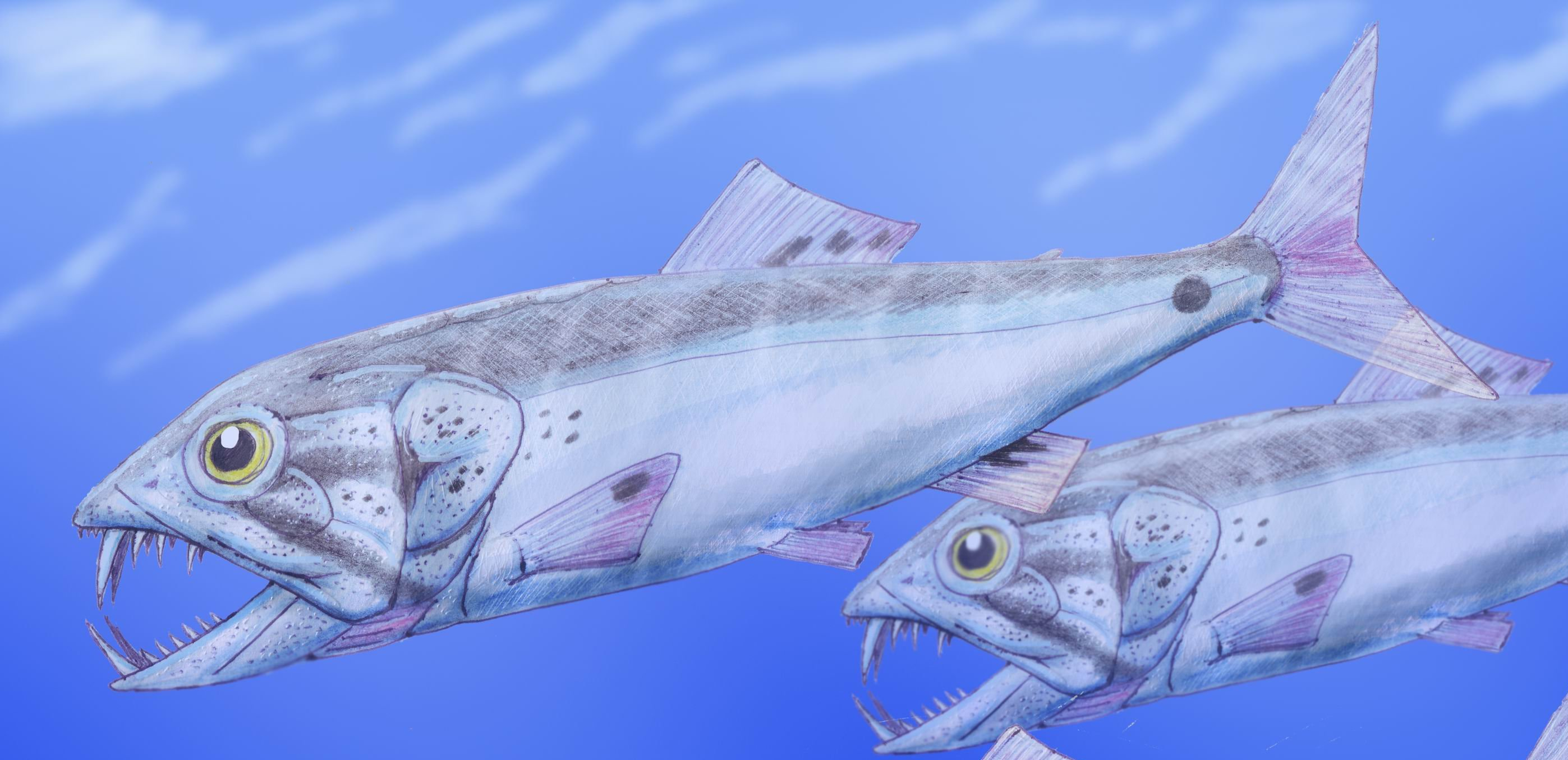
Life restoration of Enchodus.

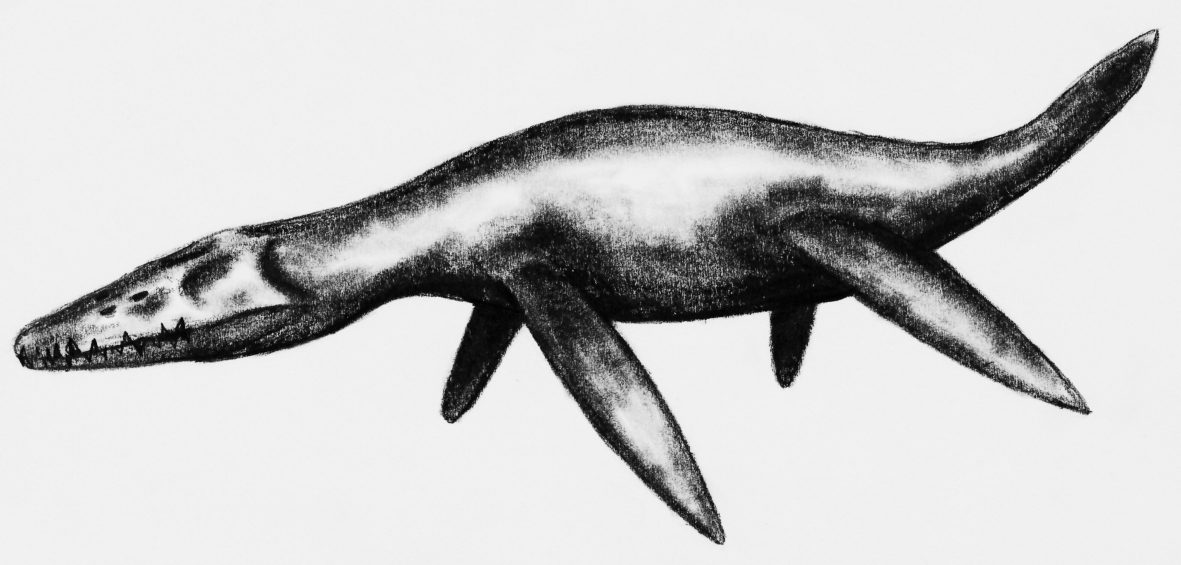
Speculative life restoration of the Aramberri pliosaur.

==== 2000 ====
- Theagarten Lingham-Soliar published further criticism of Robinson's interpretation of the biomechanics of plesiosaur locomotion.
- O'Keefe described the new species Hauffiosaurus zanoni.
- Michael Everhart re-examined UNSM 1195.
- Lingham-Soliar argued that plesiosaur hind-flippers weren't mobile or muscular enough to help propel them through the water.
- Everhart published a study of the gastroliths associated with the elasmosaur specimen KUVP 129744 from Kansas. The specimen was associated with roughly 13.1 kg of gastroliths. The largest of these was 17 cm long and 1.4 kg in weight. Everhart would later compare its size to that of a softball and observe that not only was it one of the largest known plesiosaur gastroliths, but also one of the largest gastroliths from any animal.

November

- The Advertiser, a newspaper based in Adelaide, Australia bought the Addyman opalized plesiosaur specimen for $25,000 and donated it to the South Australian Museum. A paleontologist at the museum named Ben Kear identified it as a member of the genus Leptocleidus. The two foot long specimen was the smallest specimen of the genus ever found and probably a baby.

==== 2001 ====
- David J. Cicimiurri and Michael J. Everhart published a study of the Styxosaurus snowii specimen NJSM 15435, which preserved both stomach contents and gastroliths. Among the stomach contents were remains of the bony fish Enchodus. By this point in time at least fifteen different plesiosaur specimens were known with preserved stomach contents. The researchers observed that the Enchodus remains preserved in NJSM 15435 were an example of shifting dietary preferences in plesiosaurs, who fed primarily on cephalopods for most of their evolutionary history, before coming to rely more heavily on fishes during the Late Cretaceous.

They also noted that some of NJSM 15435's gastroliths were scarred by rounded chips and arc-shaped marks. These were likely inflicted by contact with other gastroliths during the churning of the animal's stomach, and constituted physical evidence that plesiosaurs used their gastroliths to help break down their food during digestion. Cicimurri and Everhart disputed the hypothesis that plesiosaurs used their gastroliths for ballast on the grounds that swallowing and vomiting such stones would be relatively difficult for the long-necked forms and their feeding grounds may have been hundreds of miles from sources of stones.

- Everhart resumed the study of the partially digested plesiosaur skull bones, FHSM VP-13966. He sought the expertise of Ken Carpenter due to his relevant 1996 paper on short-necked plesiosaurs. Carpenter identified the bones as probable Dolichorhynchops remains.
- Noe published another study of Pachycostasaurus. He changed his mind regarding its diet. Where previously he believed it to feed on soft-bodied animals, the robust and "heavily ornamented" build of its teeth suggested it fed on harder, bonier prey.

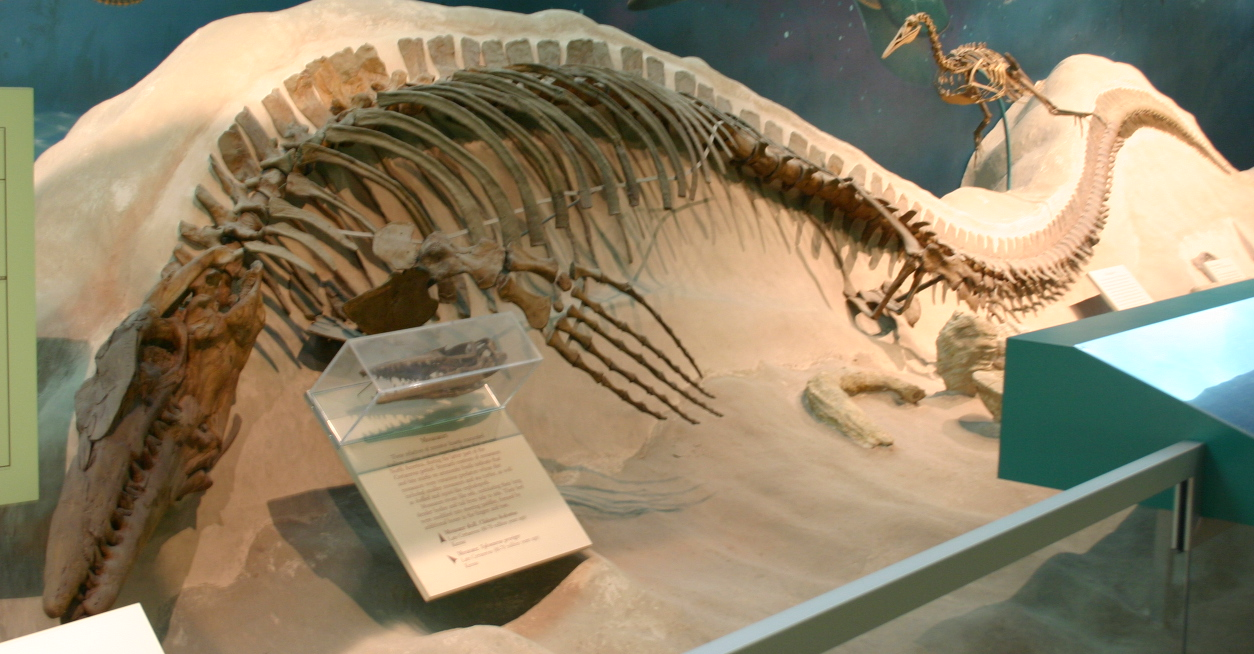
Life restoration of Leptocleidus capensis.

September

- Eberhard Frey, Celine Bachy, and Wolfgang Stinnesbeck gave a presentation on the Aramberri pliosaur remains to the European Workshop on Vertebrate Paleontology in Florence, Italy. The paleontologists could not identify its species.

September 11

- Everhart was forced to cancel plans to examined the Tylosaurus specimen USNM 8898 and its polycotylid dinner USNM 9468 due to the September 11th terrorist attacks.

November

- Everhart was finally able to examine the tylosaur specimen with the polycotylid stomach contents.

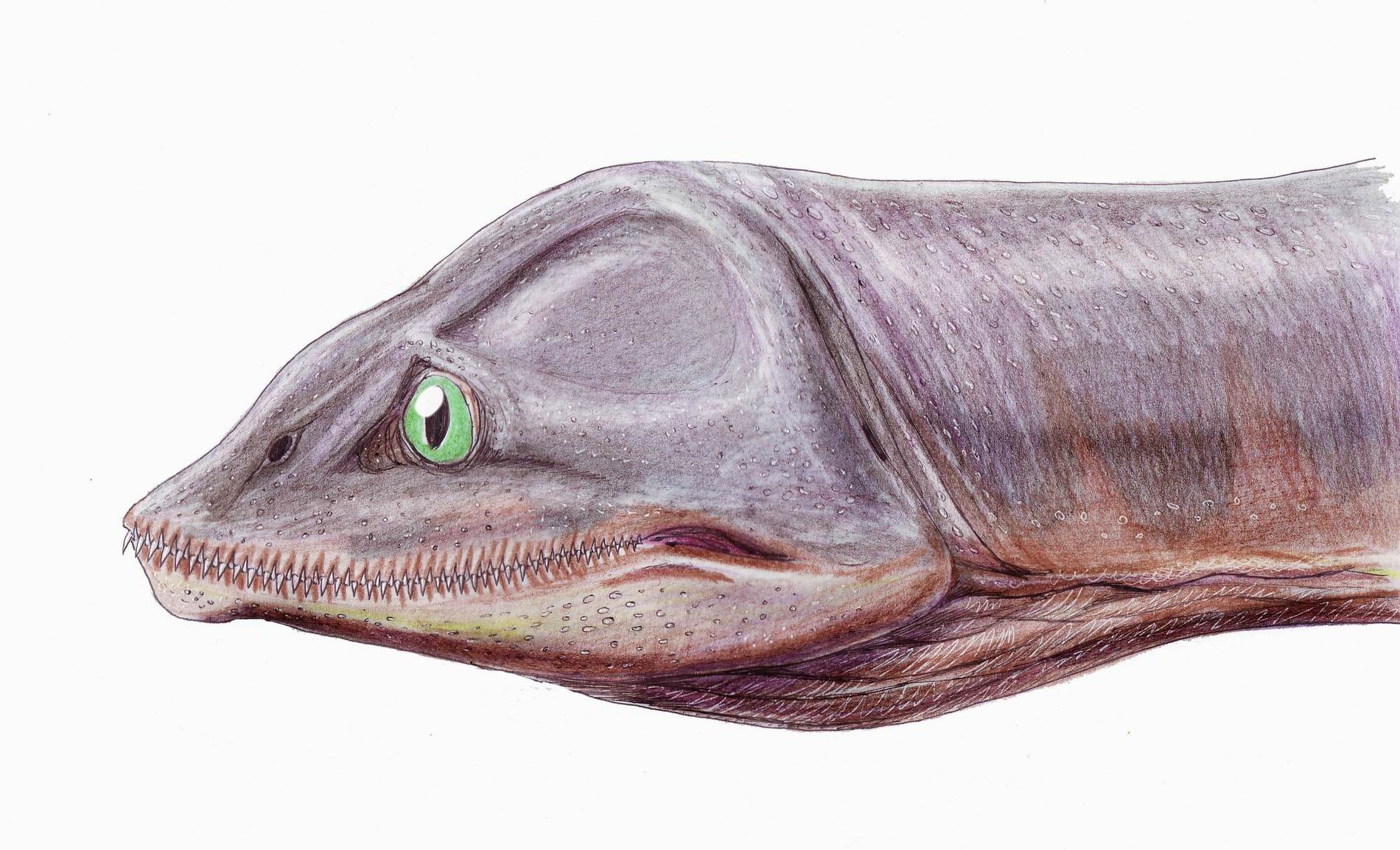
Life restoration of Kaiwhekea.

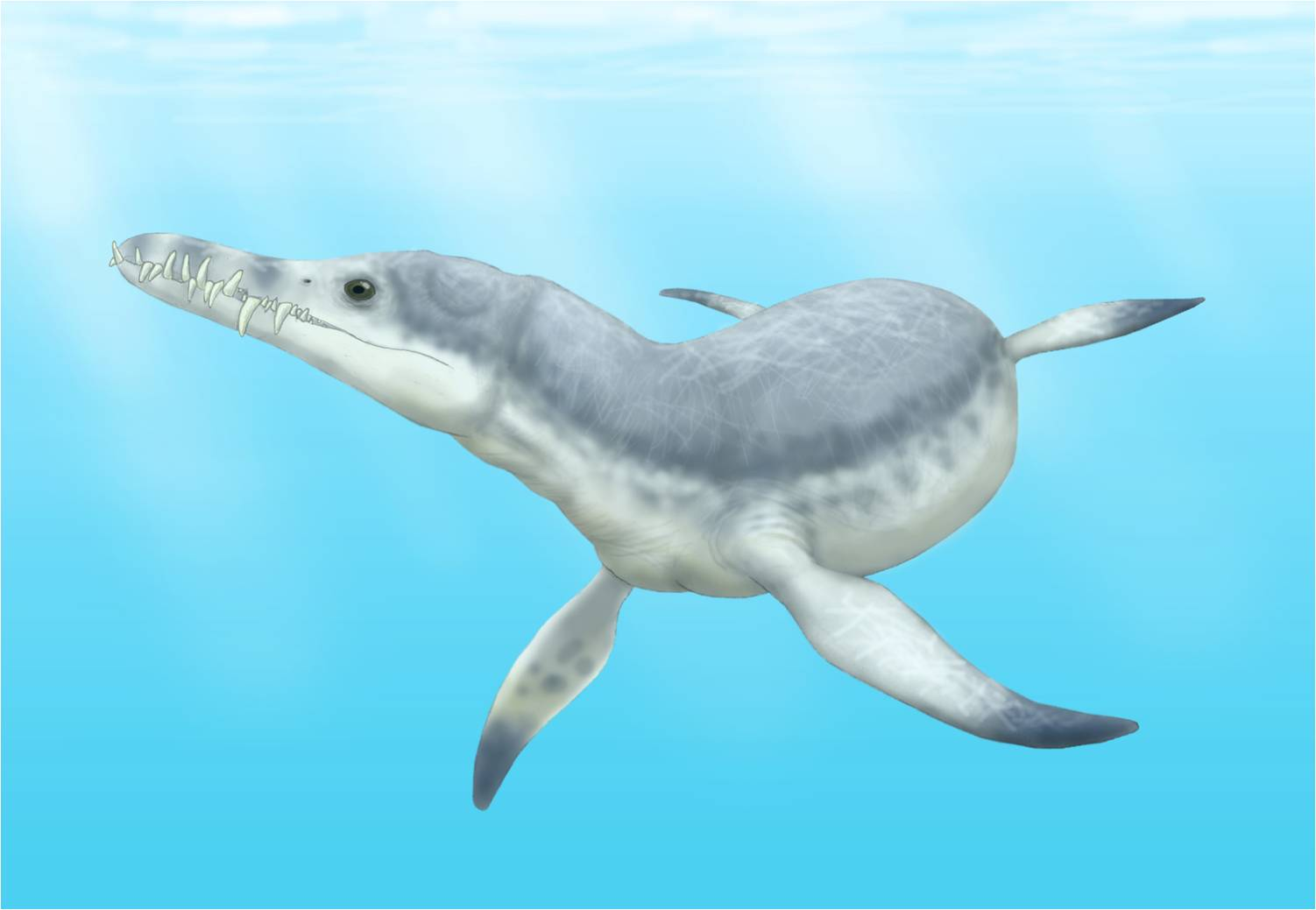
Life restoration of Edgarosaurus

==== 2001–2002 ====
- Robin O'Keefe publishes a series of papers examining the aspect ratios of plesiosaur flippers and comparing them to the wings of birds, bats, and aircraft. O'Keefe concluded that long-necked plesiosaurs were long-distance swimmers, while pliosaurs were more maneuverable.

==== 2002 ====
- Cruickshank and Fordyce described the new species Kaiwhekea katiki.
- Druckenmiller described the new species Edgarosaurus muddi.
- Michael Everhart examined FHSM VP-398 and found Sternberg's original note revealing that these fossils had been collected at the same site as the 1991 Elasmosaurus discovery. Everhart realized that the remains discovered there collectively represented most of the bones that had been missing from the Elasmosaurus type specimen. He inferred that they may represent fragments that fell off of the decomposing type carcass while it was adrift, before its final burial and fossilization.
- An elasmosaur specimen with over 600 associated gastroliths was discovered in the Pierre Shale of Nebraska. The specimen is now catalogued as UNSM 1111–002.

December 30

- The BBC began making sensational claims about the Aramberri pliosaur, claiming that the unidentified pliosaur was a Liopleurodon, that it was 65 feet long, that its teeth were the size of machetes, and its jaws powerful enough to crush granite.

==== 2003 ====
- The University of Nebraska led the excavation of a long-necked plesiosaur skeleton on local Santee Sioux land. The Santee people requested that the skeleton be mounted and displayed with a plaque acknowledging them as the source of the fossils and as having given permission for the University of Nebraska State Museum to display the remains. However, the museum claims it could not honor the request as it did not have the funding to mount the skeleton for display, and it further claimed that the land the fossils were recovered from was of "disputed" ownership.
- Mulder and others reported the presence of elasmosaur remains in Europe.

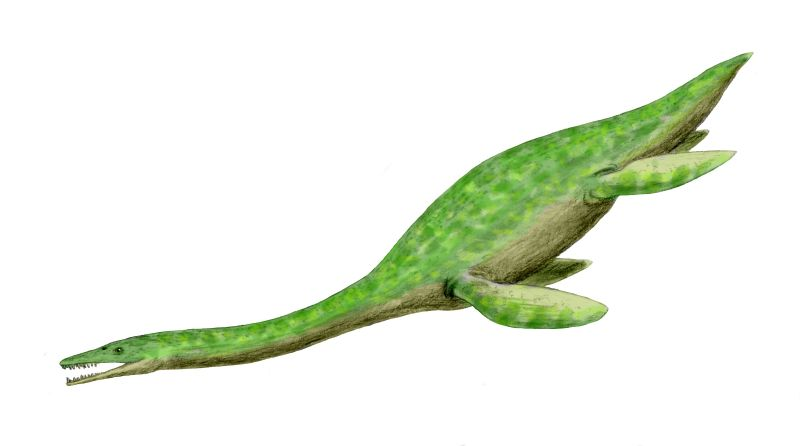
Life restoration of Thililua

- Sato described the new genus and species Terminonatator ponteixensis. In his study of the animal's skeleton, he found that the vertebral discs in the neck were flat on both sides and packed tightly together. He estimated that there would have been only about 0.5 cm of cartilaginous padding between these discs. These observations provided additional evidence for a lack of flexibility in plesiosaur necks.
- Everhart argued contrary to Carpenter's 1996 paper that polycotylids were present throughout the life of the Western Interior Seaway.
- Everhart finally described the partially digested partial plesiosaur skull he discovered in 1992. These were among the earliest known plesiosaur fossils in the Smoky Hill Chalk. He has since concluded that the animal that partially digested the remains was probably a shark, which would go on to vomit them up before they were buried and preserved.
- Bardet and others described the new species Thililua longicollis.

==== 2004 ====
- Michael Everhart found Charles H. Sternberg's account of the discovery of the Elasmosaurus sternbergi type specimen in his 1932 book. This allowed Everhart to verify the specimen's geographic and stratigraphic provenance.
- Everhart argued that the greater abundance of arc shaped marks and rounded divots in plesiosaur gastroliths compared to rocks deposited by ancient rivers and sea shores was evidence for their use in the breakdown of plesiosaurs' food.
- Everhart redescribed the Tylosaurus specimen USNM 8898 and its polycotylid dinner USNM 9468. Contrary to Sternberg's original assessment of the stomach contents as representing a "huge plesiosaur" Everhart found it to be a young polycotylid only about 2-2.5 m long.
- Noe et al. described the new species Pliosaurus portentificus.

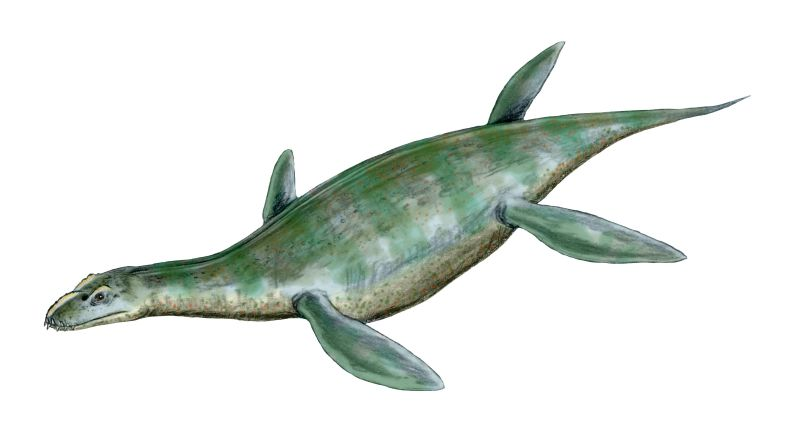
Life restoration of Umoonasaurus, described by Kear in 2006

==== 2005 ====
- Sato described the new species Dolichorhynchops herschelensis.
- Sachs described the species now known as Eromangasaurus australis.
- Buchy et al. described the new species Manemergus anguirostris.
- The plesiosaur remains found at Ancient Echoes Interpretive Centre near Herschel, Saskatchewan, a completely new species, Dolichorhynchops herschelensis, by Dr. Tamaki Sato, a Japanese vertebrate paleontologist.

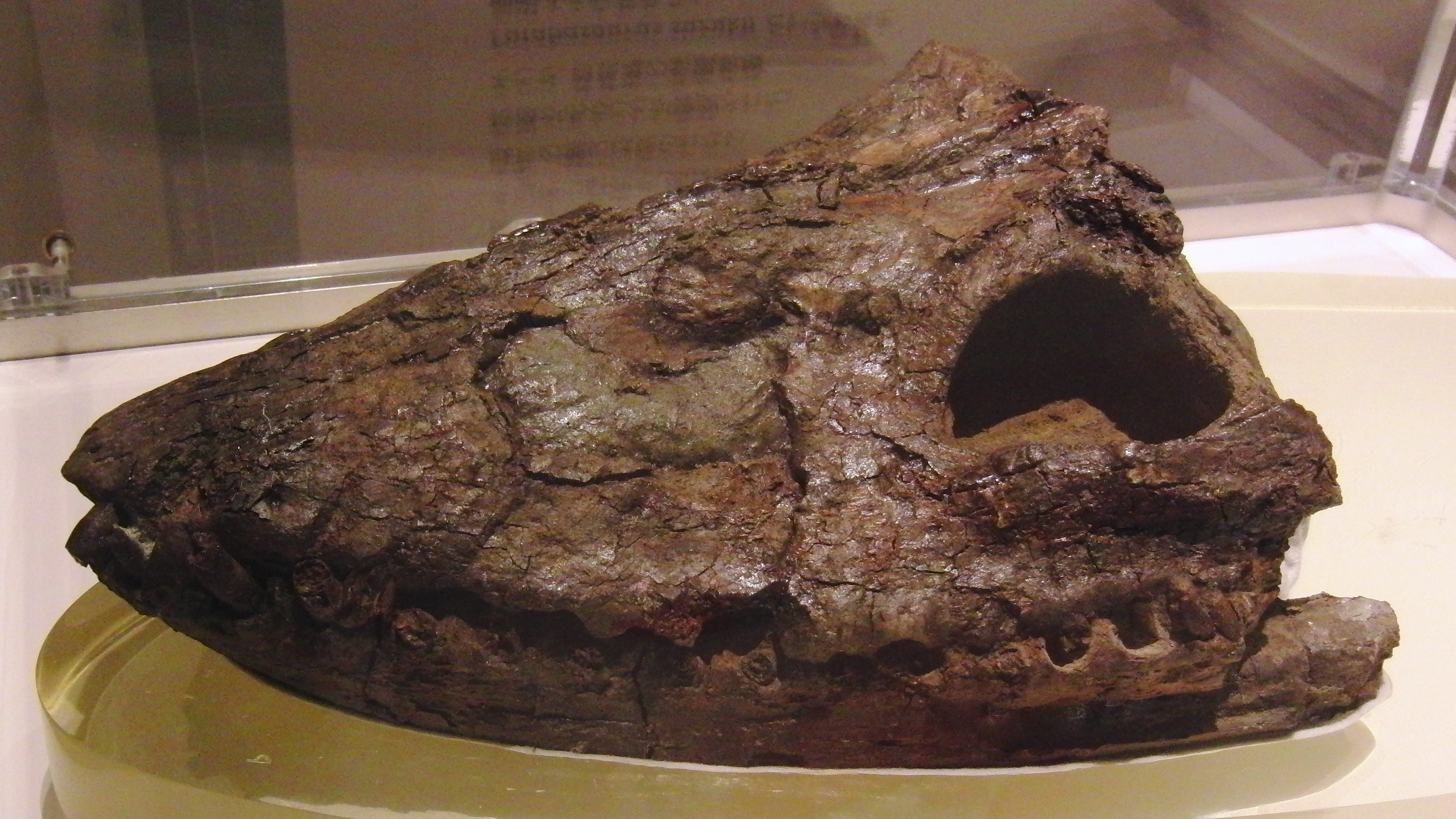
Skull of Futabasaurus suzukii. F. suzukii was described by Sato and others in 2006.

==== 2006 ====
- Buchy described the new species Libonectes atlasense.
- Kear described the new species Umoonasaurus demoscyllus.
- Kear described the new species Opallionectes andamookaensis.
- Sato et al. described the new species Futabasaurus suzukii.

==== 2007 ====
- Albright et al. described the new species Eopolycotylus rankini.
- Albright et al. described the new species Palmula quadratus.

=== 2010s ===
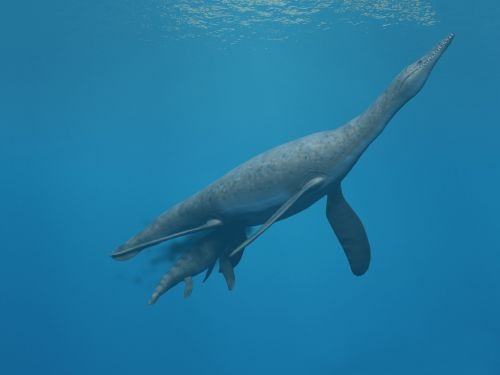
Restoration of a Polycotylus giving birth.

==== 2010 ====
- Sennikov and Arkhangelsky described the new genus and species Alexeyisaurus karnoushenkoi.
- Smith and Vincent described the new genus Meyerasaurus.

==== 2011 ====
- F. Robin O'Keefe and Luis M. Chiappe concluded the debate on plesiosaur reproduction, reporting the discovery of a gravid female plesiosaur with a single large embryo preserved inside her. They concluded that like marine mammals, but unlike many reptiles, plesiosaurs had a K-selected reproductive strategy.
- Berezin described the new genus and species Abyssosaurus nataliae
- Benson and others described the new species Hauffiosaurus tomistomimus
- Ketchum and Benson described the new genus and species Marmornectes candrewi
- Schwermann and Sander described the new genus and species Westphaliasaurus simonsensii
- Vincent and others described the new genus and species Zarafasaura oceanis

Albertonectes with a human to scale.

==== 2012 ====
- Kubo, Mitchell and Henderson described the new genus and species Albertonectes vanderveldei.
- Vincent and Benson described the new genus and species Anningasaura lymense.
- Benson, Evans and Druckenmiller described the new genera and species Avalonnectes arturi, Eoplesiosaurus antiquior, and Stratesaurus taylori.
- Knutsen, Druckenmiller and Hurum described the new genus and species Djupedalia engeri.
- McKean described the new species Dolichorhynchops tropicensis.
- Smith, Araújo and Mateus described the new genus and species Lusonectes sauvagei.

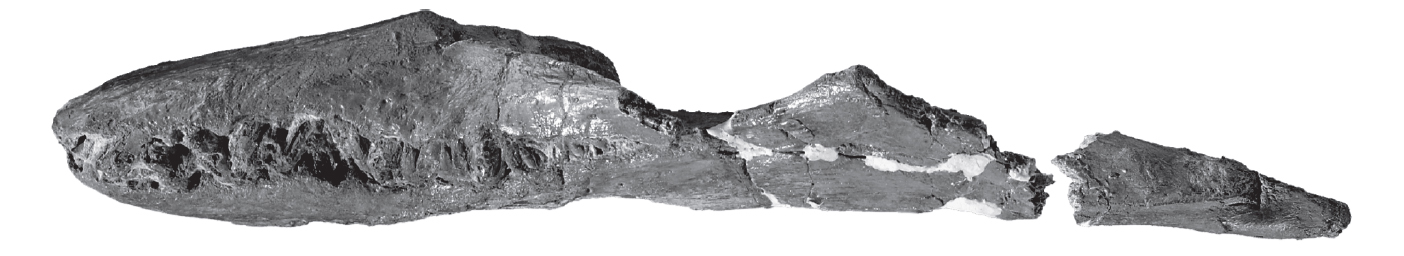
Jaws of Cryonectes.

- Knutsen, Druckenmiller and Hurum described the new species Pliosaurus funkei
- Knutsen, Druckenmiller and Hurum described the new genus Spitrasaurus and two species, S. wensaasi, and S. larseni.

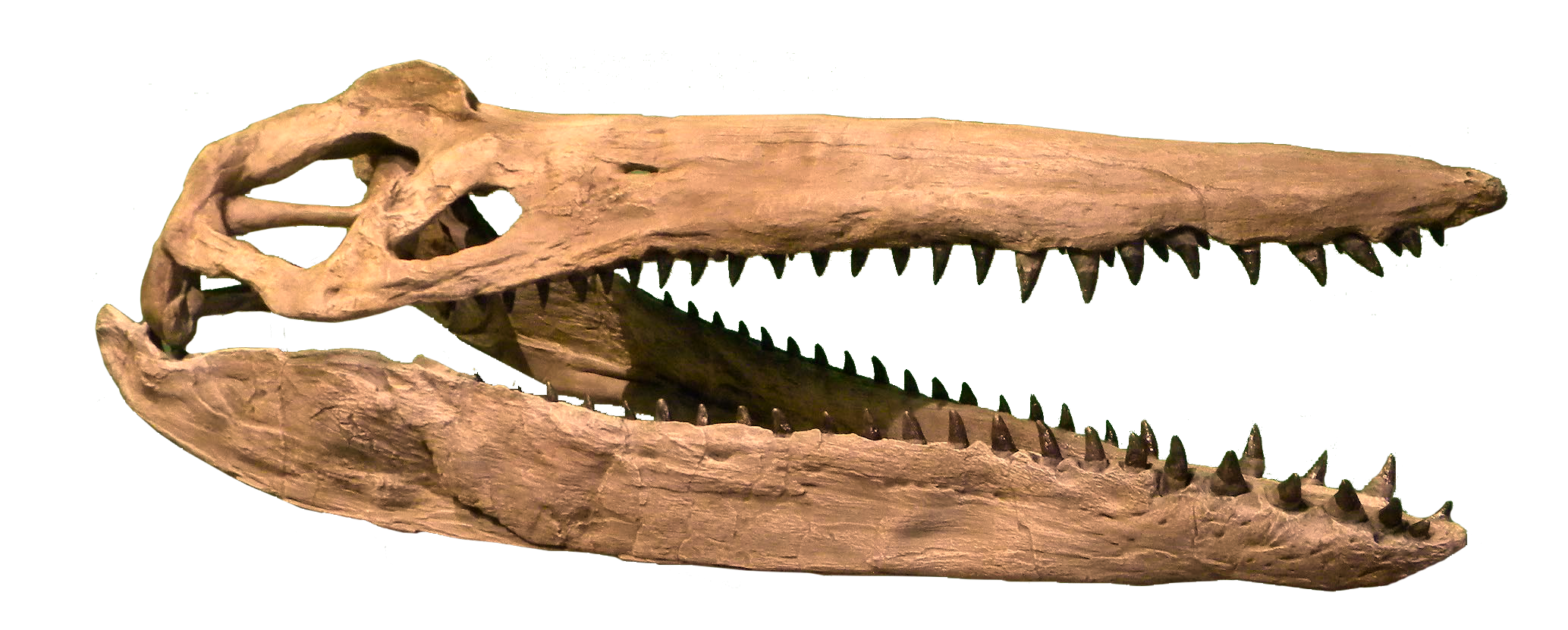
Skull of Megacephalosaurus

==== 2013 ====
- Benson and others described the new genus Hastanectes and the new genus and species Vectocleidus pastorum.
- Vincent, Bardet and Mattioli described the new genus and species Cryonectes neustriacus
- Hampe described the new genus and species Gronausaurus wegneri
- Schumacher, Carpenter and Everhart described the new genus and species Megacephalosaurus eulerti
- Benson and others described the new Pliosaurus species P. carpenteri, P. kevani, and P. westburyensis.

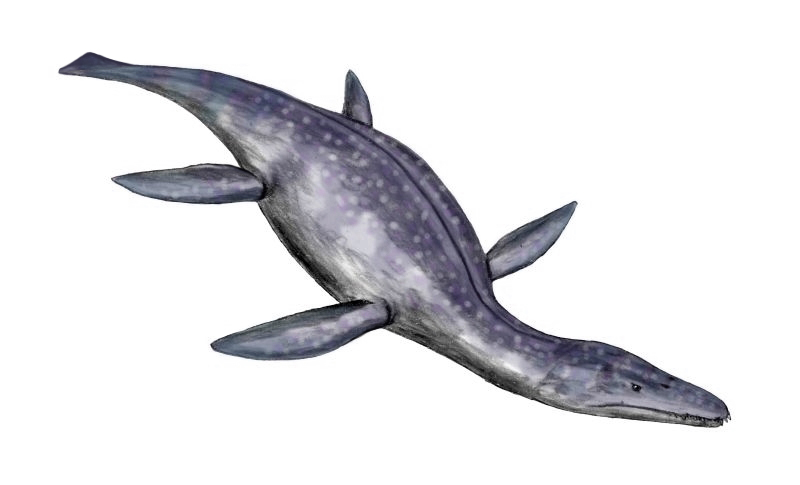
Life restoration of Atychodracon.

==== 2014 ====
- Otero and others described the new species Aristonectes quiriquinensis.
- Gasparini and O'Gorman described the new species Pliosaurus patagonicus.

==== 2015 ====
- Cau and Fanti described the new genus and species Anguanax zignoi.
- Smith described the new genus Atychodracon.
- Araújo and others described the new genus and species Cardiocorax mukulu.
- O'Gorman and others described the new genus and species Vegasaurus molyi.
- A study on the teeth replacement patterns during the ontogeny in pliosaurids is published by Sassoon, Foffa & Marek (2015).

==== 2016 ====
- Otero and others described the new genus and species Alexandronectes zealandiensis.
- O'Gorman described the new genus Kawanectes.
- Páramo and others described the new genus and species Stenorhynchosaurus munozi.
- Cheng and others described the new genus Dawazisaurus.
- Klein and others described the new species Lariosaurus vosseveldensis.
- Efimov, Meleshin and Nikiforov described the new species Polycotylus sopozkoi.
- A reassessment of fossils attributed to the genus Polyptychodon is published by Madzia (2016), who considers the type species of this genus, P. interruptus, to be nomen dubium, and the genus Polyptychodon to be a wastebasket taxon.
- O'Gorman (2016) provides a new diagnosis for Fresnosaurus drescheri and describes additional plesiosaur material from the Late Cretaceous (Maastrichtian) Moreno Formation (California, USA), which he interprets as representing the first aristonectine plesiosaur reported from the Northern Hemisphere.
- A redescription of the holotype specimen of Brancasaurus brancai and a study on the phylogenetic relationships of the species is published by Sachs, Hornung & Kear (2016), who consider the species Gronausaurus wegneri to be a junior synonym of B. brancai.

==== 2017 ====
- Gómez-Pérez and Noè described the new genus and species Acostasaurus pavachoquensis.
- Sachs, Hornung, and Kear described the new genus and species Lagenanectes richterae.
- Fischer and others described the new genus and species Luskhan itilensis.
- Frey and others described the new genus and species Mauriciosaurus fernandezi.
- Serratos, Druckenmiller, and Benson described the new genus and species Nakonanectes bradti.
- Wintrich and others described the new genus and species Rhaeticosaurus mertensi.
- Smith and Araújo described the new genus and species Thaumatodracon wiedenrothi.
- A study on the mechanisms generating vertebral counts and their regionalisation during embryo development that were responsible for high plasticity of the body plan of sauropterygians is published by Soul & Benson (2017).
- A study on the function of the long neck in plesiosaurs as indicated by the anatomy of the neck is published by Noè, Taylor & Gómez-Pérez (2017).
- A study on the large, paired openings in the neck vertebrae of plesiosaurs and their implications for inferring the anatomy of the vascular system in the neck of plesiosaurs is published by Wintrich, Scaal & Sander (2017).
- A study on the swimming method of plesiosaurs is published by Muscutt et al. (2017).
- An assessment of the completeness of the plesiosaur fossil record is published by Tutin & Butler (2017).
- A description of a new specimen of Colymbosaurus svalbardensis from the Tithonian–Berriasian Agardhfjellet Formation (Svalbard, Norway), a reevaluation of the diagnostic features of the species and a study on its phylogenetic relationships is published by Roberts et al. (2017).
- A study on the tooth formation cycle in elasmosaurid plesiosaurs is published by Kear et al. (2017).
- A redescription of the holotype specimen of Tuarangisaurus keyesi and a study on the phylogenetic relationships of the species is published by O'Gorman et al. (2017).
- A study on the anatomy of the vertebra of Vegasaurus molyi and its implications for the anatomy of the nervous system of the species is published by O'Gorman & Fernandez (2017).
- A study on the skeletal morphology and histology of a perinatal aristonectine plesiosaur specimen recovered from the López de Bertodano Formation (Seymour Island, Antarctica) is published by O'Gorman, Talevi & Fernández (2017).
- A redescription of the anatomy of the holotype skull of Morturneria seymourensis is published by O'Keefe et al. (2017).
- A reappraisal and a study on the phylogenetic relationships of Mauisaurus is published by Hiller et al. (2017).
- Libonectes atlasense is redescribed by Sachs & Kear (2017), who consider this species to be likely synonymous with Libonectes morgani.
- An elasmosaurid specimen closely related to Vegasaurus molyi, Kawanectes lafquenianum, Morenosaurus stocki and aristonectines is described from the Late Cretaceous (late Maastrichtian) López de Bertodano Formation (Antarctica) by O'Gorman & Coria (2017), who name a new elasmosaurid clade Weddellonectia.

==== 2018 ====
- Sachs and Kear described the new genus and species Arminisaurus schuberti.
- O'Gorman, Gasparini and Spalletti described the new species Pliosaurus almanzaensis.
- Páramo-Fonseca, Benavides-Cabra and Gutiérrez described the new genus and species Sachicasaurus vitae.
- De Miguel Chaves, Ortega and Pérez‐García described the new genus and species Paludidraco multidentatus.
- A study aiming to estimate metabolic rates and bone growth rates in eosauropterygians, especially in plesiosaurs, is published by Fleischle, Wintrich & Sander (2018).
- A study on the variability of the skull morphology in Simosaurus gaillardoti is published by de Miguel Chaves, Ortega & Pérez-García (2018).
- An incomplete mandible of a large-bodied predatory plesiosaur is described from the Lower Cretaceous (Barremian) Deister Formation (Germany) by Sachs et al. (2018).
- The first Jurassic plesiosaur from Antarctica is described from the Upper Jurassic Ameghino (= Nordensköld) Formation (Antarctic Peninsula) by O'Gorman et al. (2018).
- Morphologically diverse pliosaurid teeth are described from the Upper Jurassic (Tithonian) of the Kheta river basin (Eastern Siberia, Russia) and from the Lower Cretaceous (Berriasian and Valanginian) of the Volga region (European Russia) by Zverkov et al. (2018), who argue that their findings challenge the hypothesis that only one lineage of pliosaurids crossed the Jurassic–Cretaceous boundary.
- Complete mandible of Kronosaurus queenslandicus is described from the Albian Allaru Mudstone (Australia) by Holland (2018).
- Description of the skull bones of Abyssosaurus nataliae from the Cretaceous (Hauterivian) of Chuvashia (Russia) is published by Berezin (2018), who also revises the species diagnosis.
- A study on a specimen of Cryptoclidus eurymerus from the Middle Jurassic (Callovian) of Peterborough (United Kingdom), with the left forelimb injured by a predator causing the loss of use of this limb but which nevertheless survived for some time after that injury, is published by Rothschild, Clark & Clark (2018), who also evaluate the implications of this specimen for the various hypotheses on plesiosaur propulsion.
- A study on the range of motion of the neck of an exceptionally preserved specimen of Nichollssaura borealis is published by Nagesan, Henderson & Anderson (2018).
- A study on the morphology of Thililua longicollis and on the phylogenetic relationships of members of the family Polycotylidae is published by Fischer et al. (2018), who name a new clade Occultonectia.
- Two new plesiosaur specimens, including a specimen of the species Libonectes morgani (otherwise known from North American fossils), are described from the Upper Cretaceous (Turonian) deposits of Goulmima (Morocco) by Allemand et al. (2018).
- Description of a skull and partial postcranial skeleton of a juvenile elasmosaurid from the Upper Cretaceous Tahora Formation (New Zealand), referred to the species Tuarangisaurus keyesi, is published by Otero et al. (2018).
- An exceptionally well-preserved elasmosaurid basicranium, providing new information on the anatomy of the skull of elasmosaurids, is described from the Upper Cretaceous (lower Campanian) Rybushka Formation (Russia) by Zverkov, Averianov & Popov (2018).
- Redescription of Aristonectes quiriquinensis, providing new information on the anatomy of this species, is published by Otero, Soto-Acuña & O'keefe (2018).
- Cranial material of a non-aristonectine elasmosaurid plesiosaur is described from the Upper Cretaceous (Maastrichtian) Cape Lamb Member of the Snow Hill Island Formation (Vega Island, Antarctica) by O'Gorman et al. (2018).
- New elasmosaurid specimen is described from the upper Maatrichtian horizons of the López de Bertodano Formation (Antarctica) by O'Gorman et al. (2018), representing one of the youngest non-aristonectine weddellonectian elasmosaurid specimens from Antarctica reported so far, documenting the presence of at least two different non-aristonectine elasmosaurids in Antarctica during the late Maastrichtian, and confirming the coexistence of aristonectine and non-aristonectine elasmosaurids in Antarctica until the end of the Cretaceous.
- Redescription of the holotype of Styxosaurus snowii and a study on the phylogenetic relationships of this species is published by Sachs, Lindgren & Kear (2018).

==== 2019 ====
- Pathological fusions of neck vertebrae are reported in four plesiosaur specimens from different geological horizons by Sassoon (2019).
- A study on the morphology of the teeth and skull of Megacephalosaurus eulerti, and on their implications for assessing the phylogenetic relationships of this species, will be published by Madzia, Sachs & Lindgren (2019).
- New plesiosaur fossils are described from the Barremian levels of the Arcillas de Morella Formation (Spain) by Quesada et al. (2019), including the first leptocleidid fossil reported from the Iberian Peninsula.
- A study on the skull morphology of two specimens of Dolichorhynchops bonneri from the Pierre Shale of South Dakota, as well as on the phylogenetic relationships of this species, is published by Morgan & O'Keefe (2019).
- A study on bone histology and ontogeny of the gravid specimen of Polycotylus latipinnus displayed at the Los Angeles County Museum of Natural History, and on its implications for interpreting a histological growth series in Dolichorhynchops bonneri, is published by O'Keefe et al. (2019).
- Skull and neck bones of an elasmosaurid plesiosaur are described from the Cenomanian Hegushi Formation (Japan) by Utsunomiya (2019), representing the oldest confirmed elasmosaurid in Japan and in East Asia.
- Páramo Fonseca and others described the new genus and species Leivanectes bernardoi.
- Vincent and Storrs described the new genus and species Lindwurmia thiuda.
- Vincent and others described the new species Microcleidus melusinae.

=== 2020s ===
==== 2020 ====
- Roberts and others described the new genus and species Ophthalmothule cryostea.

==== 2023 ====
- Sachs and others referred Simolestes keileni to a new genus Lorrainosaurus.
- Clark and others describe the new genus and species Unktaheela specta and move the species "Dolichorhynchops" bonneri to the new genus Martinectes and "Dolichorhynchops" tropicensis to the new genus Scalamagnus.

==== 2024 ====
- Sachs, Eggmaier and Madzia described a new species and genus of plesiosauroid plesiosaur, Franconiasaurus brevispinus, from the Toarcian deposits of Germany.

== See also ==
- Timeline of paleontology
- Timeline of ichthyosaur research
- Timeline of mosasaur research
- List of plesiosaurs
