= Trematospondylus =

Trematospondylus Temporal range: Middle Jurassic, Bathonian

Scientific classification
- Domain: Eukaryota
- Kingdom: Animalia
- Phylum: Chordata
- Class: Reptilia
- Superorder: †Sauropterygia
- Order: †Plesiosauria
- Family: †Rhomaleosauridae
- Genus: †Trematospondylus; Quenstedt, 1858

Species
- †T. macrocephalus (Quenstedt, 1858) (type)

Genus of rhomaleosaurid plesiosaur from the Middle Jurassic epoch

Trematospondylus ("hole spinner") is a dubious genus of plesiosaurs from the Middle Jurassic of Baden-Württemberg, Germany. The only named species is Trematospondylus macrocephalus. It is one of the earliest scientifically described plesiosaurs and historically has been the first plesiosaur named from Germany. Preserved remains include seven vertebrae.

== Research history ==
T. macrocephalus was first named by Quenstedt in 1858, who found the fossils in the layers of the Dentalienton Formation at Lochen mountain massif in the Zollernalbkreis of Baden-Württemberg. Its species name likely derives from the Macrocephalus oolite that had been deposited directly above the fossils and is named after the ammonite Macrocephalites macrocephalus. The genus name refers to a small opening at the articulation surface of the vertebrae.

Initially, Quenstedt was uncertain about the interrelationships of Trematospondylus and compared it to fishes, dinosaurs and cetiosaurs (the latter had been considered to represent marine reptiles back then). In 1861, he called it a plesiosaur and suggested affinities with Thaumatosaurus.

Trematospondylus had been mentioned in a few additional works but disappeared from the scientific literature until it got redescribed by Sven Sachs and colleagues in 2023. The latter consider Trematospondylus macrocephalus a nomen dubium but also suggest affinities with rhomaleosaurids.

== Description ==
T. macrocephalus is known by seven large vertebrae, among them two caudals and a possible sacral vertebra. The other bones might represent caudals as well. They likely belonged to a mature individual that was similar to Rhomaleosaurus in size.

== Phylogeny ==
Sachs et al. (2023) performed several phylogenetic analyses that nested Trematospondylus within Rhomaleosauridae.

- Rhomaleosauridae
  - Stratesaurus
  - - Macroplata
    - - Avalonnectes
      - - Atychodracon
        - - Trematospondylus
          - Archaeonectrus
          - - Eurycleidus
            - - Rhomaleosaurus
              - - Maresaurus
                - - Borealonectes
                  - Meyerasaurus
