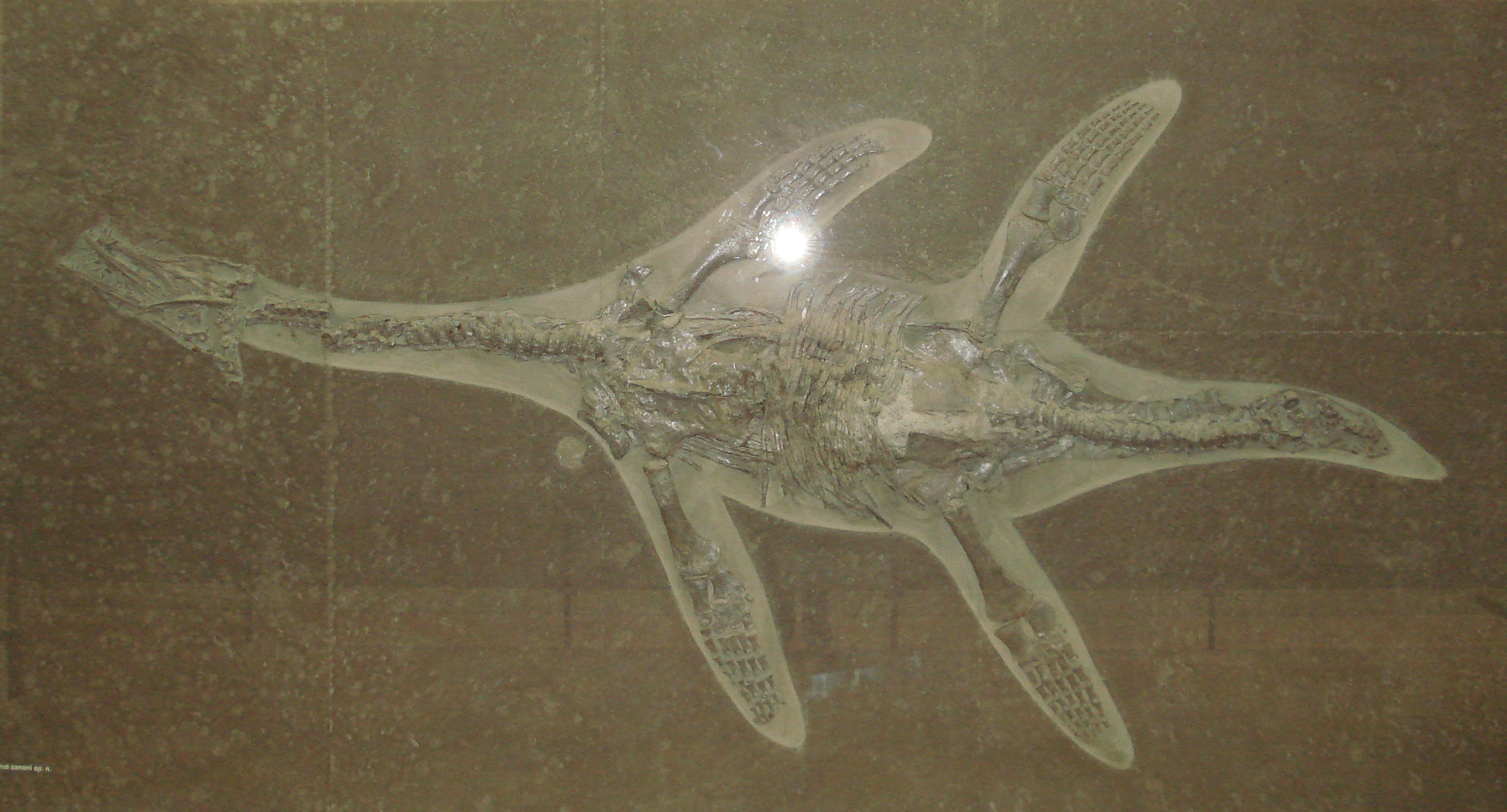
- Entire skeleton in ventral view of H. zanoni.

Scientific classification
- Kingdom: Animalia
- Phylum: Chordata
- Class: Reptilia
- Superorder: †Sauropterygia
- Order: †Plesiosauria
- Suborder: †Pliosauroidea
- Family: †Pliosauridae
- Genus: †Hauffiosaurus; O'Keefe, 2001

Species
- †H. longirostris (Tate & Blake, 1876); †H. tomistomimus Benson et al., 2011; †H. zanoni O'Keefe, 2001 (type)

Synonyms
- Macroplata longirostris Tate & Blake, 1876; Plesiosaurus longirostris Tate & Blake, 1876

= Hauffiosaurus =

Hauffiosaurus Temporal range: Early Jurassic, 182.7–180.7 Ma

Extinct genus of reptiles

Hauffiosaurus is an extinct genus of Early Jurassic (early Toarcian stage) pliosaurid plesiosaur known from Holzmaden of Germany and from Yorkshire of the United Kingdom. It was first named by Frank Robin O’Keefe in 2001 and the type species is Hauffiosaurus zanoni. In 2011, two additional species were assigned to this genus: H. longirostris and H. tomistomimus.

== Description ==
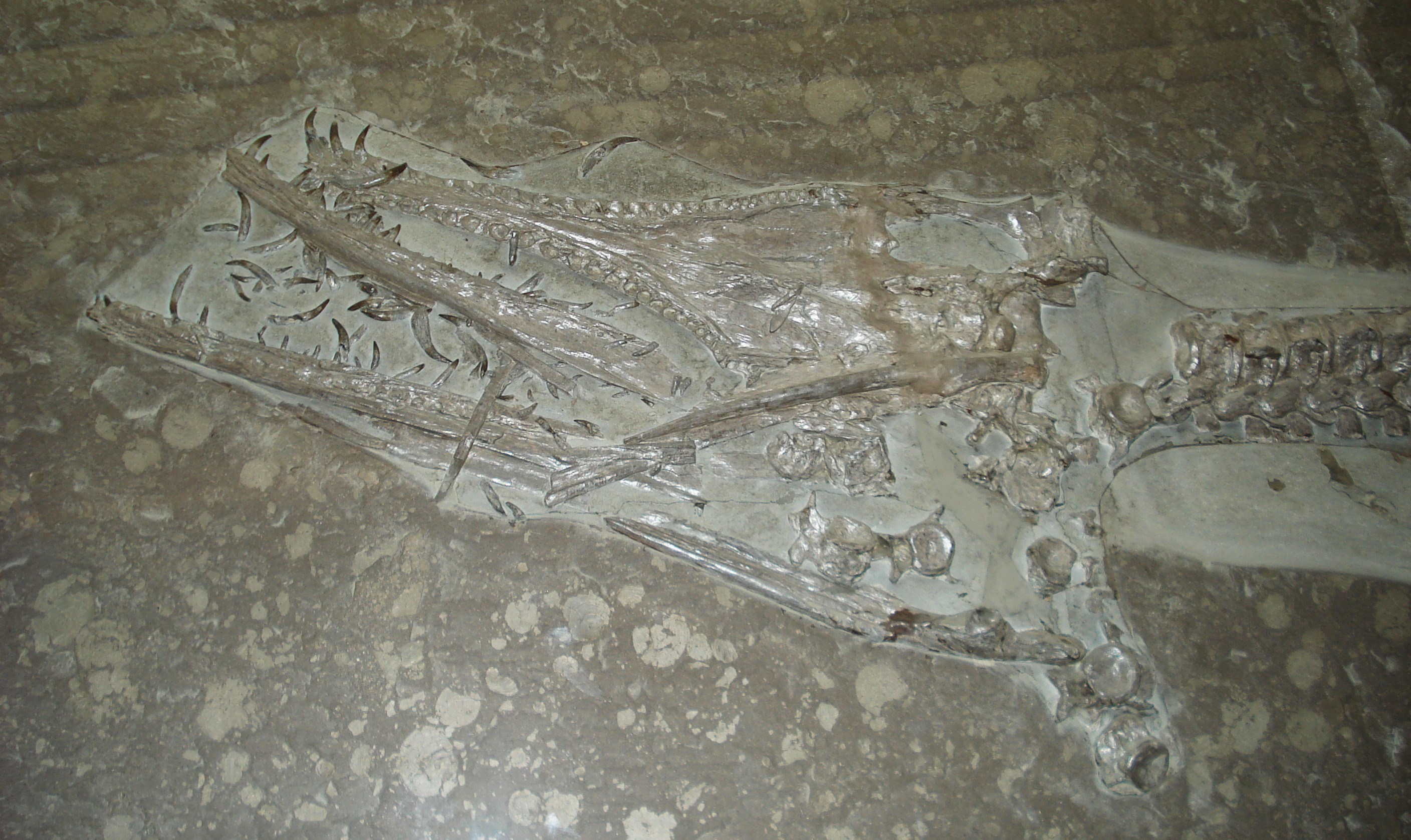
Skull, jaws, and cervical vertebrae of H. zanoni

The holotype specimen of Hauffiosaurus, housed in the Hauff Museum, is an almost complete and articulated skeleton, found from the Posidonien-Schiefer, dating to early Toarcian stage of the Early Jurassic. The holotype specimen preserved in a single block of the original matrix, exposed in ventral view. The body outline visible around the specimen is an artifact of preparation, not preservation; no remains of soft tissue were preserved. The skeleton was discovered during the early 19th Century, in beds of the famous Posidonien-Schiefer lagerstätte at Holzmaden, Baden-Württemberg, in southeastern Germany. However, it was not recognized as a valid taxon, and no thorough description of the fossil was made until 2001. The specific name honours Robert Thomas Zanon, who was the first to recognise the specimen as a separate genus.

Hauffiosaurus zanoni is a plesiosaur of medium size, measuring 3.4 metres (11 ft). The skull measures about 430 millimetres (1 ft) along the midline. The holotype is an adult individual, but incomplete fusion of the pectoral and pelvic girdle indicate it is not an old adult. The specimen is displayed at the Urwelt-Museum Hauff, Holzmaden. The exact phylogenetic position of Hauffiosaurus within the Plesiosauria has yet to be resolved, though Vincent (2011) states that it may "reasonably be placed within the Pliosauroidea".

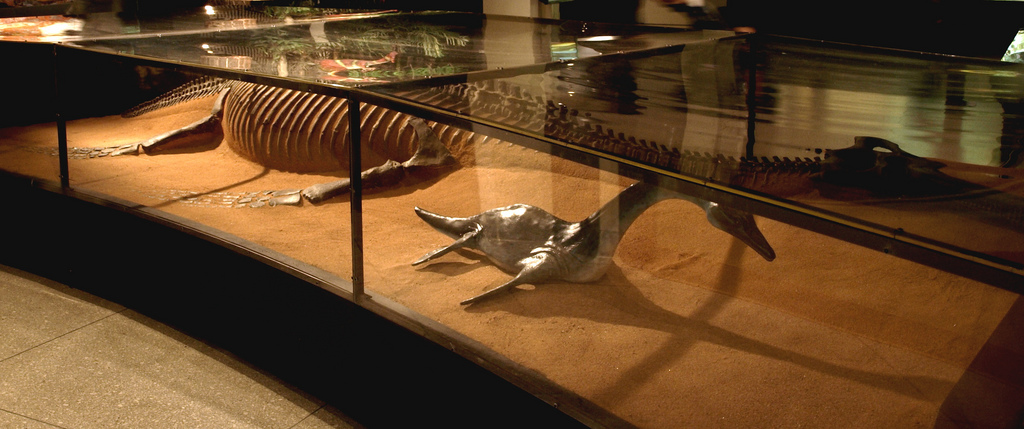
Hauffiosaurus longirostris skeleton and model

A second species, H. tomistomimus, was named by Roger B. J. Benson, Hilary F. Ketchum, Leslie F. Noè and Marcela Gómez-Pérez in 2011. It is known from the holotype and only specimen, MMUM LL 8004, an almost complete, three-dimensionally preservedand and articulated skeleton, found from the Hildoceras bifrons Zone (181.2–180.7 Ma) of the Alum Shale Member, Whitby Mudstone Formation, dating to early Toarcian stage. This skeleton was discovered in Yorkshire, UK. The holotype of H. tomistomimus measures 4.83 metres (15.8 ft) long.

Benson et al. (2011) also reassigned Macroplata longirostris (originally Plesiosaurus longirostris) to Hauffiosaurus. The holotype and only specimen of H. longirostris, MCZ 1033, found from the Harpoceras serpentinum Zone (182.7–181.2 Ma) of the Jet Rock Member, Whitby Mudstone Formation, early Toarcian of Yorkshire, England. The individual to which this specimen belongs is estimated to have measured approximately 4.83 m (15.8 ft) in total body length.

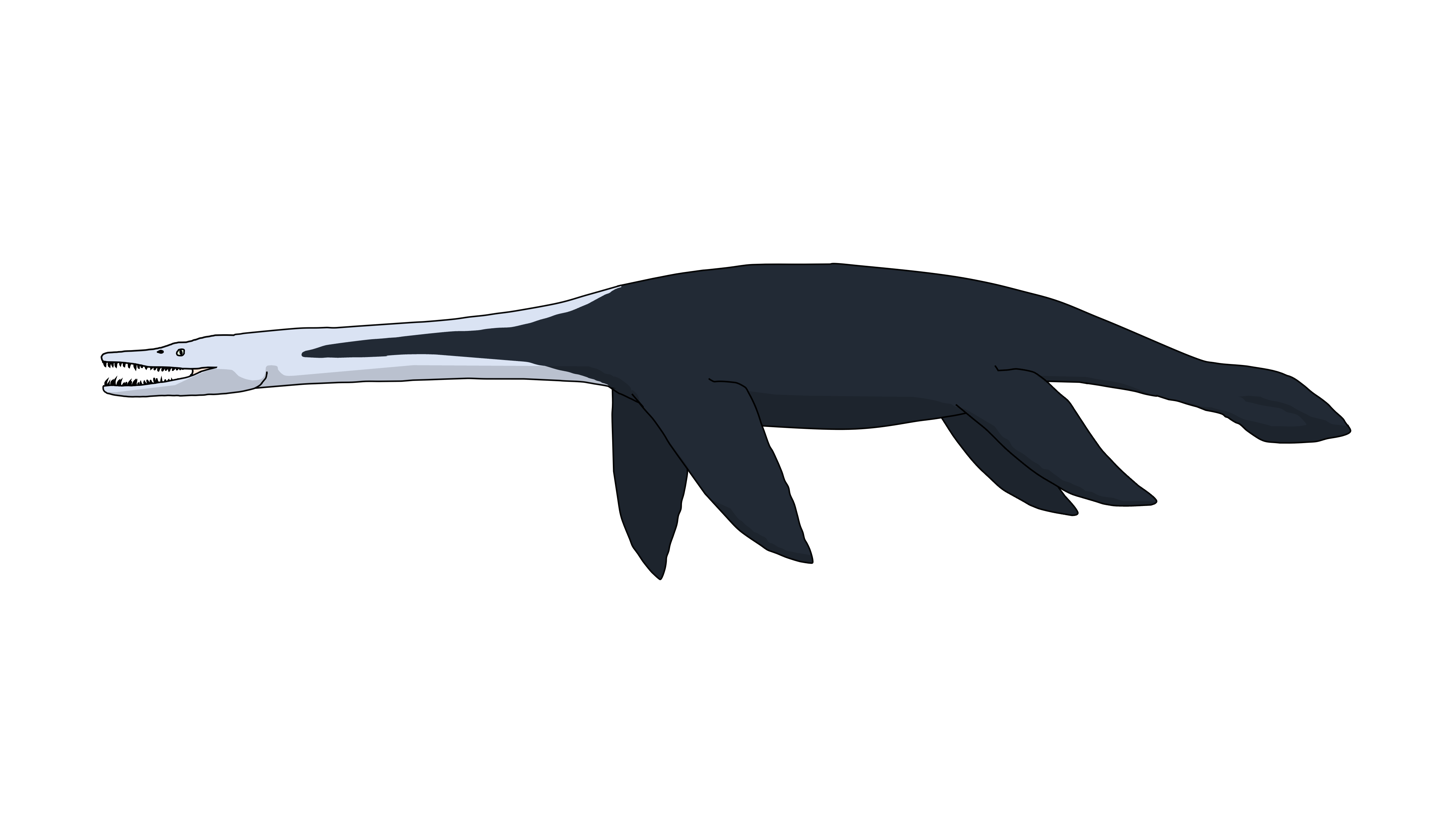
Speculative life reconstruction of Hauffiosaurus zanoni

Few Early Jurassic plesiosaurians have the sort of long, thin snout present in Hauffiosaurus, a shape usually considered to indicate a diet of fish (ichthyophagy). The teeth are slender and elongated and possess fine longitudinal ridges. This sort of tooth, coupled with the long rostrum seen in this genus is effective in piercing soft prey.

== Phylogeny ==
Smith & Dyke, 2008 were the first who found Hauffiosaurus to be basal pliosauroid. Benson, Ketchum, Noè and Gómez-Pérez who assigned two additional species to this genus, confirmed the affinity of this taxon to Pliosauroidea using cladistic analysis which was based on Ketchum & Benson's (2010) analysis. Cladogram after Benson et al., 2011:

- Plesiosauria
  - Anningasaura
  - - Attenborosaurus
    - Neoplesiosauria
      - Plesiosauroidea
      - Pliosauroidea
        - - Atychodracon
          - - - Archaeonectrus
              - Macroplata
            - - "Plesiosaurus" macrocephalus
              - Hauffiosaurus
                - H. longirostris
                - - H. tomistomimus
                  - H. zanoni
        - - - Maresaurus
            - - Meyerasaurus
              - Rhomaleosaurus
          - - Eurycleidus
            - Pliosauridae

With the description of Marmornectes in 2011, Ketchum & Benson suggested for the first time that many basal plesiosaurs and pliosauroids are members of Pliosauridae and Rhomaleosauridae. Both Rhomaleosauridae and Pliosauridae were found to be monophyletic, and the relations between Hauffiosaurus's species remained the same. The cladogram below follows Ketchum & Benson, 2011.

- Pliosauroidea
  - Rhomaleosauridae
    - Anningasaura
    - - - "Plesiosaurus" macrocephalus
        - - Archaeonectrus
          - Macroplata
      - - Atychodracon
        - - Eurycleidus
          - - Rhomaleosaurus
            - - Meyerasaurus
              - Maresaurus
  - Pliosauridae
    - Thalassiodracon
    - - Hauffiosaurus
        - H. longirostris
        - - H. tomistomimus
          - H. zanoni
      - - Attenborosaurus
        - advanced pliosaurids

== See also ==
- List of plesiosaur genera
- Timeline of plesiosaur research
