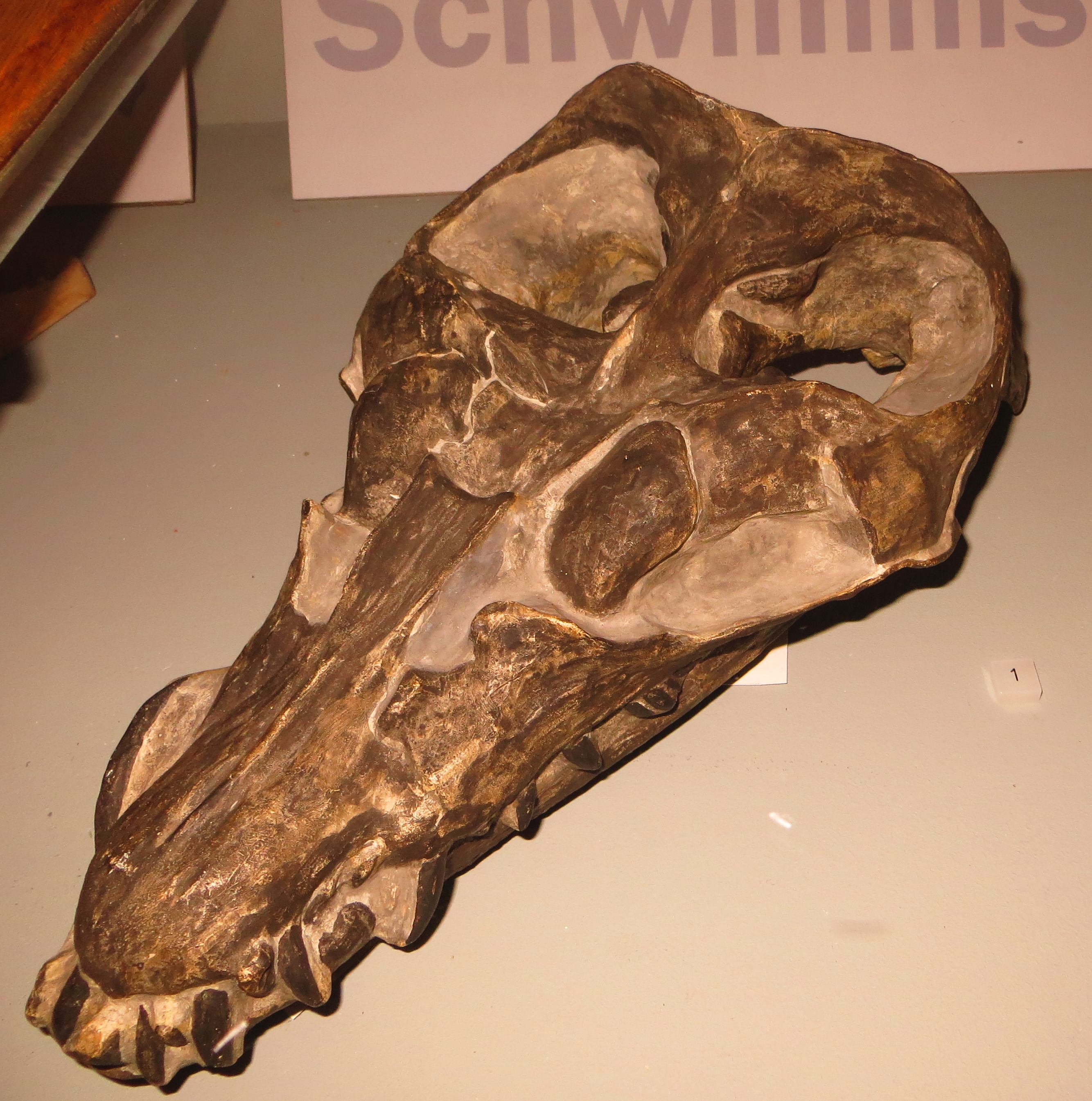
- Skull cast

Scientific classification
- Kingdom: Animalia
- Phylum: Chordata
- Class: Reptilia
- Superorder: †Sauropterygia
- Order: †Plesiosauria
- Genus: †Anningasaura; Vincent and Benson, 2012

Type species
- †Anningasaura lymense Vincent and Benson, 2012

= Anningasaura =

Anningasaura Temporal range: Early Jurassic, 201.3–199.6 Ma

Extinct genus of reptiles

Anningasaura is an extinct genus of basal plesiosaur. It is known from a single type species, A. lymense, discovered in Early Jurassic rocks of Lyme Regis in the United Kingdom.

== Discovery ==
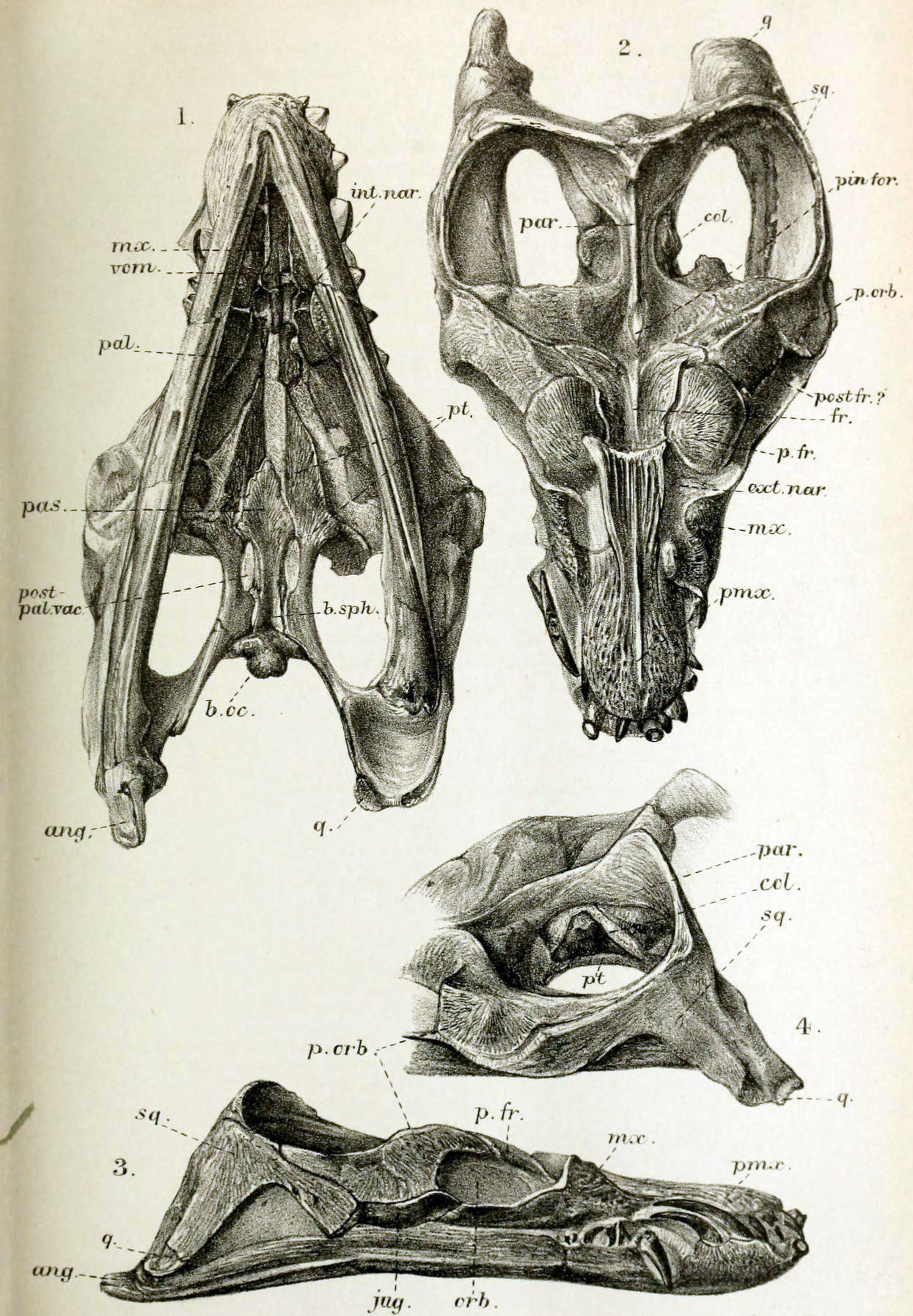
1896 lithograph of the skull of specimen NHMUK OR 49202

Anningasaura is known only from the holotype specimen NHMUK OR 49202, which consists of a complete skull, palate, and mandible, with eight associated cervical vertebrae, including the atlas-axis complex. The partial skeleton came from a juvenile plesiosaur. It was originally referred to "Plesiosaurus" macrocephalus by Charles William Andrews in 1896, which is otherwise known only from the very young type specimen NHMUK PV R1336. NHMUK OR 49202 was collected at Lyme Regis, of Dorset, from the Hettangian to early Sinemurian-aged beds of the Lower Lias Group.

== Description ==
NHMUK OR 49202 possesses plesiomorphic characters, including premaxillae that do not separate the frontals on the midline, narrow cranioquadrate passages and the lack of a constricting groove around the occipital condyle. It also shows several autapomorphies not observed in other plesiosaurians. Its posteromedial processes of the premaxillae (or possible anterior portion of the frontal) forming a dorsoventrally thick, mediolaterally expanded platform and its cultriform process of the parasphenoid is wider mediolaterally than the combined posterior interpterygoid vacuities. It also has two closely spaced foramina in the lateral surface of the exoccipital. Additional autapomorphies are the presence of supplementary foramen penetrating the parietal sagittal crest, the absence of a pterygoid-vomerine contact and the absence of a contact between the pterygoids in palatal aspect.

== Phylogeny ==
A phylogenetic analysis performed by Benson et al. (2012) found it to be a basal, non-neoplesiosaurian, plesiosaur. The cladogram below shows Anningasaura phylogenetic position among other plesiosaurs following Benson et al. (2012).

- Pistosauria
  - "Pistosaurus postcranium"
  - Pistosaurus
  - Yunguisaurus liae
  - - Augustasaurus hagdorni
    - Plesiosauria
      - Bobosaurus forojuliensis
      - - Anningasaura lymense
        - - Rhomaleosauridae
            - Stratesaurus taylori
            - - Macroplata tenuiceps
              - - Avalonnectes arturi
                - - Eurycleidus arcuatus
                  - - Meyerasaurus victor
                    - - Maresaurus coccai
                      - - Atychodracon megacephalus
                        - - Archaeonectrus rostratus
                          - - Rhomaleosaurus cramptoni
                            - - Rhomaleosaurus thorntoni
                              - Rhomaleosaurus zetlandicus
          - Neoplesiosauria
            - Pliosauridae
              - Thalassiodracon hawkinsii
              - - Hauffiosaurus spp.
                - - Attenborosaurus conybeari
                  - advanced pliosaurids (Peloneustes)
            - Plesiosauroidea
              - Eoplesiosaurus antiquior
              - - Plesiosaurus dolichodeirus
                - - - Plesiopterys wildi
                    - Cryptoclidus eurymerus
                  - Microcleididae
                    - Eretmosaurus rugosus
                    - Westphaliasaurus simonsensii
                    - - Seeleyosaurus guilelmiimperatoris
                      - - Microcleidus tournemiensis
                        - - Microcleidus brachypterygius
                          - Microcleidus homalospondylus

== Etymology ==
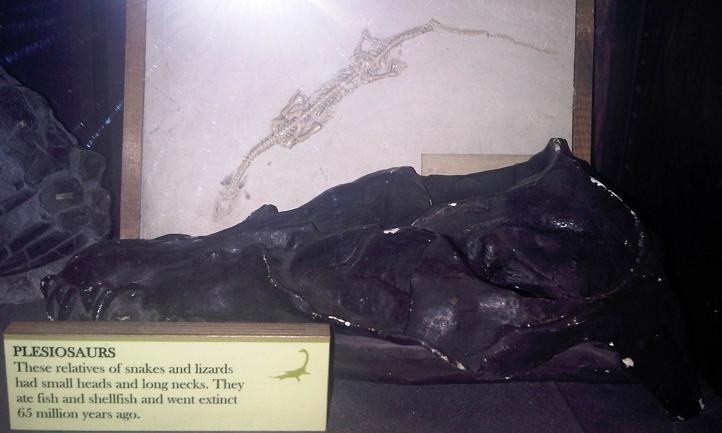
Side view of a skull cast

Anningasaura was first described and named by Peggy Vincent and Roger B. J. Benson in 2012 and the type species is Anningasaura lymense. The generic name honors Mary Anning, a British fossil collector who became known around the world for finds she made in the Jurassic marine fossil beds at Lyme Regis in Dorset. The specific name is derived from the name of the Lyme Regis locality where the only known specimen was collected.

== See also ==
- Timeline of plesiosaur research
- List of plesiosaur genera
