= Thaumatodracon =

Thaumatodracon Temporal range: Sinemurian

Scientific classification
- Kingdom: Animalia
- Phylum: Chordata
- Class: Reptilia
- Superorder: †Sauropterygia
- Order: †Plesiosauria
- Family: †Rhomaleosauridae
- Genus: †Thaumatodracon; Smith & Araújo, 2017

Type species
- Thaumatodracon wiedenrothi Smith & Araújo, 2017

Extinct genus of reptiles

Thaumatodracon is a genus of rhomaleosaurid pliosaur from the early Jurassic found in the United Kingdom. It contains a single species, named by Adam Smith and Ricardo Araújo in 2017.

== History ==
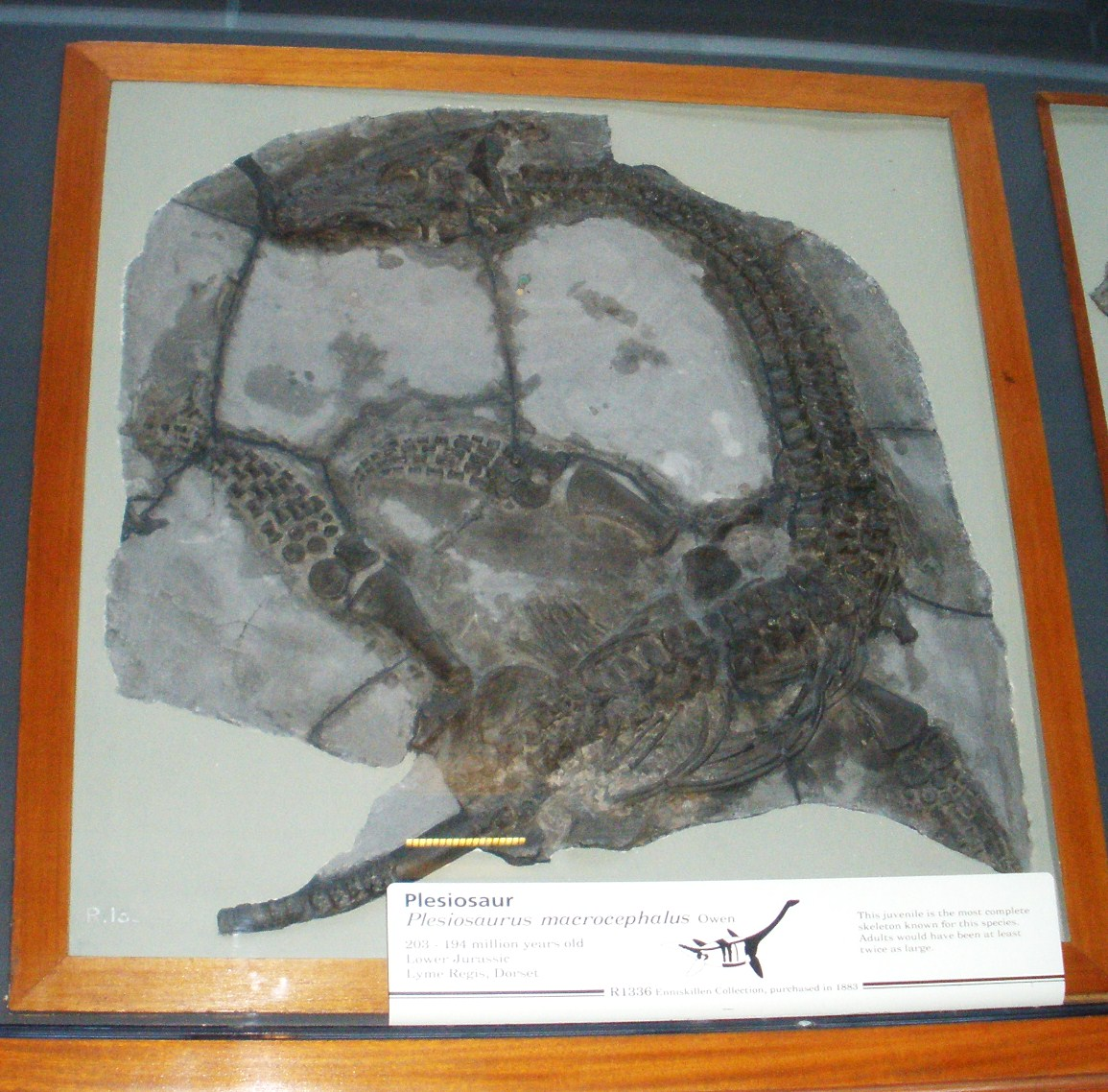
Holotype specimen of "Plesiosaurus" macrocephalus, which may represent a juvenile Thaumatodracon

In early 1969, German amateur paleontologist Kurt Wiedenroth at the coast of Dorset between Lyme Regis and Charmouth discovered a plesiosaur skeleton. At first below the Black Ven cliff he found a chalk nodule containing a series of neck vertebrae. Then the skull proved to present as well. Other matrix pieces with a fossil content were removed. He took the fossils back home to Germany where the very same year he sold them to the Niedersächsisches Landesmuseum Hannover. The find generated little interest. At the time only a few workers studied British plesiosaurs. The skeleton was stowed in depot and only in the nineties partially prepared by Elijah Widmann.

During the early twenty-first century, a strong revival of plesiosaur research manifested itself. Older material was restudied and new genera regularly named. In 2011, plesiosaur experts Ricardo Miguel Nóbrega Araújo and Adam Stuart Smith visited the Hannover museum. Investigating the skeleton, they concluded that it represented a species new to science. In 2012, this was reported in the scientific literature, announcing a special research programme.

In 2017, the type species Thaumatodracon wiedenrothi was named and described by Smith and Araùjo. The generic name is derived from Greek thauma, "wonder", and drakoon, "dragon, snake". The name also refers to the older genus name Thaumatosaurus Meyer 1841; Smith had in 2010 renamed the well-known Thaumatosaurus victor into the separate genus Meyerasaurus. The specific name honours Wiedenroth as discoverer.

The holotype, NLMH 106.058, originated from the Black Ven Mudstone Member of the Charmouth Mudstone Formation dating from the Sinemurian. It consists of a partial skeleton containing the skull, the lower jaws and a complete series of twenty-seven neck vertebrae. Additionally a thirty-five centimetres long block was salvaged, the matrix possibly still surrounding vertebrae or pectoral girdle elements. Hundreds of small fragments are also part of the material. In 2017, all these latter remains had not been prepared yet.

The holotype specimen of the species "Plesiosaurus" macrocephalus was long thought to not belong to that genus, and Smith has informally suggested it is instead a juvenile Thaumatodracon. That would make the Crystal Palace model of this species possibly the first attempt to restore a rhomaleosaurid.

== Description ==
Thaumatodracon was relatively large for a rhomaleosaur, measuring approximately 6.5 meters in length, weighing up to two tons and with a skull length of sixty centimetres.
