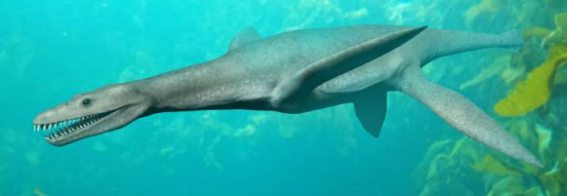
- Life reconstruction

Scientific classification
- Domain: Eukaryota
- Kingdom: Animalia
- Phylum: Chordata
- Class: Reptilia
- Superorder: †Sauropterygia
- Order: †Plesiosauria
- Genus: †Lindwurmia; Vincent and Storrs, 2019
- Species: †L. thiuda

Binomial name
- †Lindwurmia thiuda Vincent and Storrs, 2019

= Lindwurmia =

Lindwurmia Temporal range: Early Jurassic, Hettangian

Extinct genus of plesiosaur

Lindwurmia (named after the Lindwurm) is a rhomaleosaurid plesiosaur from the Early Jurassic of Germany. It contains a single species, Lindwurmia thiuda. It was a small plesiosaur, measuring 2 to 3 m (6.6 to 9.8 ft) long.

== Discovery and naming ==
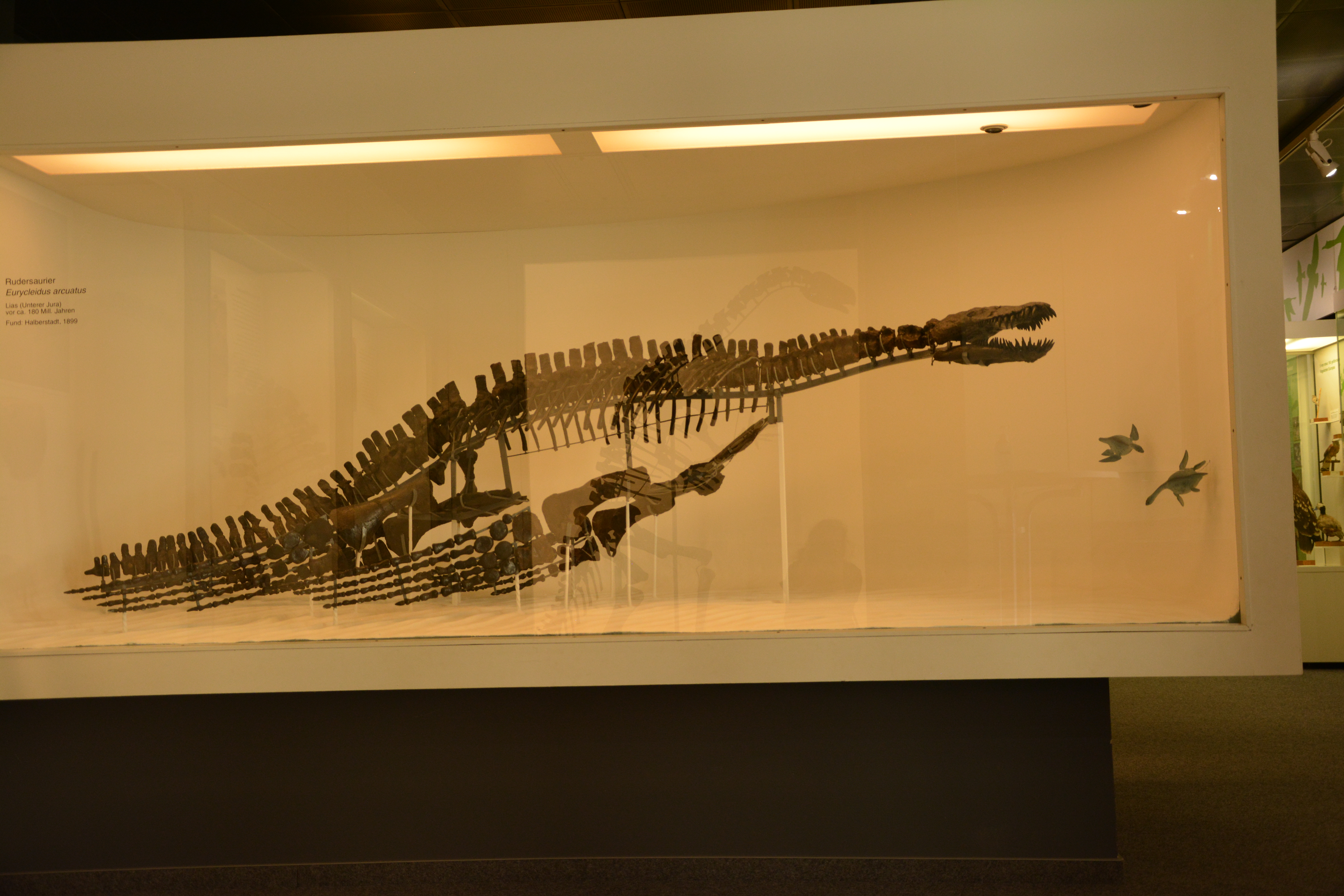
The holotype specimen

The holotype is an incomplete postcranium; the anterior section of the jaws, sixty-nine vertebrae, a partial pectoral girdle, pelvic girdles, and the right fore- and hindlimbs. It was discovered in the Psiloceras johnstoni ammonite subzone in the clay quarry of Thiemeke'shen Ziegelei in Halberstadt, Germany in 1899 by Johannes Maak, with the dragline excavator that hit upon the specimen partially destroying it in the process; Maak had the specimen restored by 1900 and it was subsequently sent to the Halberstadt City Museum.

The specimen was then described by Theodore Brandes, in 1912 and 1914. In 1912, he assigned the specimen to Plesiosaurus (Thaumatosaurus) aff. megacephalo, and in 1914 Brandes re-assigned it to just Thaumatosaurus aff. megacephalo. At an unknown point in time and without any prior scientific research, the Halberstadt City Museum had the specimen labeled as Eurycleidus arcuatus.

In 2019, Peggy Vincent and Glenn William Storrs named and described the type species Lindwurmia thiuda for the specimen. The specific name is the word Þiuda, "people", a word reconstructed by linguists from Gothic þiudisko, "of the people". This has been seen as the origin of Deutsch, "German".

== Description ==
Size comparison of Lindwurmia thiuda

Lindwurmia reached around 3 metres (9.8 ft) long when fully grown.

It has twenty-four cervical vertebrae and five pairs of premaxillary teeth.

== Classification ==
Two different datasets were used to classify Lindwurmia. Vincent & Storrs (2019) found it to be the sister taxon to Anningasaura within Rhomaleosauridae.
