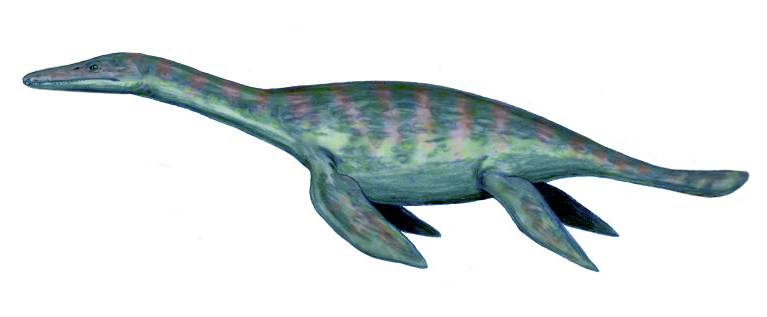
- Restoration of Macroplata tenuiceps

Scientific classification
- Kingdom: Animalia
- Phylum: Chordata
- Class: Reptilia
- Superorder: †Sauropterygia
- Order: †Plesiosauria
- Family: †Rhomaleosauridae
- Genus: †Macroplata; Swinton, 1930

Type species
- †Macroplata tenuiceps Swinton, 1930

= Macroplata =

Macroplata Temporal range: Early Jurassic, 199–195 Ma

Extinct genus of reptiles

Macroplata (meaning "big plate") is an extinct genus of Early Jurassic rhomaleosaurid plesiosaur. Like other plesiosaurs, Macroplata probably lived on a diet of fish, using its sharp needle-like teeth to catch prey. Its shoulder bones were fairly large, indicating a powerful forward stroke for fast swimming. Macroplata also had a relatively long neck, twice the length of the skull, in contrast to pliosaurs. It is known from a nearly complete skeleton NHMUK PV R 5488 (formerly BMNH R 5488) from the Blue Lias Formation (Hettangian) of Harbury, Warwickshire, UK.

A different species, Macroplata longirostris (previously called Plesiosaurus longirostris), which lived somewhat later, during the Toarcian stage, was also included in the genus; however, in 2011, Benson et al. reclassified it as a pliosaurid in the genus Hauffiosaurus, H. longirostris.

== Description ==
Macroplata is estimated around 4.38–4.65 metres (14.4–15.3 ft) in body length and 604 kilograms (1,332 lb) in body mass. bore an elongated skull, with more than half of its cranial length taken up by a roughly triangular snout. The premaxillae (front upper jaw bones) bear six teeth each, with the first being the smallest and the second, third, and fourth the largest. Together, they form the rounded region at the front of the jaw, and have a rough outer surface bearing foramina, ridges, and grooves. The snout is constricted where the premaxillae border the maxillae (the larger upper jaw bones). These bones continue to contact each other until they reach the level of the external nares (openings for the nostrils). While the premaxillae become narrow beyond this point, they extend far back on the skull, forming a ridge rearward of the external nares. The top side of each maxilla is ornamented like that of the premaxillae. The front edges of the orbits (eye openings) are formed by the maxillae. The maxillae also seem to make up the front and outer rims of the external nares, although poor preservation makes it difficult to verify this. The better-preserved maxilla of the holotype bears 18 alveoli (tooth sockets), with the smallest at the back. The maxillary teeth are separated from the premaxillary teeth by a gap (diastema). The teeth of Macroplata have circular cross-sections and possess vertical ridges that all at least come close to the tooth's tip (few actually reach it).

The frontals of Macroplata are long, spanning from external nares to temporal fenestrae (large openings at the back of the skull), and widen towards the back of the skull. They bear foramina and probably formed the rear edges of the external nares. The frontals are separated from each other by the premaxillae in the front and the parietals (bones at the back of the skull roof) at the rear, with a small area of contact between. The frontals articulate with the prefrontals above the orbits. The prefrontals form part the orbits' upper edge. The postfrontals form the border between the orbits and the temporal fenestrae, and each bone bearing a ridge running perpendicularly to the skull's length. Upon the discovery of Macroplata, its pineal foramen was claimed to be both large and small by different sources. As it was later obscured by plaster, its true size is unknown.

The parasphenoid (a midline bone in the rear part of the palate) is smooth and approximately diamond-shaped, with a wide surface at its front that articulates with the pterygoids. The posterior interpterygoid vacuities (openings located on the palate) are roughly elliptical. Unlike in other plesiosaurs, their hind ends are angled inwards, making this trait an autapomorphy of Macroplata. It is unclear where the parasphenoid meets the basioccipital (the lower bone of the rear braincase), although a possible suture between these bones is present roughly at the level of the hind end of the posterior interpterygoid vacuities. This suggests that the rearmost part of the palate was composed of the basioccipital. The occipital condyle (the surface to which the vertebrae articulate) juts out beyond the palate when viewed from below. The occipital condyle is formed solely by the basioccipital, with the exoccipital-opisthoics (side bones of the rear braincase) not participating. The paraoccipital processes (the elongated regions of the exoccipital-opisthoics) of the latter bones bear wide upper surfaces and slope downwards and forwards. The foramen magnum (the opening above the occipital condyle) is constricted into an 8-shape. The supraoccipital (the top bone of the rear braincase) is wider than tall.

The mandibular symphysis (where the two sides of the lower jaw meet and fuse) bears seven or eight tooth pairs and is covered by foramina on its sides. The suture between the dentary (tooth-bearing lower jaw bone) and angular (one of the rear mandibular bones) takes the shape of a straight line sloping upwards and backwards. The splenial (an inner mandibular bone) might form part of the mandibular symphysis. It continues to contact the bottom of the dentary until the angular separates them further rearwards. The angular forms the entire lower surface of the rear mandible, widening below the jaw joint before narrowing to form the lower part of the retroarticular process. The articular forms the top part of the retroarticular process (a spikelike projection of bone behind the jaw joint). The retroarticular process is broad and weakly angled towards the skull's midline.

Macroplata bears 26 cervical (neck) vertebrae. The parts of the atlas and axis, the first two cervical vertebrae, are not entirely fused together. The centrum (vertebral body) of the atlas is surrounded by the crescent-shaped atlantal intercentrum below and the atlantal neural arches on the sides, and is not visible from below. The lower surface of the intercentrum of the axis tapers to a point facing forwards. Beyond the axis, the undersides the cervical centra bear keels, with a prominent pit on each side in which a small subcentral foramen (holes on the bottom of the vertebrae) is located. The moderately long cervical centra are amphicoelous (concave on both sides) and slightly wider than tall. The fronts, backs, and sides of the centra are rough. The zygapophyses span about as wide as the centra, and the joints they articulate with are directed upwards and inwards. The lower parts of the neural spines are narrow from side to side. The cervical vertebrae increase in size towards the back of the neck, and the articulations between the neural arches and centra become increasingly pointed. The cervical ribs are double-headed (the surface connecting to the vertebrae is forked) and their heads are roughly circular.

== Classification ==
Following Benson et al. (2012):

- Plesiosauria
  - Bobosaurus forojuliensis
  - - Anningasaura lymense
    - - Neoplesiosauria
        - Pliosauridae
        - Plesiosauroidea
      - Rhomaleosauridae
        - Stratesaurus taylori
        - - Macroplata tenuiceps
          - - Avalonnectes arturi
            - - Eurycleidus arcuatus
              - - Meyerasaurus victor
                - - Maresaurus coccai
                  - - Atychodracon megacephalus
                    - - Archaeonectrus rostratus
                      - - Rhomaleosaurus cramptoni
                        - - Rhomaleosaurus thorntoni
                          - Rhomaleosaurus zetlandicus

== See also ==
- List of plesiosaur genera
- Timeline of plesiosaur research
