= Yuzhoupliosaurus =

Yuzhoupliosaurus Temporal range: Middle Jurassic

Scientific classification
- Kingdom: Animalia
- Phylum: Chordata
- Class: Reptilia
- Superorder: †Sauropterygia
- Order: †Plesiosauria
- Family: †Rhomaleosauridae
- Genus: †Yuzhoupliosaurus; Zhang, 1985

Type species
- †Yuzhoupliosaurus chengjiangensis Zhang, 1985

Genus of rhomaleosaurid plesiosaur from the Middle Jurassic period

Yuzhoupliosaurus is an extinct genus of rhomaleosaurid plesiosaur found in rocks of the Middle Jurassic in China. The genus is known only from a lower jaw, eighteen vertebrae, fragments of a pectoral girdle and parts of the right hindlimb. It is believed this genus lived in fresh water.

== Etymology ==
The genus was named after Yuzhou (渝州), the previous name of Chongqing, a major city on the Yangtze River where the first fossil of Yuzhoupliosaurus was found.

== Description ==
Paleontologists believe Yuzhoupliosaurus to have been approximatively four meters long. The lower jaws contain five pairs of large teeth and 23 or 24 smaller teeth. The cervical vertebrae are considered "high and short". The anterior cervical ribs are double-headed while the posterior cervical ribs are single-headed. The coracoids are elongated and the clavicles are well-developed.

== See also ==
- List of plesiosaur genera
- Timeline of plesiosaur research

== Sources ==
- Zhang, Y (1985). "A new plesiosaur from Middle Jurassic of Sichuan Basin". Vertebrata PalAsiatica. 23: 235–240.
