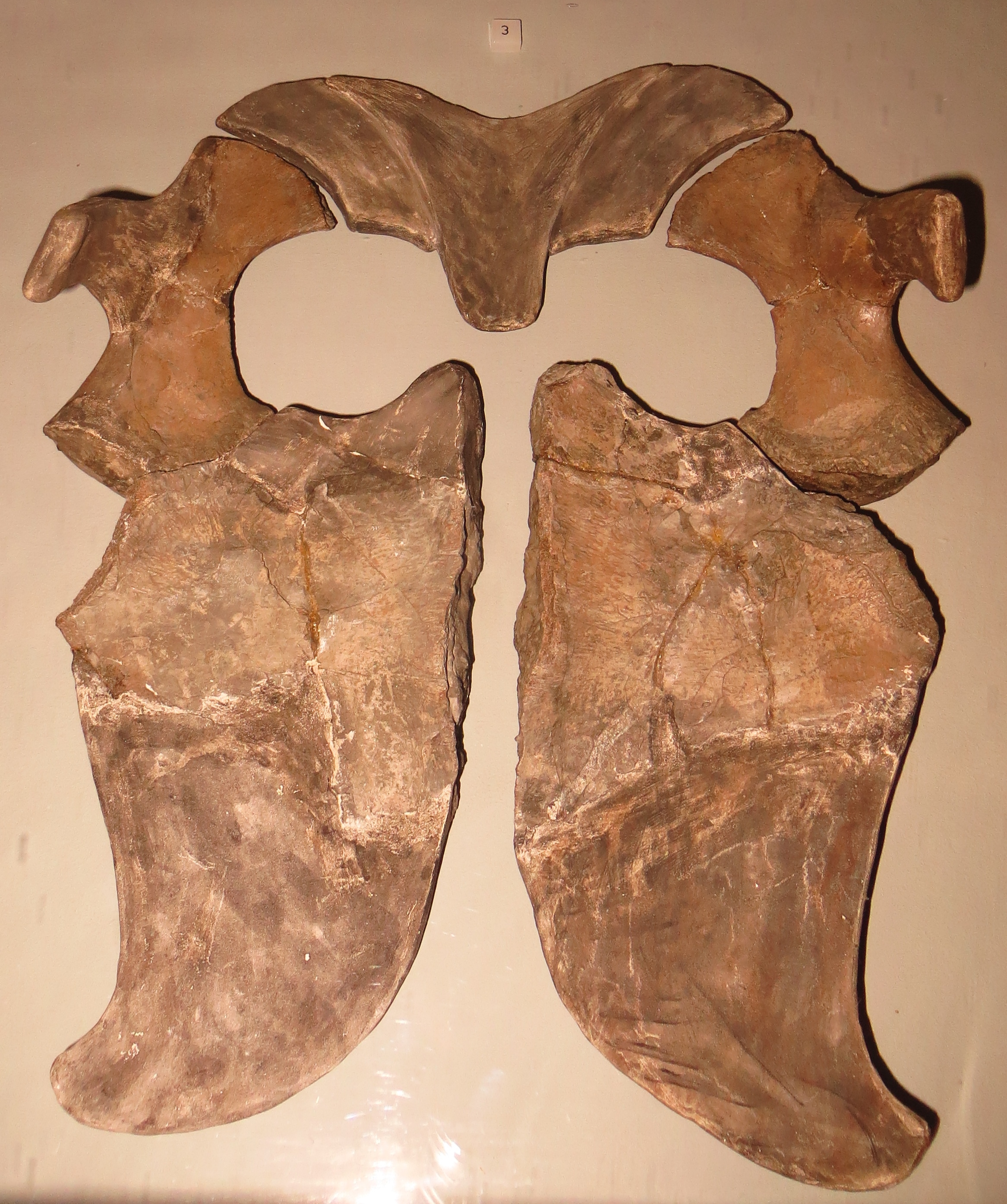
- Pectoral girdle of Sthenarosaurus .sp.

Scientific classification
- Domain: Eukaryota
- Kingdom: Animalia
- Phylum: Chordata
- Class: Reptilia
- Superorder: †Sauropterygia
- Order: †Plesiosauria
- Family: †Rhomaleosauridae
- Genus: †Sthenarosaurus; Watson, 1909
- Species: †S. dawkinsi

Binomial name
- †Sthenarosaurus dawkinsi Watson, 1909

= Sthenarosaurus =

Sthenarosaurus Temporal range: Early Jurassic 183–176 Ma

Extinct genus of reptiles

Sthenarosaurus (meaning "strong lizard") is an extinct genus of rhomaleosaurid pliosauroid discovered in the Toarcian-aged 'Main Alum Shale' (Commune subzone of Bifrons zone) in Whitby, England. The type species, Sthenarosaurus dawkinsi, was named and described in 1909 by D. M. S. Watson. The type specimen is MMUM LL 8023, a set of postcrania discovered in Whitby. Other indeterminate specimens are known, including a pectoral girdle (pictured in taxobox) described in 1911. Plesiosaurian fossils were acquired for the Manchester Museum by William Boyd Dawkins who is honoured by the specific name.

== Description ==
The holotype is known from an incomplete skeleton with no skull. A precise reconstruction is not possible, but it is assumed that Sthenarosaurus was a small plesiosaur, reaching up to 3 metres (9.8 ft) long when fully grown. The coracoids were short and thick, while the pelvis was broad and strong. The dorsal vertebrae possessed short, but very broad and high vertebral centers, with thick neural spines. Eighteen cervical vertebrae are preserved, and vary greatly in size: the largest is almost double the smallest; this suggests that if the entire neck had been made up of even a few more vertebrae than those preserved, the animal would have had a strange appearance, due to noticeable thinning of the neck in the head area.

== Classification ==
Sthenarosaurus has been placed in the Pliosauroidea within Plesiosauria since it was described in 1909. It was the sister taxon to Archaeonectrus (known at the time as "Plesiosaurus" rostratus), based on similarities in the shape of the shoulder blades, coracoids and cervical vertebrae. Compared to Archaeonectrus however, the cervicals of Sthenarosaurus were longer. It is possible that Sthenarosaurus represents a currently unknown clade of plesiosaurs.

== See also ==
- List of plesiosaur genera
- Timeline of plesiosaur research
