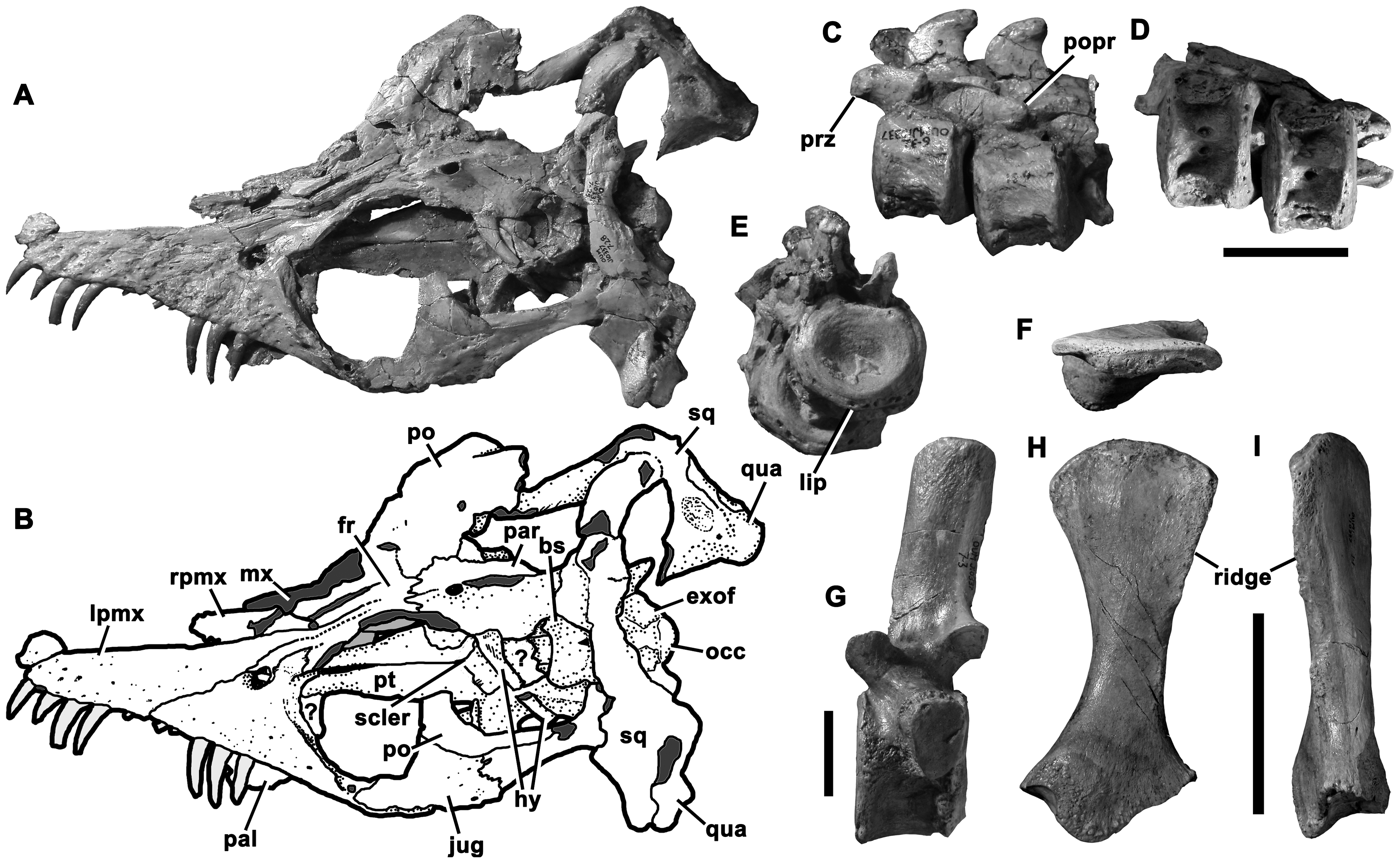
- Holotype of Stratesaurus taylori

Scientific classification
- Kingdom: Animalia
- Phylum: Chordata
- Class: Reptilia
- Superorder: †Sauropterygia
- Order: †Plesiosauria
- Family: †Rhomaleosauridae
- Genus: †Stratesaurus; Benson, Evans & Druckenmiller, 2012

Type species
- †Stratesaurus taylori Benson, Evans & Druckenmiller, 2012

= Stratesaurus =

Stratesaurus Temporal range: Early Jurassic, 199.6–198 Ma

Extinct genus of reptiles

Stratesaurus is an extinct genus of small-bodied basal plesiosaur known from the Early Jurassic period (most likely earliest Hettangian stage) of the United Kingdom. It contains a single species, S. taylori. It was a small plesiosaur, with a skull length of 18 cm (7.1 in) and a body length of 2 m (6.6 ft).

== Discovery ==
Stratesaurus is known from the holotype specimen OUMNH J.10337, a dorsoventrally crushed but nearly complete skull, and three-dimensionally preserved partial postcranial skeleton including anterior cervical and pectoral vertebrae, a partial hindlimb and ilium. The specimen was acquired by the OUMNH in 1874 from the collection of Thomas Hawkins. GSM 26035 was referred to S. taylori because it shares one autapomorphy and other characters with the holotype specimen. It consists of a skull and some anterior cervical vertebrae. AGT 11 was also referred to S. taylori. Although it does nor show the autapomorphies of S. taylori, it is indistinguishable from both OUMNH J.10337 and GSM 26035, and it is possible to distinguish it from similar taxa, like Avalonnectes. All specimens were collected at Street, of Somerset, from the Pre-Planorbis beds of the Blue Lias Formation of the Lower Lias Group. These beds likely occur below the first occurrence of the ammonite Psiloceras planorbis. Thus, they probably fall within the earliest Hettangian P. tilmanni Chronozone, which is about 199.6-198 million years old, immediately following the Triassic–Jurassic Boundary. Plesiosaurs fossils which were discovered at Street represent the earliest known occurrence of the Plesiosauria. Hence, Stratesaurus is one of the oldest plesiosaurs to date.

== Description ==
Stratesaurus is a small-bodied plesiosaur, with a skull length of 180 mm (7.1 in) in the holotype. Its snout is not constricted, and it has five of tooth sockets in its premaxilla and sixteen in the maxilla. In the front part of the neck, there are strongly developed backwards-pointing projections on the prezygapophyses, an autapomorphy (unique derived feature) of the genus. Also autapomorphic are the short lengths of the centra (vertebral bodies) in the shoulder region.

== Phylogeny ==
A phylogenetic analysis performed by Benson et al. (2012) found it to be the basalmost rhomaleosaurid. The cladogram below shows Stratesaurus phylogenetic position among other plesiosaurs following Benson et al. (2012).

- Plesiosauria
  - Neoplesiosauria
    - Pliosauridae
    - Plesiosauroidea
  - Rhomaleosauridae
    - Stratesaurus taylori
    - - Macroplata tenuiceps
      - - Avalonnectes arturi
        - - Eurycleidus arcuatus
          - - Meyerasaurus victor
            - - Maresaurus coccai
              - - Atychodracon megacephalus
                - - Archaeonectrus rostratus
                  - - Rhomaleosaurus cramptoni
                    - - Rhomaleosaurus thorntoni
                      - Rhomaleosaurus zetlandicus

== Etymology ==
Stratesaurus was first described and named by Roger B. J. Benson, Mark Evans and Patrick S. Druckenmiller in 2012 and the type species is Stratesaurus taylori. The generic name is derived from "Strate", the name for Street as it recorded in the Domesday Book and from Greek sauros, meaning "lizard". The specific name honors the paleontologist Michael A. Taylor, who performed acid preparation of the holotype.

== See also ==
- List of plesiosaur genera
- Timeline of plesiosaur research
