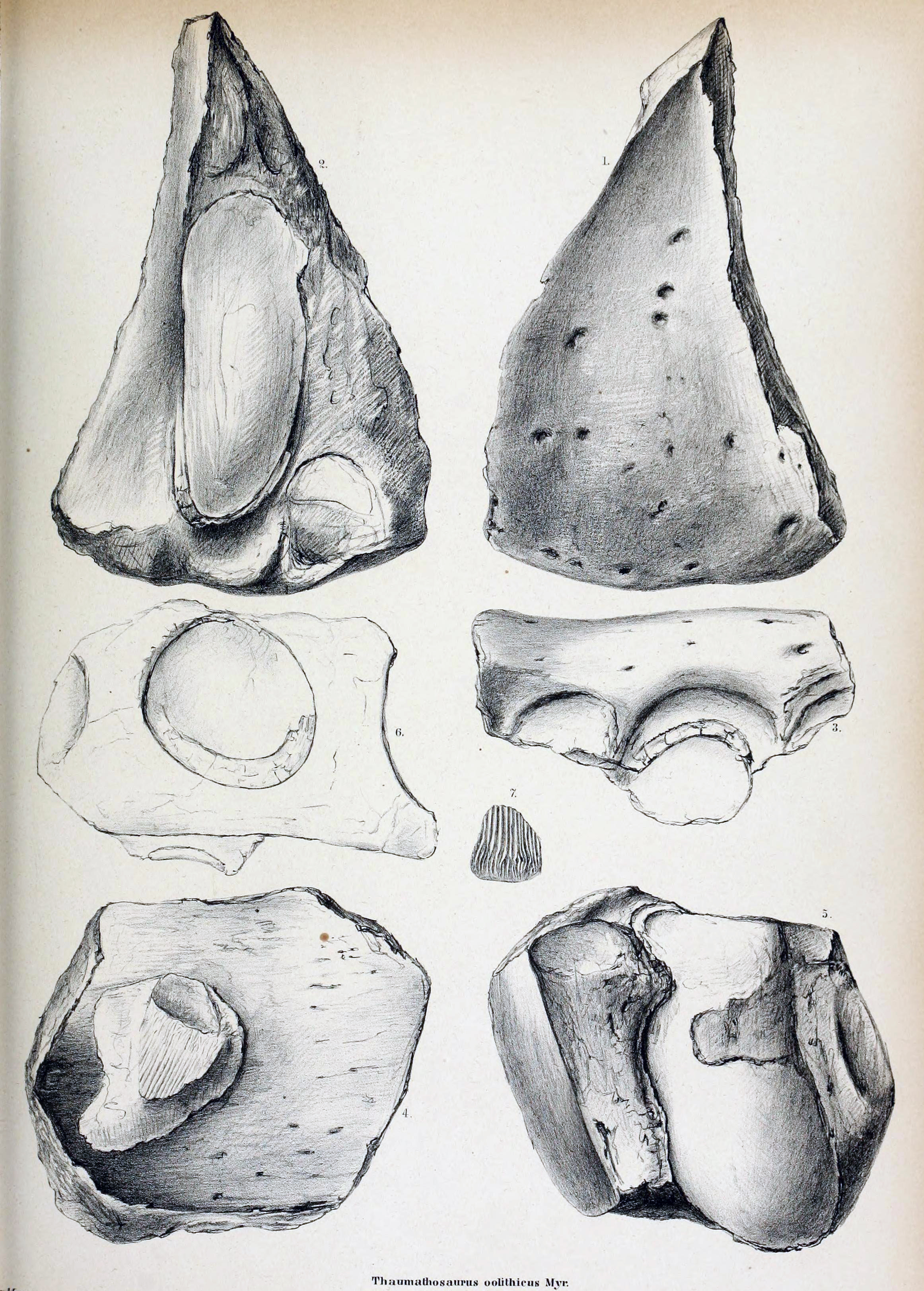
- Jaw fragments

Scientific classification
- Kingdom: Animalia
- Phylum: Chordata
- Class: Reptilia
- Superorder: †Sauropterygia
- Genus: †Thaumatosaurus

= Thaumatosaurus =

Thaumatosaurus (Meaning 'wonder reptile') is a dubious extinct genus of plesiosaur.

== History ==
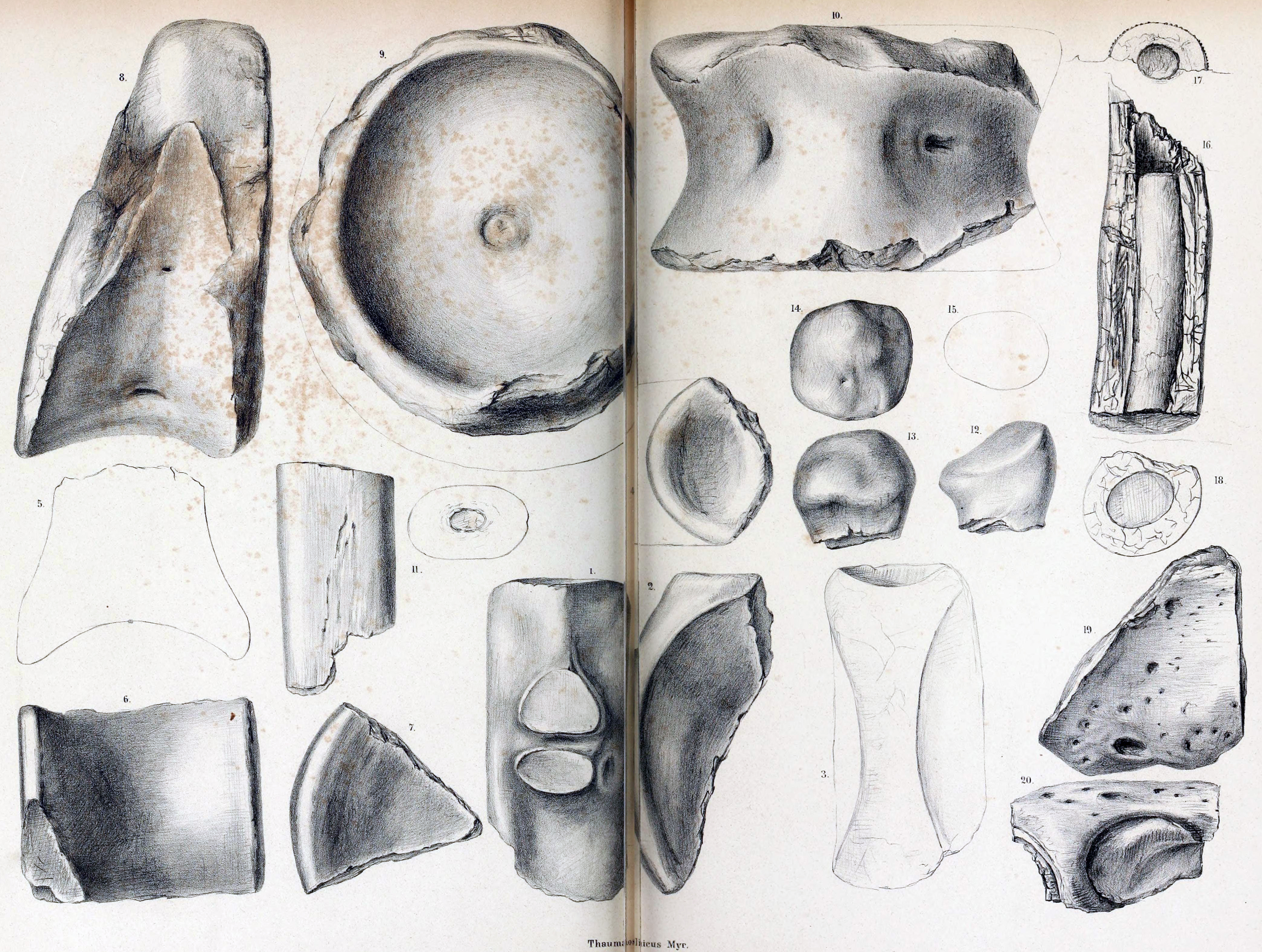
Various elements

The name Thaumatosaurus, which means 'wonder reptile', belonged to a genus of plesiosaur that was described by palaeontologist Christian Erich Hermann von Meyer, back in 1841. Meyer described the species Thaumatosaurus oolithicus based on partial skull, vertebral and limb remains, that were found in the Posidonia Shale of Holzmaden, Baden-Württemberg, Germany. In 1856, Meyer published a full description of Thaumatosaurus and later provided figures of the specimen. Richard Lydekker (1889) regarded Rhomaleosaurus as a synonym of Thaumatosaurus because Richard Lydekker and Harry G. Seeley "refused steadfastly to recognize the generic and specific names proposed by one another". Lydekker referred continuously to the name Thaumatosaurus, instead of Rhomaleosaurus. Fraas (1910) recognized both generic names in his original description of R. victor (now Meyerasaurus), but referring to the new species "Thaumatosaurus" victor. Many other researchers adopted the name "Thaumatosaurus". Today this taxon is regarded as a nomen dubium because the holotype can be referred to Pliosauroidea indet at best. The diagnostic specimens which previously were regarded as Thaumatosaurus's specimens, now represent the holotypes of Eurycleidus, Meyerasaurus and Rhomaleosaurus.

== See also ==
- List of plesiosaurs
