= Hiccles Cove Formation =

Geologic formation in Canada

- Type: Geological formation

Location
- Region: Northwest Territories and Nunavut
- Country: Canada
- Extent: Melville Island

The Hiccles Cove Formation is a Mesozoic geologic formation in Canada. Plesiosaur remains are among the fossils that have been recovered from its strata.

== See also ==
- Plesiosaur stratigraphic distribution
