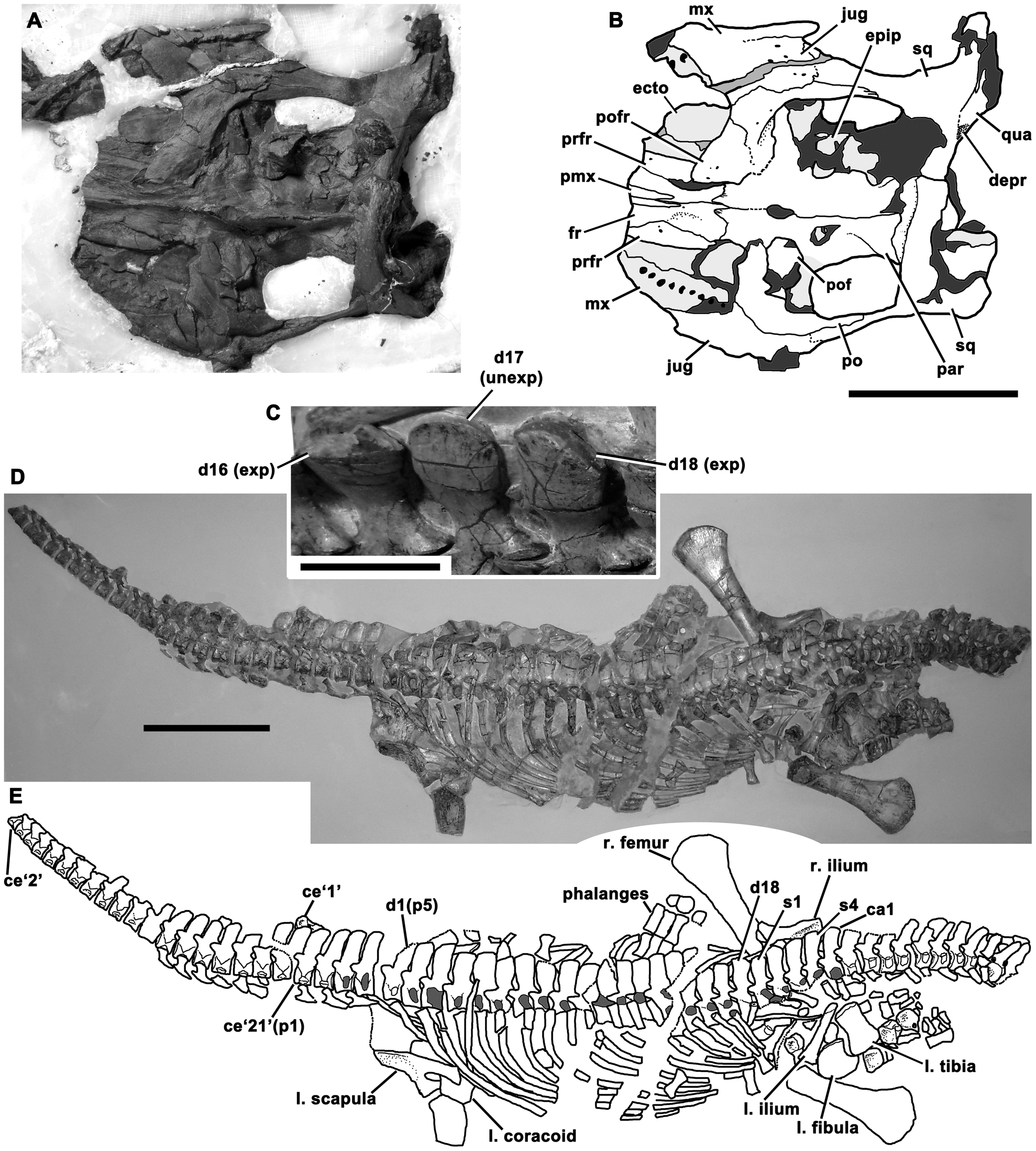
- Holotype of Avalonnectes arturi

Scientific classification
- Kingdom: Animalia
- Phylum: Chordata
- Class: Reptilia
- Superorder: †Sauropterygia
- Order: †Plesiosauria
- Family: †Rhomaleosauridae
- Genus: †Avalonnectes; Benson, Evans & Druckenmiller, 2012

Type species
- †Avalonnectes arturi Benson, Evans & Druckenmiller, 2012

= Avalonnectes =

Avalonnectes Temporal range: Early Jurassic, 199.6–198 Ma

Extinct genus of reptiles

Avalonnectes is an extinct genus of small-bodied rhomaleosaurid known from the Early Jurassic period (most likely earliest Hettangian stage) of the United Kingdom. It contains a single species, A. arturi.

== Discovery ==
Avalonnectes is known from the holotype specimen NHMUK 14550, which consists of the posterior portion of a skull, and a nearly complete, three-dimensionally preserved and articulated postcranial skeleton. Another partial postcranial skeleton which was referred to it is AGT uncatalogued. Both specimens were collected at Street, of Somerset, from the Pre-Planorbis beds of the Blue Lias Formation of the Lower Lias Group. These beds likely occur below the first occurrence of the ammonite Psiloceras planorbis. Thus, they probably fall within the earliest Hettangian P. tilmanni Chronozone, which is about 199.6-198 million years old, immediately following the Triassic–Jurassic Boundary. Plesiosaurs fossils which were discovered at Street represent the earliest known occurrence of the Plesiosauria. Hence, Avalonnectes is one of the oldest plesiosaurs to date.

== Description ==
Avalonnectes is a small-bodied rhomaleosaurid, with a trunck length of 73.5 cm (2 ft 4.9 in) and a neck length of more than 67 cm (2 ft 2 in). The number of dorsal vertebrae are about 18–19; this low number represents its autapomorphy.

== Classification ==
A phylogenetic analysis performed by Benson et al. (2012) found it to be a basal rhomaleosaurid. The cladogram below shows Avalonnectes phylogenetic position among other plesiosaurs following Benson et al. (2012).

- Plesiosauria
  - Neoplesiosauria
    - Pliosauridae
    - Plesiosauroidea
  - Rhomaleosauridae
    - Stratesaurus taylori
    - - Macroplata tenuiceps
      - - Avalonnectes arturi
        - - Eurycleidus arcuatus
          - - Meyerasaurus victor
            - - Maresaurus coccai
              - - Atychodracon megacephalus
                - - Archaeonectrus rostratus
                  - - Rhomaleosaurus cramptoni
                    - - Rhomaleosaurus thorntoni
                      - Rhomaleosaurus zetlandicus

== Etymology ==
Avalonnectes was first described and named by Roger B. J. Benson, Mark Evans and Patrick S. Druckenmiller in 2012 and the type species is Avalonnectes arturi. The generic name is derived from Avalon, an island from the legend of King Arthur, often identified with Glastonbury, near Street, and from Greek nectes, meaning "swimmer". The specific name honors the paleontologist Arthur Cruickshank (1932–2011), who with M. A. Taylor initiated the restudy of British Lower Jurassic plesiosaurians in the 1990s. It is also a reference to the legendary King Arthur of British folklore.

== See also ==
- Timeline of plesiosaur research
- List of plesiosaur genera
