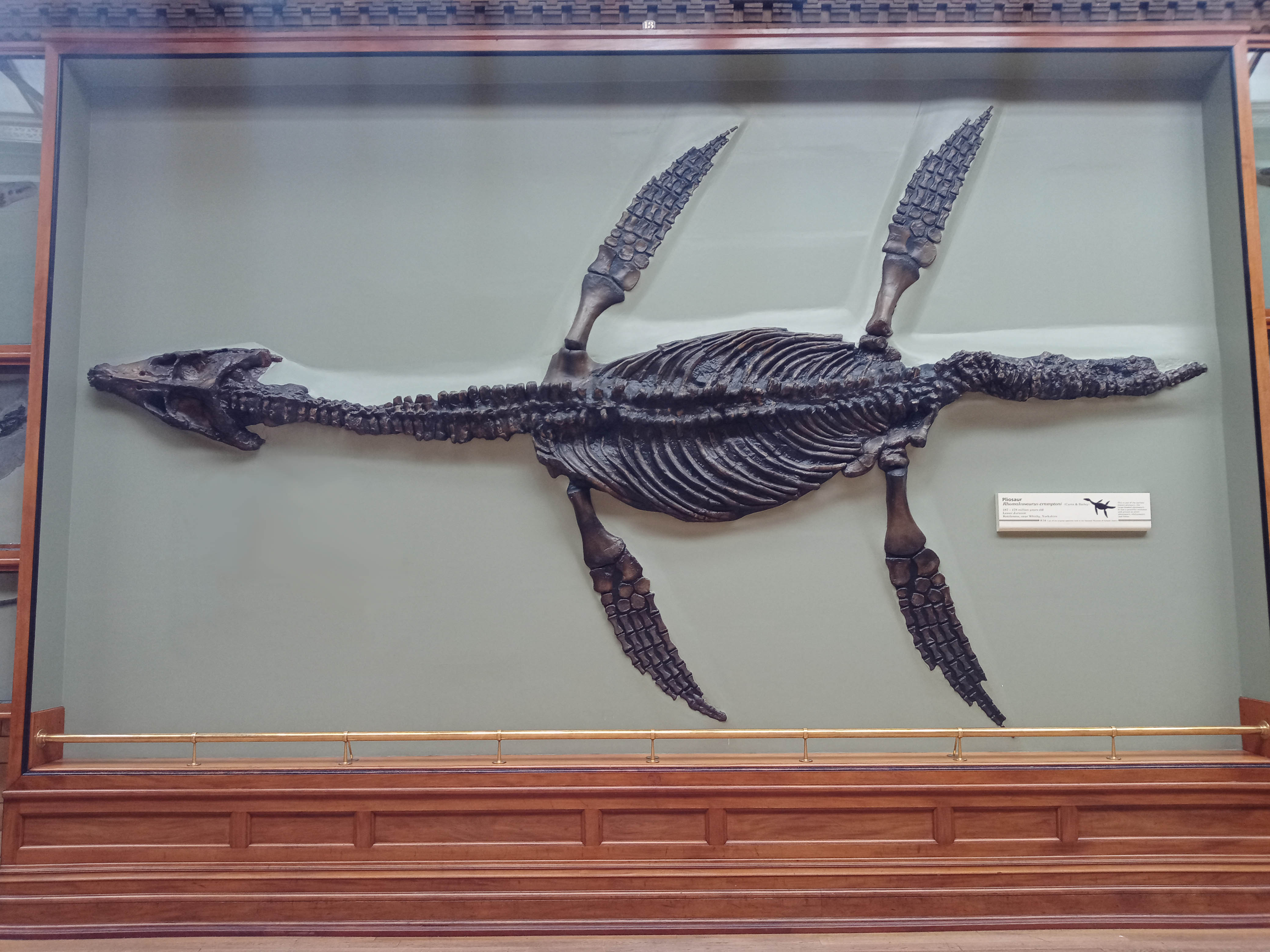
- Rhomaleosaurus cramptoni (NHMUK PV R 34), Natural History Museum

Scientific classification
- Kingdom: Animalia
- Phylum: Chordata
- Class: Reptilia
- Superorder: †Sauropterygia
- Order: †Plesiosauria
- Family: †Rhomaleosauridae; Kuhn, 1961

Genera
- †Anningasaura?; †Archaeonectrus; †Atychodracon; †Avalonnectes; †Bishanopliosaurus?; †Borealonectes; †Eurycleidus; †Lindwurmia?; †Macroplata; †Maresaurus; †Meyerasaurus; †Rhomaleosaurus; †Sthenarosaurus; †Stratesaurus?; †Thaumatodracon; †Trematospondylus?; †Yuzhoupliosaurus?

= Rhomaleosauridae =

Rhomaleosaurids Temporal range: 201–161 Ma

Extinct family of reptiles

Rhomaleosauridae is a family of plesiosaurs from the Earliest Jurassic to the latest Middle Jurassic (Hettangian to Callovian stages) of Europe, North America, South America and possibly Asia. Most rhomaleosaurids are known from England, many specifically from lower Blue Lias deposits that date back to the earliest Jurassic, just at the boundary with the Triassic. In fact, to date only two undisputed rhomaleosaurids were named from outside Europe - the closely related Borealonectes russelli and Maresaurus coccai from Canada and Argentina, respectively. These two species are also the only Middle Jurassic representatives of the family. Rhomaleosauridae was formally named by Kuhn in 1961, originally proposed to include Rhomaleosaurus cramptoni and its relatives, which have short necks and large heads relatively to plesiosauroids like Elasmosaurus and Plesiosaurus, but longer necks and smaller heads relatively to advanced pliosaurids like Pliosaurus and Kronosaurus.

== Phylogeny ==
Rhomaleosauridae is a stem-based taxon defined in 2010 (and in earlier studies in a similar manner) as "all taxa more closely related to Meyerasaurus victor than to Leptocleidus superstes, Pliosaurus brachydeirus or Polycotylus latipinnis". Modern cladistic analyses are divided in the position of Rhomaleosauridae; some recover it at the base of Plesiosauria in a position basal to Neoplesiosauria that contains both the pliosauroids and the plesiosauroids, while other analyses recover Rhomaleosauridae as pliosauroids, to the exclusion of Plesiosauroidea, either as the sister taxon of Pliosauridae or, rarely, as a paraphyletic array of taxa leading to it. Additionally, many putative rhomaleosaurids from the early deposits of Blue Lias, vary greatly in their position across various phylogenetic analyses. Some of these are recovered as basal rhomaleosaurids in certain analyses, or alternatively outside Rhomaleosauridae in more basal positions within Plesiosauria. The following two cladograms are simplified after two recent analyses, showing only the relationships within Rhomaleosauridae, and some other relevant basal taxa whose position within the family is highly uncertain.

Following Benson et al. (2012):

- Plesiosauria
  - Bobosaurus forojuliensis
  - - Anningasaura lymense
    - - Neoplesiosauria
        - Pliosauridae
        - Plesiosauroidea
      - Rhomaleosauridae
        - Stratesaurus taylori
        - - Macroplata tenuiceps
          - - Avalonnectes arturi
            - - Eurycleidus arcuatus
              - - Meyerasaurus victor
                - - Maresaurus coccai
                  - - Atychodracon megacephalus
                    - - Archaeonectrus rostratus
                      - - Rhomaleosaurus cramptoni
                        - - Rhomaleosaurus thorntoni
                          - Rhomaleosaurus zetlandicus

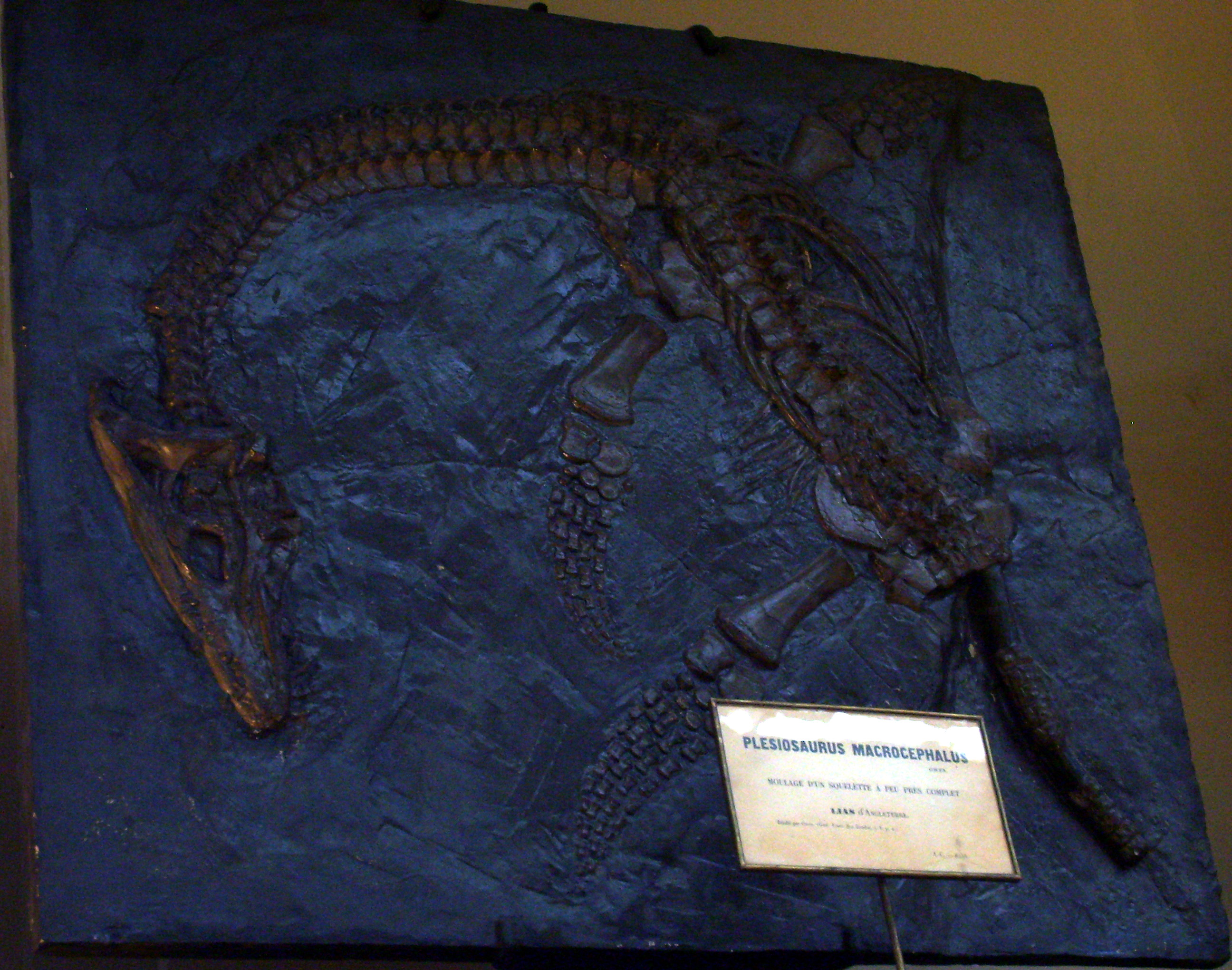
Cast of Plesiosaurus macrocephalus, a possible rhomaleosaurid, and perhaps a juvenile of Thaumatodracon

Following Benson & Druckenmiller (2014), with Macroplata and Eurycleidus excluded, and Borealonectes added:

- Plesiosauria
  - Bobosaurus forojuliensis
  - - Eoplesiosaurus antiquior
    - Stratesaurus taylori
    - Pliosauridae
    - Plesiosauroidea
    - Rhomaleosauridae
      - Anningasaura lymense
      - Avalonnectes arturi
      - - Atychodracon megacephalus
        - - Archaeonectrus rostratus
          - - Meyerasaurus victor
            - - - Borealonectes russelli
                - Maresaurus coccai
              - - Rhomaleosaurus thorntoni
                - - Rhomaleosaurus cramptoni
                  - Rhomaleosaurus zetlandicus
