= Borealonectes =

Borealonectes Temporal range: Middle Jurassic 165–161 Ma

Scientific classification
- Domain: Eukaryota
- Kingdom: Animalia
- Phylum: Chordata
- Class: Reptilia
- Superorder: †Sauropterygia
- Order: †Plesiosauria
- Family: †Rhomaleosauridae
- Genus: †Borealonectes; Sato and Wu, 2008

Species
- †Borealonectes russelli Sato and Wu, 2008 (type)

Extinct genus of reptiles

Borealonectes is a genus of rhomaleosaurid pliosauroid, a type of plesiosaur. Its fossils were found in the Callovian-age (Middle Jurassic, about 165-161 million years ago) Hiccles Cove Formation of Melville Island, Canada, one of the islands in the Canadian Arctic Archipelago. It is based on a skull, neck vertebrae, and the right forelimb of one individual. Named in 2008 by Sato and Wu, Borealonectes is one of the few plesiosaurs known from the Jurassic of North America, and the first marine reptile from the Canadian Arctic with a well-preserved skull. The type species is B. russelli.

== See also ==
- Timeline of plesiosaur research
- List of plesiosaur genera
