= Eurycleidus =

Eurycleidus Temporal range: Early Jurassic, 199.6–198 Ma

Scientific classification
- Kingdom: Animalia
- Phylum: Chordata
- Class: Reptilia
- Superorder: †Sauropterygia
- Order: †Plesiosauria
- Family: †Rhomaleosauridae
- Genus: †Eurycleidus; Andrews, 1922

Type species
- †Eurycleidus arcuatus (Owen, 1840)

Synonyms
- Plesiosaurus arcuatus Owen, 1840 (type)

Extinct genus of reptiles

Eurycleidus is an extinct genus of large-bodied rhomaleosaurid known from the Early Jurassic period (most likely earliest Hettangian stage) of the United Kingdom. It contains a single species, E. arcuatus.

== Discovery and naming ==
The currently accepted remains that belong to Eurycleidus arctuatus consist of syntypes BMNH 2027, 2028, 2029, 2030, and associated specimens BMNH R.1317 en R.1318, BMNH 2047, BMNH 2061 and BMNH R.1319. They were acquired by Thomas Hawkins during the early 1830s from a quarry in Street, Somerset and he described them in 1834.

In 1837, Richard Owen erroneously believed the remains had been found in Lyme Regis, and in 1840 he assigned them to Plesiosaurus under the newly created species P. arcuatus.

In 1889 Richard Lydekker moved the species to the genus Thaumatosaurus as T. arcuatus. Lydekker stated that specimen BMNH 2030, a symphysis of the lower jaws, was the holotype, although it can at most be a lectotype. He believed that the other pieces belonged to the same individual, indicating that they could have been obtained from a continuous piece of rock and that there is no overlap in the elements (BMNH R2029 is a left coracoid, BMNH R2027 is a left femur and a vertebra, BMNH R1322 are the clavicles and the interclavicle and skull material was completely unknown at the time).

In 1922, after the pectoral girdle had been re-prepared and exposed, Charles William Andrews named the genus Eurycleidus for Plesiosaurus arcuatus.

In 1932, Thaumatosaurus victor was renamed to Eurycleidus victor by Karl von Zittel; it was moved to its own genus Meyerasaurus in 2010.

In 1994, the fairly complete skeleton OUM J.28585 was assigned to E. arcuatus. It was later moved to Atychodracon.

A second species, E. megacephalus (Stutchbury, 1846 [originally Rhomaleosaurus megacephalus]), was reassigned to this genus by Smith (2007). However, most analyses find E. megacephalus to represent an unnamed genus, which is distinct from both Eurycleidus and Rhomaleosaurus. E. megacephalus was moved to its own genus Atychodracon by Adam Smith in 2015.

A specimen discovered in 1899 in Halberstadt, Germany that was assigned to Eurycleidus arcuatus was moved to its own genus Lindwurmia in 2019.

== Description ==
Like other plesiosaurs, Eurycleidus probably lived on a diet of fish, using its sharp needle-like teeth to catch prey. Its shoulder bones were fairly large, indicating a powerful forward stroke for fast swimming.

== Phylogeny ==
Most phylogenetic analyses find the type species of the genus, Plesiosaurus arcuatus Owen 1840, with as combinatio nova Eurycleidus arcuatus Andrews 1922, to be a relatively basal rhomaleosaurid.

The cladogram below shows E. arcuatus phylogenetic position among other plesiosaurs following Benson et al. (2012).

- Plesiosauria
  - Neoplesiosauria
    - Pliosauridae
    - Plesiosauroidea
  - Rhomaleosauridae
    - Stratesaurus taylori
    - - Macroplata tenuiceps
      - - Avalonnectes arturi
        - - Eurycleidus arcuatus
          - - Meyerasaurus victor
            - - Maresaurus coccai
              - - Atychodracon megacephalus
                - - Archaeonectrus rostratus
                  - - Rhomaleosaurus cramptoni
                    - - Rhomaleosaurus thorntoni
                      - Rhomaleosaurus zetlandicus

== See also ==
- Timeline of plesiosaur research
- List of plesiosaurs
