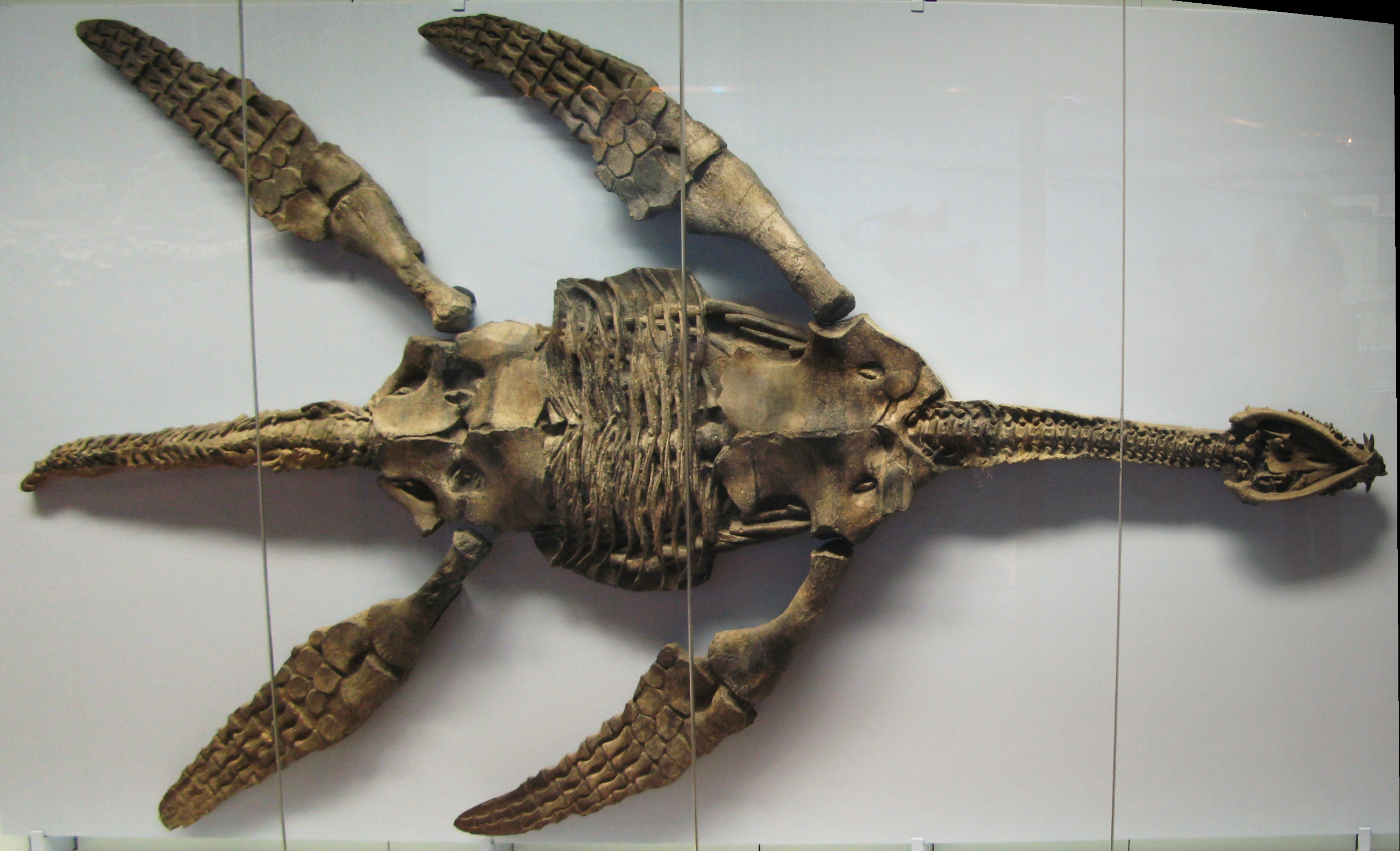
- The holotype in the State Museum of Natural History Stuttgart

Scientific classification
- Kingdom: Animalia
- Phylum: Chordata
- Class: Reptilia
- Superorder: †Sauropterygia
- Order: †Plesiosauria
- Family: †Rhomaleosauridae
- Genus: †Meyerasaurus; Smith & Vincent, 2010
- Species: †M. victor

Binomial name
- †Meyerasaurus victor (Fraas, 1910 [originally Thaumatosaurus])

Synonyms
- Thaumatosaurus victor Fraas, 1910, type; Plesiosaurus (Thaumatosaurus) victor Fraas, 1910; Eurycleidus victor in Zittel, 1932; Rhomaleosaurus victor Tarlo, 1960

= Meyerasaurus =

Meyerasaurus Temporal range: Early Jurassic, 183–180 Ma

Extinct genus of reptiles

Meyerasaurus is an extinct genus of rhomaleosaurid plesiosaur known from the Early Jurassic of Holzmaden, Baden-Württemberg in southwestern Germany.

== Discovery ==
Between Holzmaden and Zell unter Aichelberg, a chalkstone and shale quarry was operated. It intersected an extremely hard forty centimetres thick layer of Stinkstein chalk, which was deemed worthless. Even ichthyosaur "mummies" present in the layer were discarded as it was not cost-effective to prepare them. The rocks were dumped in a ravine. In May 1906, the famous fossil trader Bernhard Hauff discovered in the dump broken-up boulders containing an uniquely complete and thus very rare plesiosaur skeleton. Up till that time, German plesiosaurs finds had tended to be much more fragmentary than British discoveries. Over nine months he recovered 2.5 tonnes of chalkstone, exposing and preparing the bones. Together with a second plesiosaurian skeleton, discovered nearby in shale in November 1906, much later referred to Seeleyosaurus, it was offered for sale. Financial support by D. Landauer and Victor Fraas allowed the Stuttgarter Königliche Naturalienkabinett to obtain both specimens.

== Naming ==
In 1910 Eberhard Fraas, the paleontology curator of the Stuttgart institution, named the specimen as Thaumatosaurus victor. This name was mentioned on page 106 of the describing article. The heading of the description section on page 124 reads "Plesiosaurus (Thaumatosaurus) victor n. sp." which has been interpreted as his naming a Plesiosaurus victor coinciding with an immediate renaming into a Thaumatosaurus victor. Fraas, after explaining that he preferred Thaumatosaurus ("wonder reptile") Meyer over Rhomaleosaurus Seeley, states "I name our new species Thaumatosaurus victor". The specific name victor, "winner" in Latin, refers to the specimen being a "magnificent and all previous discoveries in beauty exceeding find" but also explicitly honours E. Fraas's brother Victor Fraas.

Already by 1922, it was recognised that the type material of Thaumatosaurus oolithicus was very poor. In 1932, T. victor was renamed as a species of Eurycleidus and in 1960 by Lambert Beverly Tarlo as Rhomaleosaurus victor. However, these names were rarely used. In 2007, Adam Stuart Smith announced that he would shortly name a separate genus for the taxon as Thaumatosaurus was basically a nomen dubium.

Meyerasaurus was first named by Adam S. Smith and Peggy Vincent in 2010 and the combinatio nova is Meyerasaurus victor. The generic name honors the German palaeontologist Hermann von Meyer for proposing the generic name Thaumatosaurus.

== Description ==
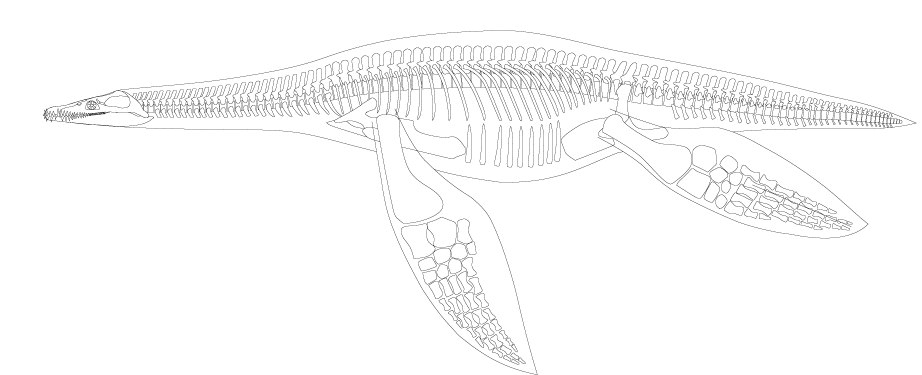
Skeletal diagram

Meyerasaurus is known from the holotype SMNS 12478, an articulated and complete skeleton which preserves the skull, exposed in ventral view. It has a skull length of 37 centimetres (1 ft 3 in) and a body length of 3.35–3.44 m (11.0–11.3 ft). It was collected from the Harpoceras elegantulum-falciferum ammonoid subzones, Harpoceras falcifer zone, of the famous Posidonien-Schiefer lagerstätte (Posidonia Shale), dating to the early Toarcian stage of the Early Jurassic, about 183-180 million years ago.

In 1944, Stuttgart was repeatedly bombed. On 12 September, British bombers caused a firestorm that burnt the inner city. The museum was destroyed and the holotype smashed to pieces. However, this allowed to painstakingly salvage these from under the rubble and put it together again. It is now displayed in the new paleontology exhibition building, the Museum am Löwentor.

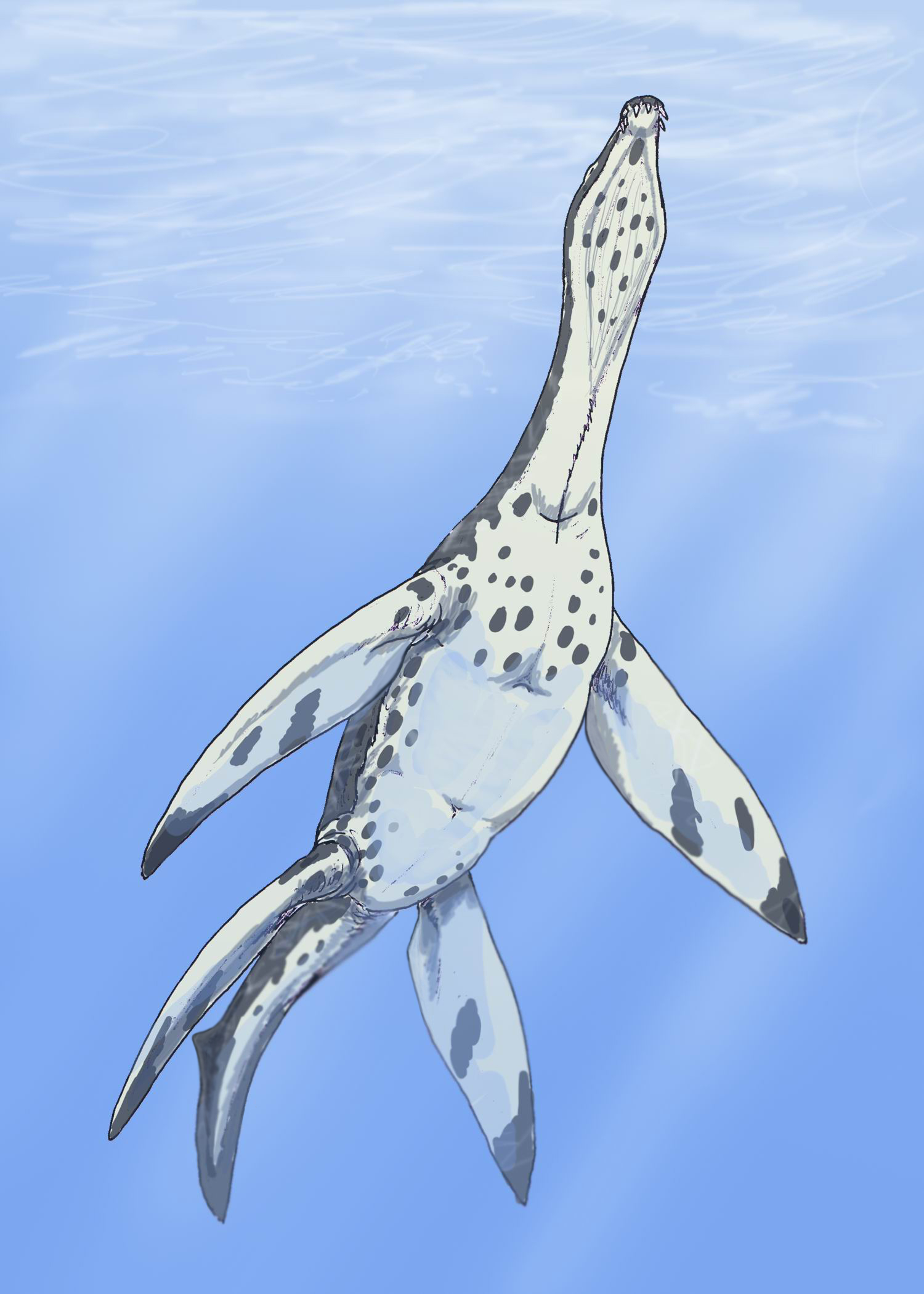
Restoration

== Classification ==
3D animation showing the most likely swimming motions

The cladogram below shows Meyerasaurus phylogenetic position among other plesiosaurs, following Benson et al. (2012).

- Plesiosauria
  - Neoplesiosauria
    - Pliosauridae
    - Plesiosauroidea
  - Rhomaleosauridae
    - Stratesaurus taylori
    - - Macroplata tenuiceps
      - - Avalonnectes arturi
        - - Eurycleidus arcuatus
          - - Meyerasaurus victor
            - - Maresaurus coccai
              - - Atychodracon megacephalus
                - - Archaeonectrus rostratus
                  - - Rhomaleosaurus cramptoni
                    - - Rhomaleosaurus thorntoni
                      - Rhomaleosaurus zetlandicus

== See also ==
- List of plesiosaur genera
- Timeline of plesiosaur research
