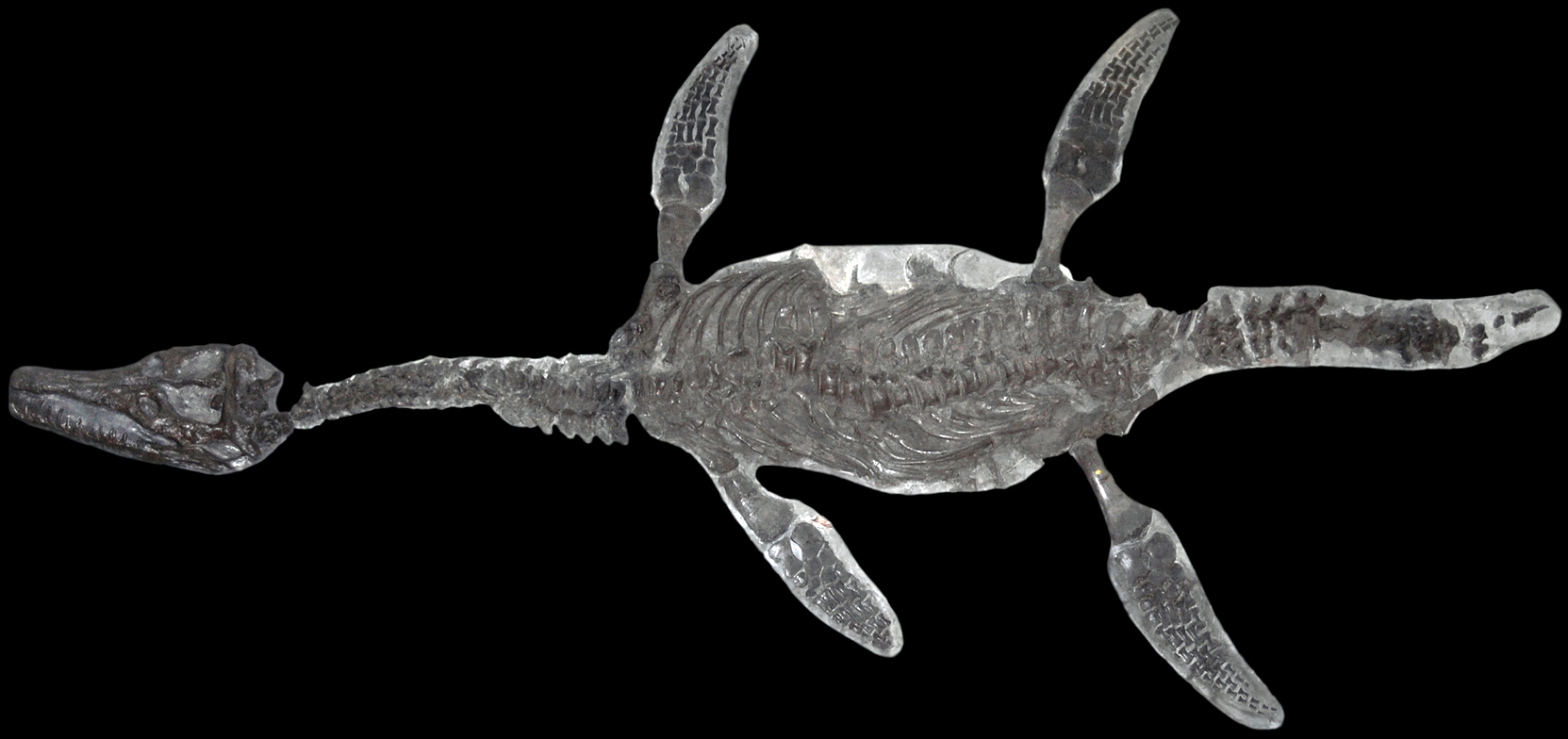
- Holotype specimen NHMUK PV OR 38525

Scientific classification
- Kingdom: Animalia
- Phylum: Chordata
- Class: Reptilia
- Superorder: †Sauropterygia
- Order: †Plesiosauria
- Family: †Rhomaleosauridae
- Genus: †Archaeonectrus; Novozhilov, 1964

Type species
- †Archaeonectrus rostratus Owen, 1865

= Archaeonectrus =

Archaeonectrus Temporal range: Early Jurassic, Sinemurian

Extinct genus of reptiles

Archaeonectrus is an extinct genus of pliosaur from the Early Jurassic (Sinemurian) of what is now southeastern England. The type species is Archaeonectrus (originally "Plesiosaurus") rostratus, first named by Sir Richard Owen in 1865, which was moved to its own genus by N.I. Novozhilov in 1964. It was a relatively small plesiosaur, measuring 3.4–3.67 m (11.2–12.0 ft) long.

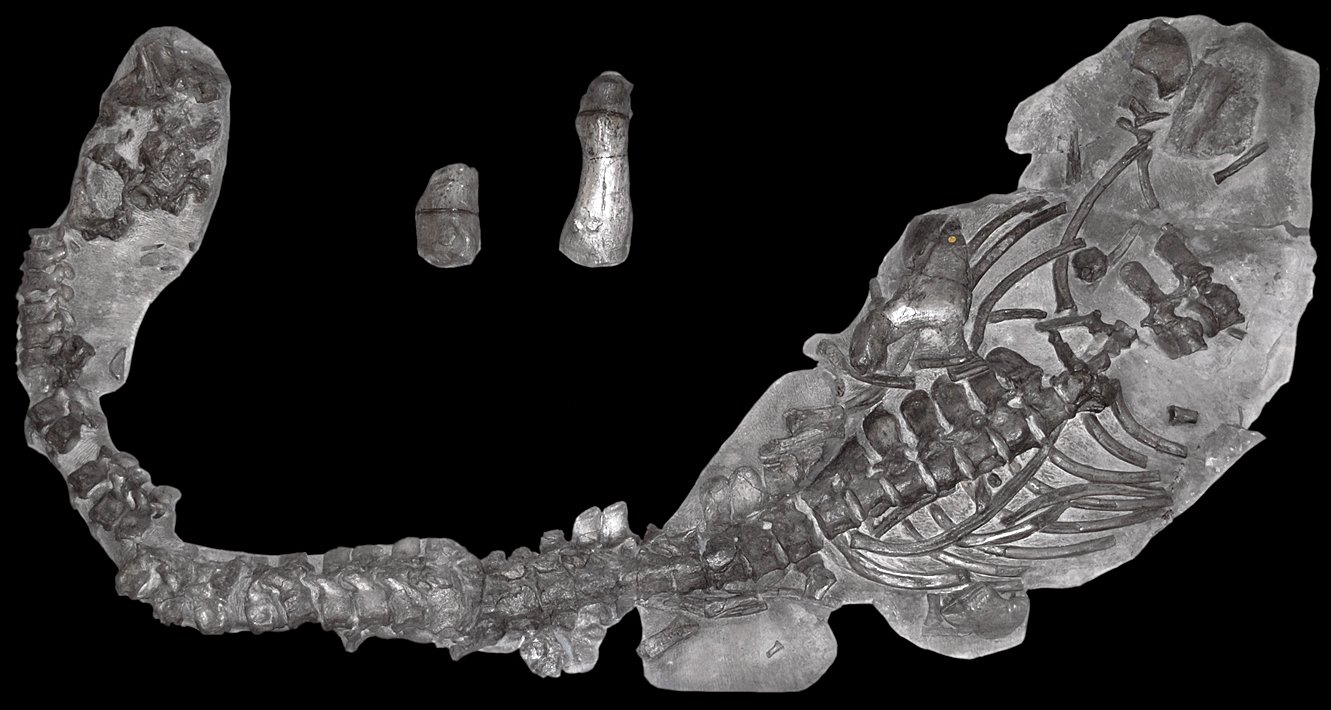
Additional specimen

== Classification ==
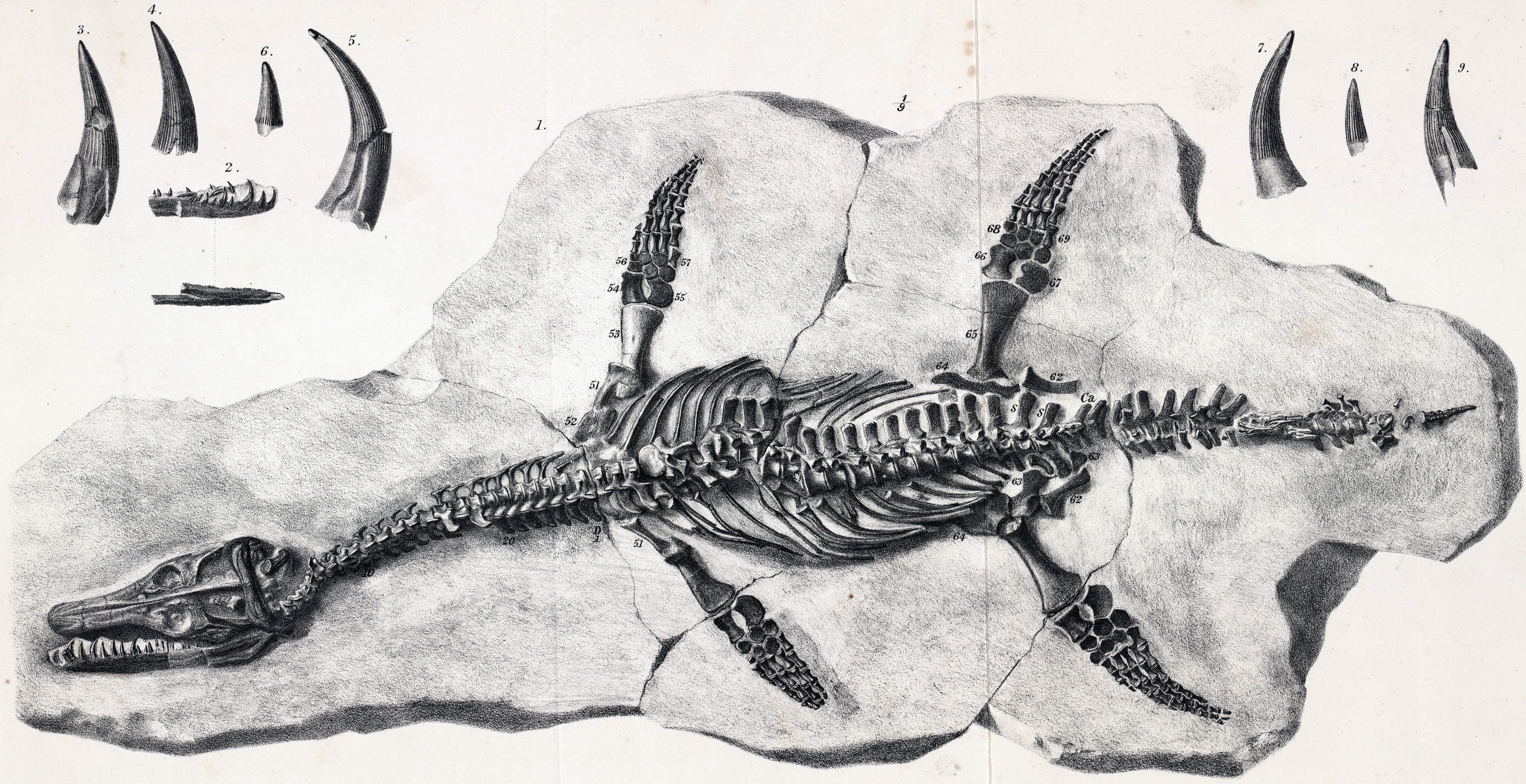
Illustration of the holotype specimen, NHMUK PV OR 38525 (formerly BMNH 38525), dated to c. 1870

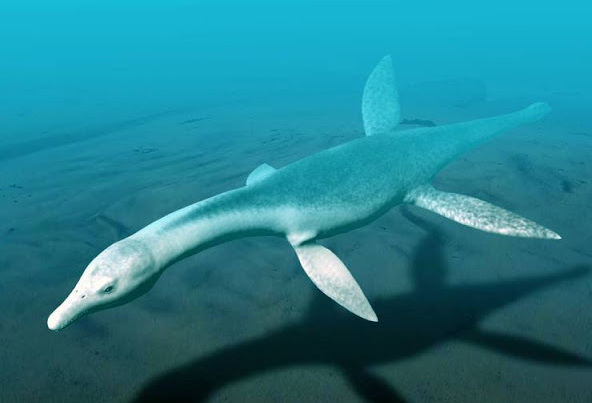
Life restoration

The cladogram below shows Archaeonectrus phylogenetic position among other plesiosaurs, following Benson et al. (2012).

- Plesiosauria
  - Neoplesiosauria
    - Pliosauridae
    - Plesiosauroidea
  - Rhomaleosauridae
    - Stratesaurus taylori
    - - Macroplata tenuiceps
      - - Avalonnectes arturi
        - - Eurycleidus arcuatus
          - - Meyerasaurus victor
            - - Maresaurus coccai
              - - Atychodracon megacephalus
                - - Archaeonectrus rostratus
                  - - Rhomaleosaurus cramptoni
                    - - Rhomaleosaurus thorntoni
                      - Rhomaleosaurus zetlandicus

== See also ==
- Timeline of plesiosaur research
- List of plesiosaur genera
