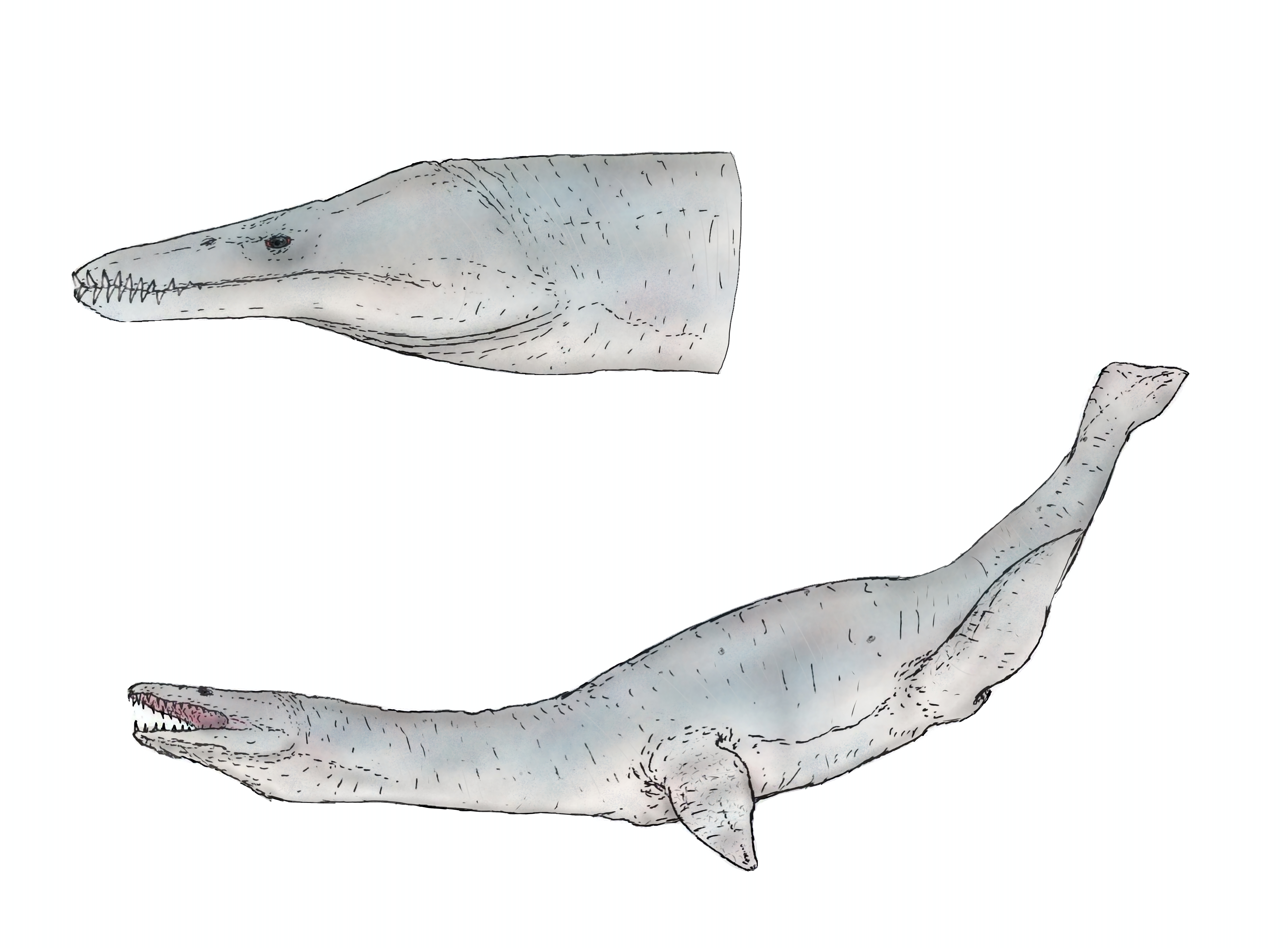

Scientific classification
- Kingdom: Animalia
- Phylum: Chordata
- Class: Reptilia
- Superorder: †Sauropterygia
- Order: †Plesiosauria
- Family: †Rhomaleosauridae
- Genus: †Maresaurus; Gasparini, 1997
- Species: †M. coccai

Binomial name
- †Maresaurus coccai Gasparini, 1997

= Maresaurus =

Maresaurus Temporal range: Bajocian ~171–169 Ma

Extinct genus of reptiles

Maresaurus is an extinct genus of plesiosaur from the Middle Jurassic (Bajocian) Los Molles Formation of Argentina. The type species, Maresaurus coccai, was named by Gasparini in 1997. Recent phylogenetic analysis found Maresaurus to be a rhomaleosaurid.

== See also ==
- List of plesiosaur genera
- Timeline of plesiosaur research
