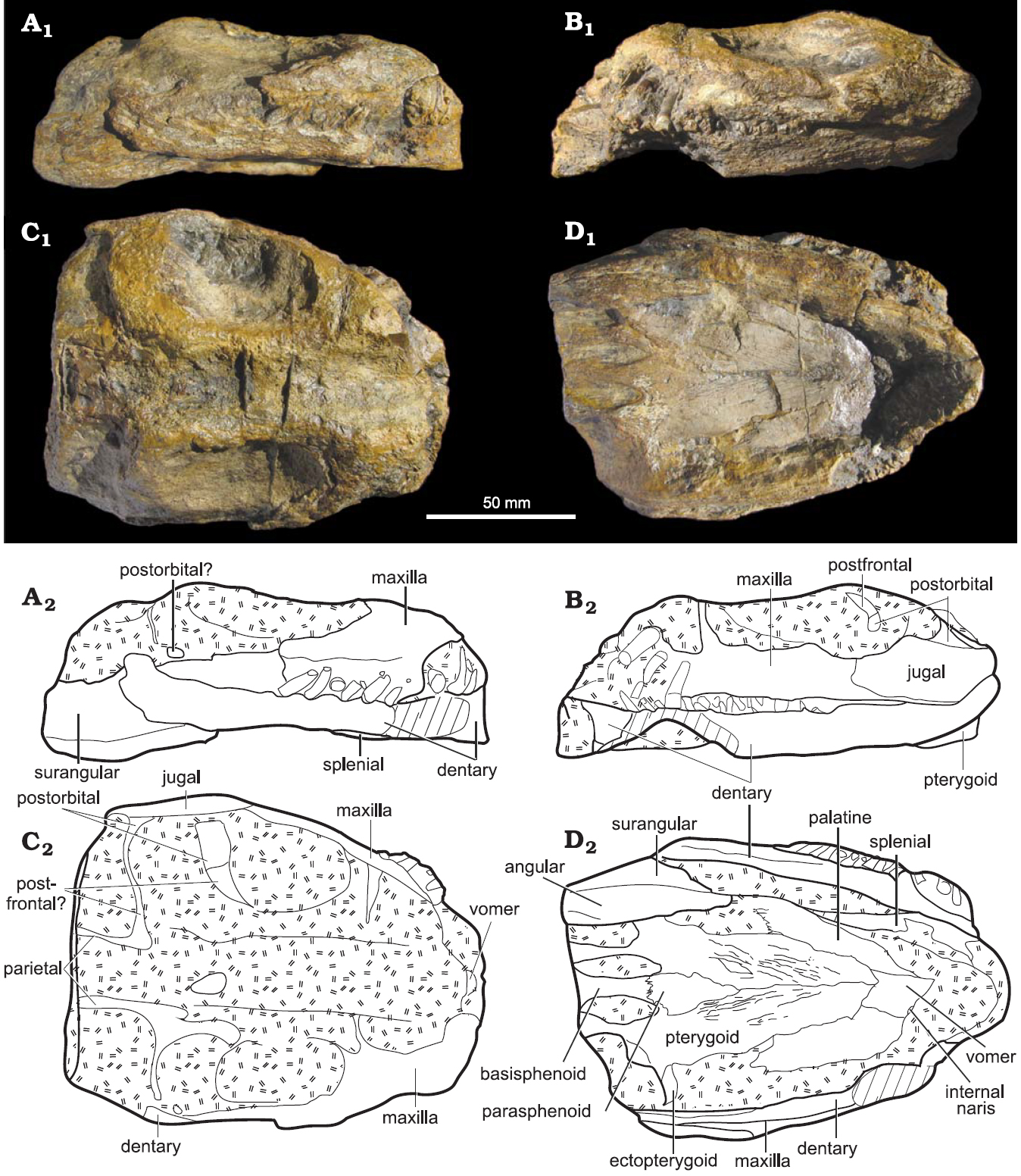
- Holotype partial skull and explanatory drawings

Scientific classification
- Kingdom: Animalia
- Phylum: Chordata
- Class: Reptilia
- Superorder: †Sauropterygia
- Order: †Plesiosauria
- Suborder: †Pliosauroidea
- Family: †Pliosauridae
- Genus: †Lusonectes; Smith, Araújo & Mateus, 2012
- Species: †L. sauvagei

Binomial name
- †Lusonectes sauvagei Smith, Araújo & Mateus, 2012

= Lusonectes =

Lusonectes Temporal range: Toarcian, 183.7–174.97 Ma

Extinct genus of reptiles

Lusonectes (meaning "Portuguese swimmer") is an extinct genus of Pliosauroid from the Early Jurassic (Toarcian) São Gião Formation of Coimbra District, Portugal. It is known from a single partial skull and mandible. Originally described as a plesiosaurid, later studies have proposed affinities with microcleidids or early pliosaurids, though its exact position remains uncertain due to the fragmentary nature of the material.

== Etymology ==
The generic name is derived from the prefix Luso, from Latin Lusitania referring to Portugal, and nektes ("swimmer" in Greek). The specific name honors Henri Émile Sauvage, who was the first person to describe the holotype specimen.

== Discovery and naming ==
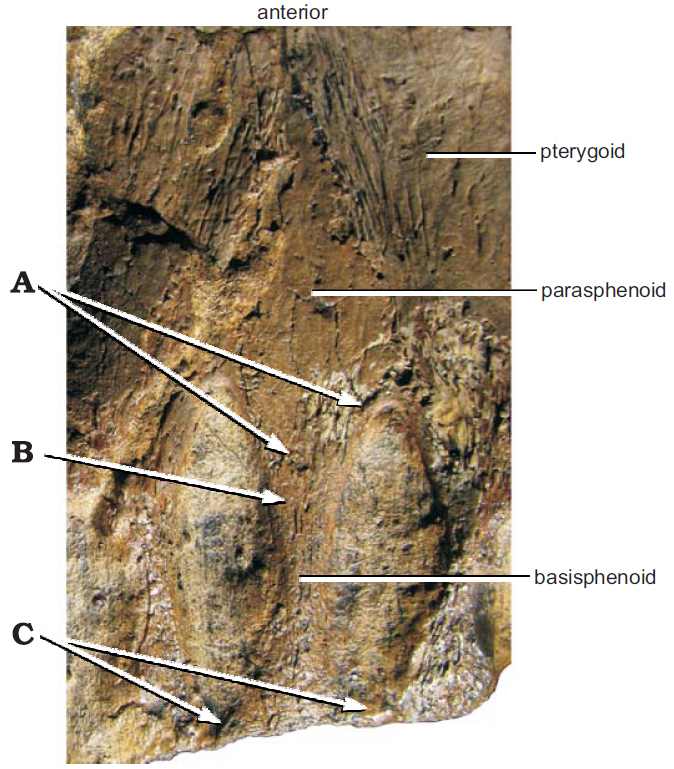
Rear of the palate and basicranium

The holotype, MG33, a partial skull and articulated mandible, was discovered possibly by geologist Paul Choffat and his team during the 19th century within rocks from the São Gião Formation near Alhadas, Coimbra District, Portugal.

Henri Émile Sauvage (1898) described MG33 as belonging to an unknown species of Plesiosaurus. Other authors, including Bardet et al. (2008) and Ruiz−Omeñaca et al. (2009) also classified MG33 within Plesiosaurus. Castanhinha and Mateus (2007) and Smith & Vincent (2010) instead classified the specimen as an indeterminate member of Plesiosauria.

The specimen was described and named by Adam S. Smith, Ricardo Araújo and Octávio Mateus in 2012 as Lusonectes sauvagei. Lusonectes was described as the first diagnostic plesiosaur species discovered in Portugal to date.

== Description ==
It is based on a single autapomorphy, a broad triangular parasphenoid cultriform process that is as long as the posterior interpterygoid vacuities, and also on a unique character combination. The holotype (MG 33) preserves the middle portion of the skull and mandible, lacking the preorbital and much of the posterior, and the dorsal surface heavily weathered. The left orbit is nearly complete and oval-shaped, elongated anteroposteriorly. Parts of the postorbital bars and the anterior margins of the temporal fenestra are preserved. A depression in the Interorbital region may indicate the position of a pineal foramen.

The palatal surface is better preserved. The parasphenoid bears a distinctive flat, broad, triangular cultriform process that extends roughly as far forward as the posterior interpterygoid vacuities are long. This feature is considered autapomorphic for the genus. The basisphenoid is unkeeled and forms much of the medial and posterior margins of the posterior interpterygoid vacuities. A narrow, slit-like opening between the anterior pterygoids may represent an anterior interpterygoid vacuity, though this interpretation is uncertain due to damage.The maxilla, jugal bone, and other elements are fragmentary. The jugal's contribution to the orbital margin is unclear. Teeth are slender and conical with circular cross-sections; any apparent lack of enamel ornamentation is likely due to preservation rather than a biological trait. A 2026 redescription confirmed the diagnostic value of the parasphenoid morphology while offering alternative interpretations for several other features, such as the extent of the palatines and the identity of some mandibular bones.

== Classification ==
Smith, Araújo and Mateus (2012) found Lusonectes to belong to the Plesiosauridae when placed within a cladogram created by Ketchum and Benson (2010). A 2026 phylogenetic reassessment using an updated version of the Benson & Druckenmiller (2014) character matrix recovered varying placements depending on the analytical method. Equal-weights parsimony analyses tended to recover it among early plesiosauroids, while implied weighting analyses placed it as an early-diverging pliosaurid, often near Thalassiodracon hawkinsii. The authors noted that early plesiosaur relationships are unstable and that the poor preservation of MG 33 limits confidence in its precise position. Earlier informal assignments to Microcleididae are no longer supported. The 2026 main topology goes as follows:

- Plesiosauria
  - Rhomaleosauridae
  - Pliosauridae
    - Stratesaurus taylori
    - - Lusonectes sauvagei
      - Thalassiodracon hawkinsii
    - Eoplesiosaurus antiquior
    - Plesiopharos moelensis
    - Plesiosaurus dolichodeirus
    - Eretmosaurus rugosus
    - Microcleididae
      - Plesiopterys wildi (SMNS 16812)
      - Plesiopterys wildi (MH 7)
      - Franconiasaurus brevispinus

== Paleoenvironment ==
The São Gião Formation consists primarily of hemipelagic marl–limestone alternations deposited in a marine shelf environment on the western margin of the Tethys Ocean. The formation is subdivided into several informal members: the lower part (including levels that yielded MG 33) includes marly limestones with brachiopods and other benthic fauna, transitioning into thinner nodular limestones and marl-limestone alternations. These sediments record a range of shallow to mid-shelf conditions, with evidence of periodic bottom-water oxygen depletion, especially around the Toarcian Oceanic Anoxic Event near the Polymorphum–Levisoni chronozone boundary. The formation preserves a diverse marine fauna, including ammonites, brachiopods, bivalves, foraminifera, calcareous nannofossils, and ichnofossils such as Zoophycos and Thalassinoides. Other local vertebrates include remains referred to the ichthyosaur Stenopterygius from Condeixa-a-Nova. Benthic communities show fluctuations in diversity and body size, interpreted as responses to environmental stressors including warming, reduced oxygen levels, and changes in nutrient availability during the early Toarcian biotic crisis.

== See also ==
- List of plesiosaur genera
- Timeline of plesiosaur research
