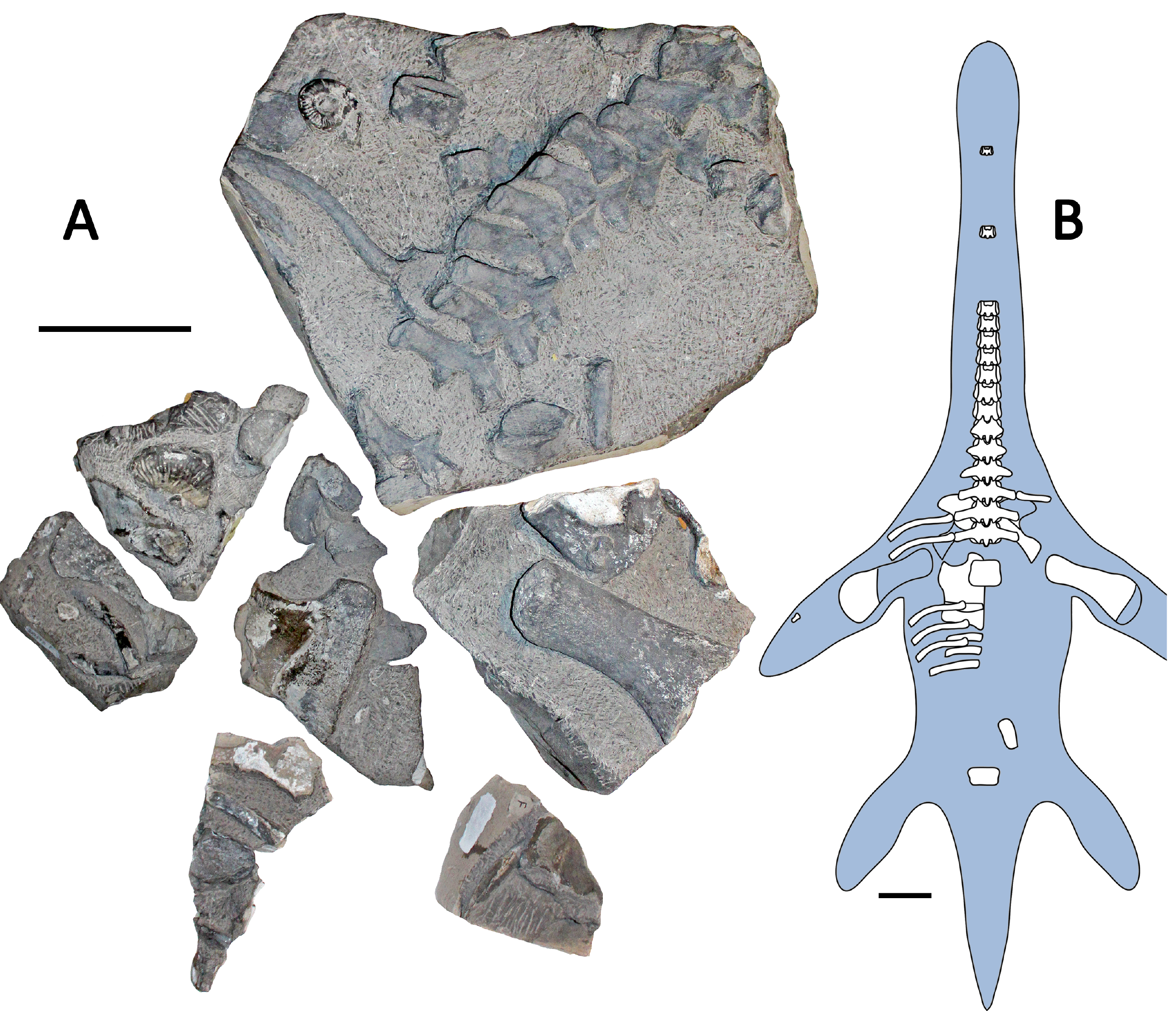
- Holotype material as preserved (A) and tentatively arranged in life position (B)

Scientific classification
- Kingdom: Animalia
- Phylum: Chordata
- Class: Reptilia
- Superorder: †Sauropterygia
- Order: †Plesiosauria
- Superfamily: †Plesiosauroidea
- Genus: †Gondwananectes; Otero et al., 2026
- Species: †G. osvaldoi

Binomial name
- †Gondwananectes osvaldoi Otero et al., 2026

= Gondwananectes =

Gondwananectes Temporal range: Middle Jurassic (early Bajocian), ~170 Ma

Genus of plesiosaur

Gondwananectes (lit. 'Gondwana swimmer') is an extinct genus of plesiosauroid plesiosaur known from the Middle Jurassic (Bajocian age) Quehuita Formation of Chile. The genus contains a single species, Gondwananectes osvaldoi, known from a partial skeleton.

== Discovery and naming ==
The Gondwananectes fossil material was discovered by Osvaldo Rojas, who collected it with a team of paleontologists in 2014. The bones were found at the 'Ojo Opache locality', representing outcrops of the Quehuita Formation, a site situated 10 kilometres (6.2 mi) west of Calama in Antofagasta Region, northern Chile. The specimen was found in several scattered fragments, which were transferred to the Museum of Natural and Cultural History of the Atacama Desert in Chile (MUHNCAL), where it is now is permanently accessioned as MUHNCAL.20173.

In 2020, Rodrigo A. Otero and colleagues published a preliminary report of the specimen, noting it as the first Middle Jurassic plesiosaur found in that region. They identified it as a possible member of the plesiosaur family Rhomaleosauridae based on putative pelvic bones with apparent similarities to those of the Early Jurassic Lindwurmia of Germany. Additional preparation by Otero between late 2024 and early 2025 allowed for improved study of the material, and revealed that these 'pelvic bones' were actually part of the pectoral girdle. Full preparation revealed that the extent of preserved material comprises several articulated cervical (neck) vertebrae and partial pectoral and dorsal (trunk) vertebrae, several ribs and gastralia], part of the pectoral girdle (coracoids and scapulae), and badly damaged bones that may be part of the ilium (a pelvic bone).

In 2026, Otero and colleagues described Gondwananectes osvaldoi as a new genus and species of early plesiosauroid plesiosaurs based on these fossil remains, establishing MUHNCAL.20173 as the holotype specimen. The generic name, Gondwananectes, combines 'Gondwana', the ancient southern supercontinent, with the Greek word nēktēs (a common plesiosaur name suffix), meaning 'swimmer'. The specific name, osvaldoi, honors Osvaldo Rojas, the discoverer of the holotype and director of MUHNCAL.

== Description ==
As preserved, the articulated cervical and dorsal vertebrae measure about 30 centimetres (12 in) long. Based on the postulated pelvic girdle morphology, the trunk region likely measured 60 cm (24 in). Similarly, the humerus size implies a 60–70 cm (24–28 in)-long forelimb. Based on comparisons with closely related plesiosauroids, Gondwananectes likely had around 29–39 cervical vertebrae adn 20–23 dorsal vertebrae. In combination, the total body length was likely between 1.5 and 2 m (4.9 and 6.6 ft). Based on some degree of vertebral fusion in the holotype individual, it was not an especially young animal when it died. It was likely a subadult, nearing maturity.

== Classification ==
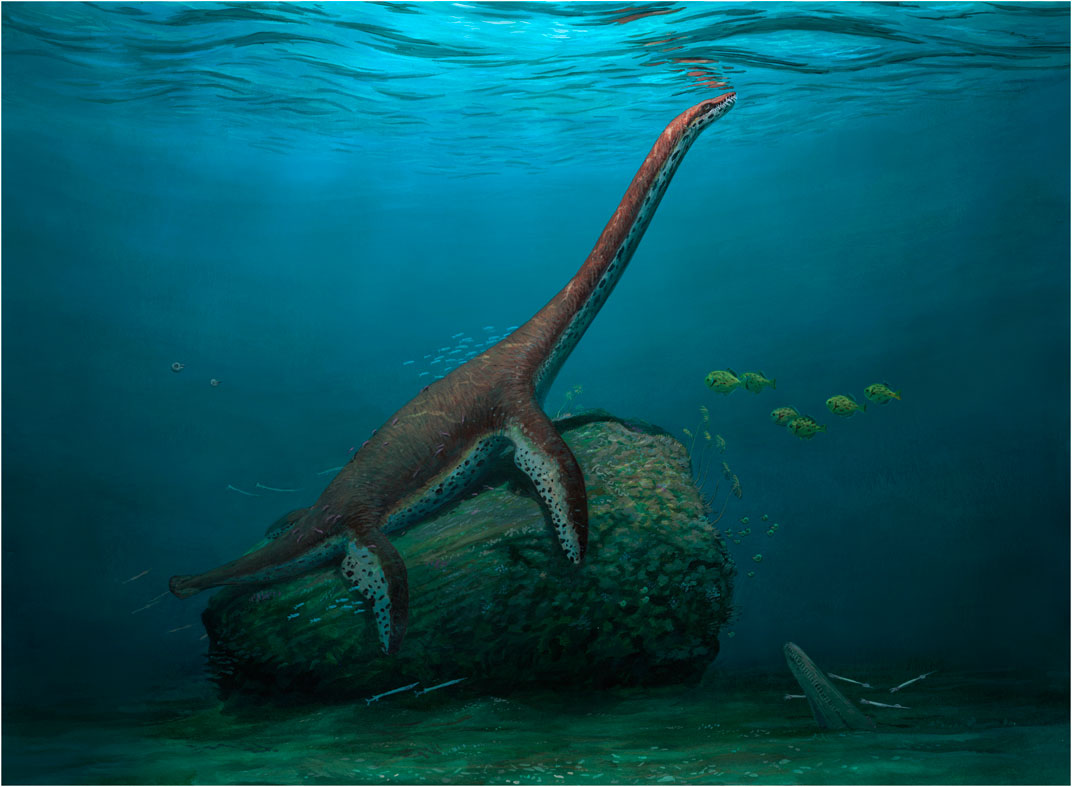
Life restoration of the more basal Franconiasaurus

To test the affinities and relationships of Gondwananectes, Otero et al. (2026) included it in an updated version of the phylogenetic matrix of O'Gorman et al. (2024). This dataset recovered Gondwananectes as a member of the plesiosaur clade Plesiosauroidea, diverging after Franconiasaurus, as the sister taxon to the more derived clade Cryptoclidia. These results are displayed in the cladogram below:

- Plesiosauroidea
  - Plesiosaurus dolichodeirus
  - - Eretmosaurus rugosus
    - - Westphaliasaurus simonsensii
      - - Microcleididae
        - - Plesiopterys wildi
          - - Franconiasaurus brevispinus
            - - Gondwananectes osvaldoi
              - Cryptoclidia
                - Cryptoclididae
                - Xenopsaria
                  - Elasmosauridae
                  - - Leptocleidia
                    - - Brancasaurus brancai
                      - Gronausaurus wegneri

== See also ==
- List of plesiosaur genera
- Timeline of plesiosaur research
