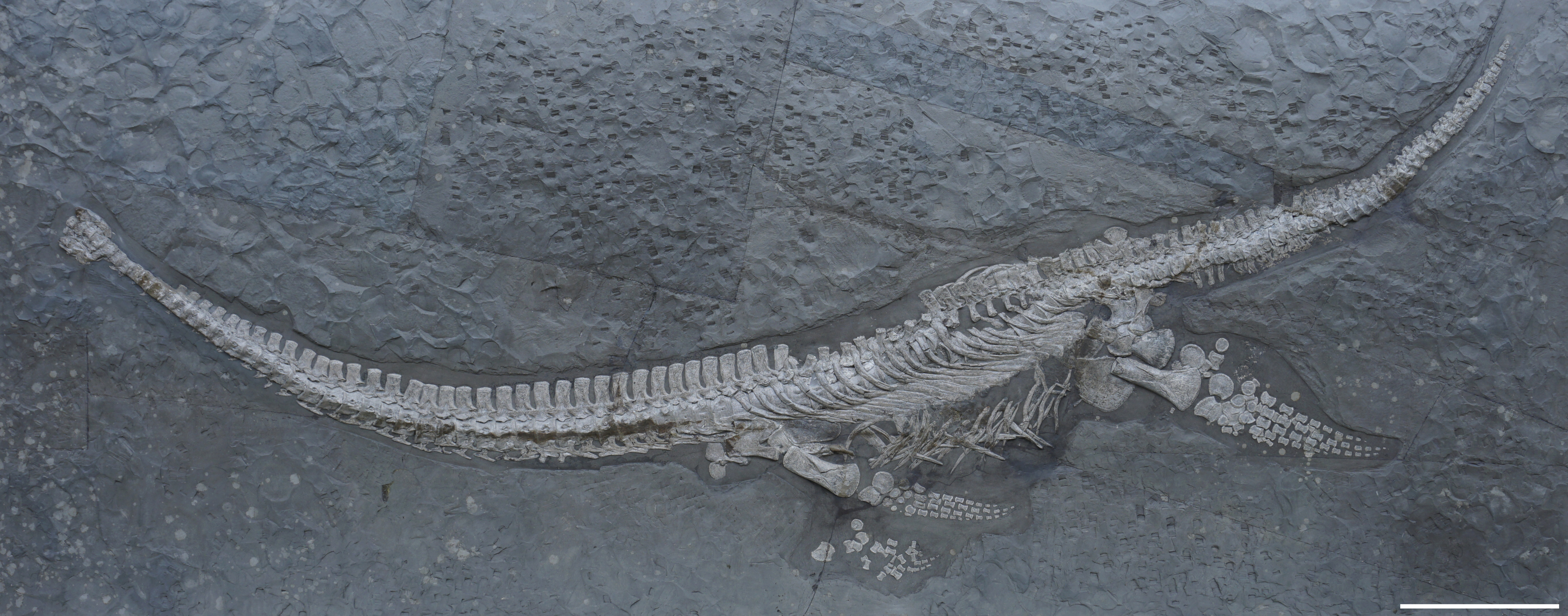
- Holotype specimen

Scientific classification
- Kingdom: Animalia
- Phylum: Chordata
- Class: Reptilia
- Superorder: †Sauropterygia
- Order: †Plesiosauria
- Superfamily: †Plesiosauroidea
- Genus: †Plesionectes; Sachs & Madzia, 2025
- Species: †P. longicollum

Binomial name
- †Plesionectes longicollum Sachs & Madzia, 2025

= Plesionectes =

Plesionectes Temporal range: Early Jurassic, Toarcian

Extinct genus of plesiosauroids

Plesionectes (meaning "near swimmer") is an extinct genus of basal plesiosauroid plesiosaurs known from the Early Jurassic (Toarcian age) Posidonia Shale of Germany. The genus contains a single species, Plesionectes longicollum, known from a well-preserved, nearly complete skeleton.

== Discovery and naming ==
The Plesionectes holotype specimen, SMNS 51945, was discovered in 1978 by Gotthilf Fischer in outcrops of the Posidonia Shale (Posidonienschiefer Formation) in Holzmaden in Southwest Germany. The specimen, consisting of a very well-preserved, mostly articulated, nearly complete skeleton, was obtained by the State Museum of Natural History Stuttgart (SMNS) the following year, where it has been accessioned since. The specimen belongs to a skeletally immature individual.

In 2025, Sven Sachs and Daniel Madzia described Plesionectes longicollum as a new genus and species of early plesiosauroids based on these fossil remains. The generic name, Plesionectes, combines the Greek words plēsíon, meaning "near" or "close", in reference to the clade Plesiosauria, and nēktēs (a common plesiosaur name suffix), meaning "swimmer". The specific name, longicollum, combines the Latin words longus, meaning "long" and collum, meaning "neck", referencing the greatly elongated neck of this species.

== Description ==
Plesionectes has at least 43 cervical (neck) vertebrae, 20 or 21 dorsal vertebrae, at least two sacral vertebrae, and at least 39 caudal (tail) vertebrae. As preserved, the holotype skeleton is 2.95 metres (9.7 ft) long. Including the skull, which is poorly preserved in the holotype, this individual was likely close to 3.2 metres (10 ft) long in life.

The holotype specimen preserves patches of soft tissue impressions around the neck, tail, and hindlimb. These provide some insight into the potential color and integument of Plesionectes. The soft tissue impressions include dark films that may indicate regions of dark colouration (eumelanin) in life.

== Classification ==
In their phylogenetic analysis (reduced strict consensus, weighted parsimony), Sachs & Madzia (2025) recovered Plesionectes in a basal position within the Plesiosauroidea. This version of the analysis placed Plesionectes as the sister taxon to Plesiopharos in a clade also including Stratesaurus. These results are displayed in the cladogram below:

- Plesiosauria
  - Rhomaleosauridae
  - - Pliosauridae
    - Plesiosauroidea
      - Rhaeticosaurus
      - - Attenborosaurus
        - - Eoplesiosaurus
          - - Plesiosaurus
            - - - Stratesaurus
                - - Plesionectes
                  - Plesiopharos
              - - Microcleididae
                - - Plesiopterys (SMNS 16812)
                  - - Plesiopterys (MH 7)
                    - - Franconiasaurus
                      - Cryptoclidia
