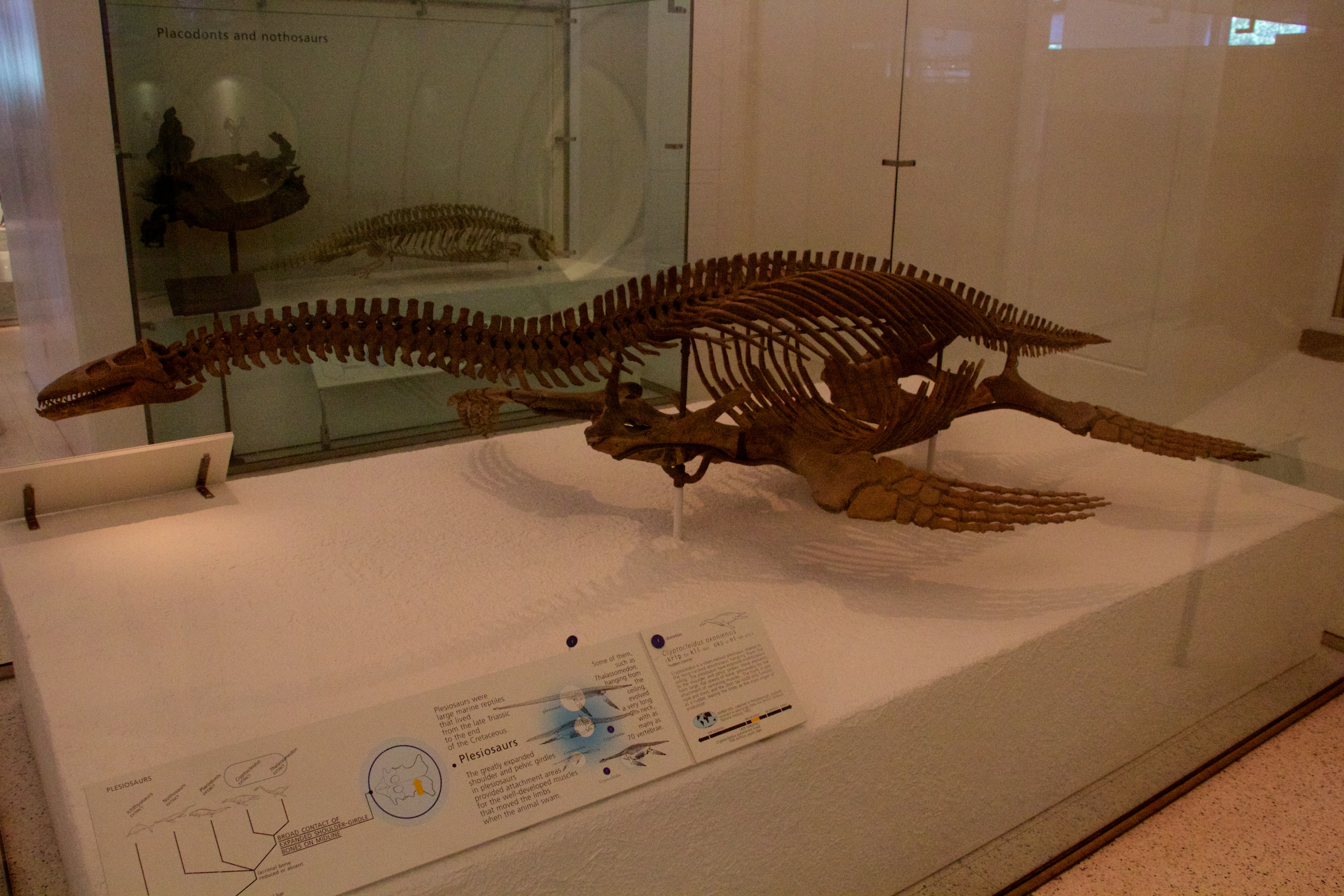
- Skeletal mount at the American Museum of Natural History

Scientific classification
- Kingdom: Animalia
- Phylum: Chordata
- Class: Reptilia
- Superorder: †Sauropterygia
- Order: †Plesiosauria
- Superfamily: †Plesiosauroidea
- Family: †Cryptoclididae
- Subfamily: †Cryptoclidinae
- Genus: †Cryptoclidus; Seeley, 1892

Type species
- †Plesiosaurus eurymerus Phillips, 1871

Species
- C. eurymerus Phillips, 1871 (type); C. richardsoni Lydekker, 1889

Synonyms
- Apractocleidus Smellie, 1915; Plesiosaurus eurymerus Phillips, 1871

= Cryptoclidus =

Cryptoclidus Temporal range: Middle Jurassic to Late Jurassic (Callovian to Oxfordian), 166–160 Ma

Extinct genus of reptiles

Cryptoclidus (/krɪptoʊˈklaɪdəs/ krip-toh-KLY-dəs) is a genus of plesiosaur reptile from the Middle Jurassic period of England, France, and Cuba.

== Discovery ==
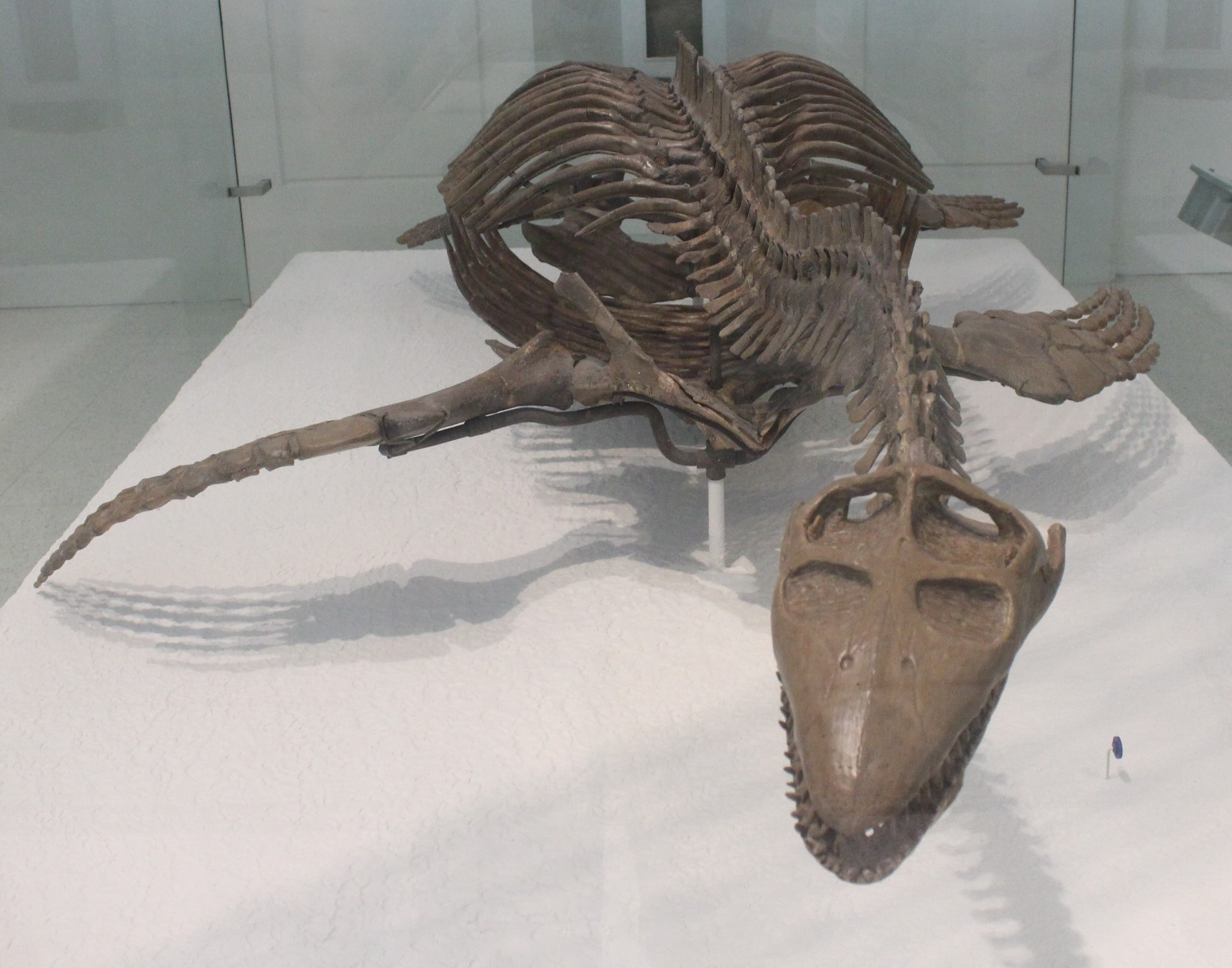
Skeleton AMNH 995

Cryptoclidus was a plesiosaur whose specimens include adult and juvenile skeletons, and remains which have been found in various degrees of preservation in England, Northern France, Russia, and South America. Its name, meaning "hidden clavicles", refer to its small, practically invisible clavicles buried in its front limb girdle.

The type species was initially described as Plesiosaurus eurymerus. The specific name "wide femur" refers to the forelimb, which was mistaken for a hindlimb at the time. It was moved to its own genus Cryptoclidus by Seeley (1892).

Fossils of Cryptoclidus have been found in the Oxford Clay of Cambridgeshire, England. The dubious species Cryptoclidus beaugrandi is known from Kimmeridgian-age deposits in Boulogne-sur-Mer, France. Cryptoclidus vignalensis, which is now considered undiagnostic, hails from the Jagua Formation of western Cuba.

In 2016, there was a report about a fragmentary Cryptoclidus postcranial skeleton from the Callovian deposits of Nikitino village in Spassky District, Ryazan Oblast, Russia, but later Zverkov et al. defined it as an intedermitate cryptoclidid.

== Description ==
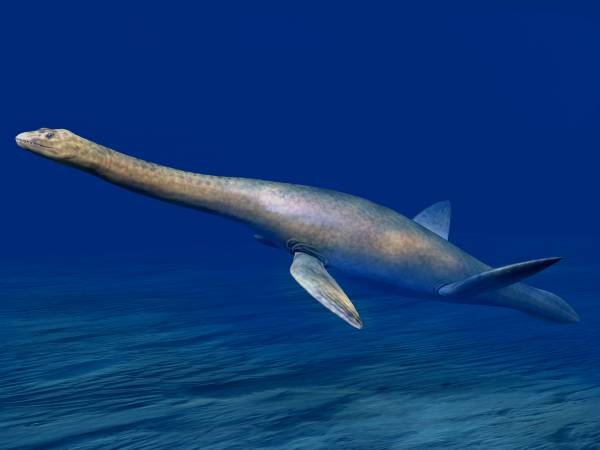
Life reconstruction of C. eurymerus

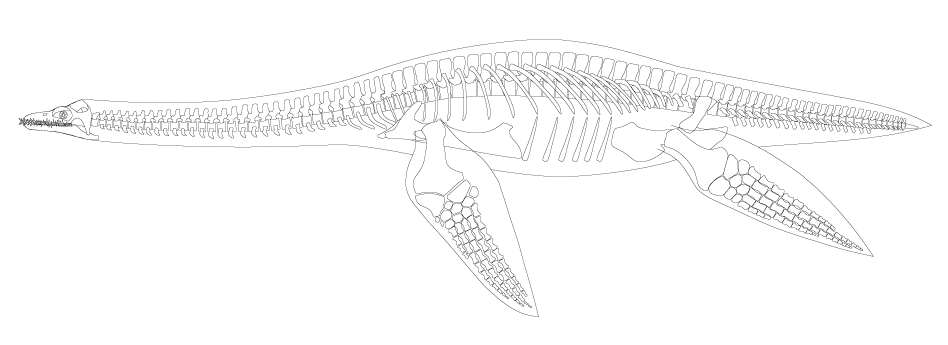
Skeletal diagram

Cryptoclidus was a medium-sized plesiosaur, with the largest individuals measuring up to 4 m (13 ft) long and weighing about 737–756 kg (1,625–1,667 lb). The fragile build of the head and teeth preclude any grappling with prey, and suggest a diet of small, soft-bodied animals such as squid and shoaling fish. Cryptoclidus may have used its long, intermeshing teeth to strain small prey from the water, or perhaps sift through sediment for buried animals.

The size and shape of the nares and nasal openings have led Brown and Cruickshank (1994) to argue that they were used to sample seawater for smells and chemical traces.

== Classification ==
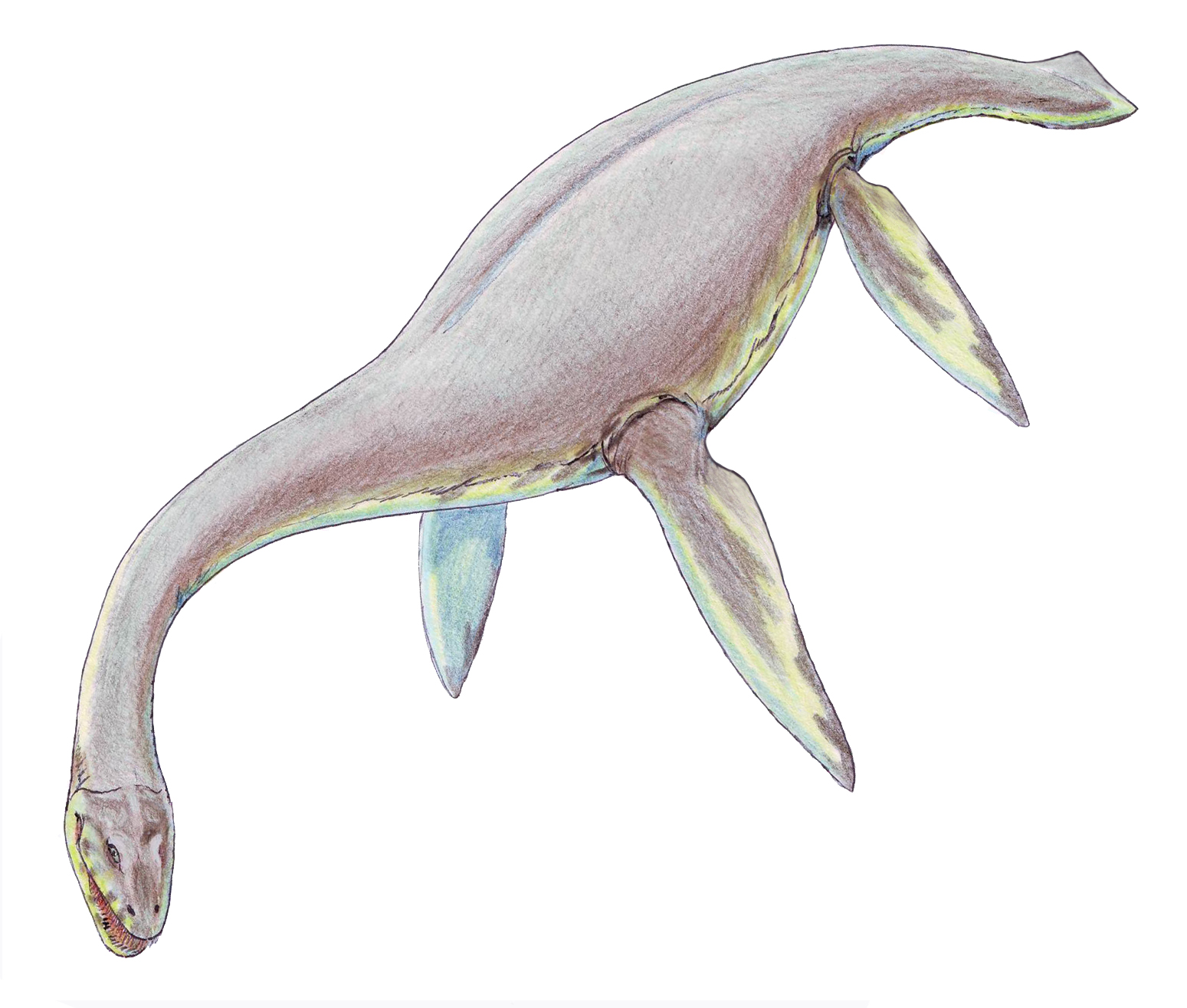
Life restoration of C. oxoniensis, currently considered a dubious species synonymous with C. eurymerus

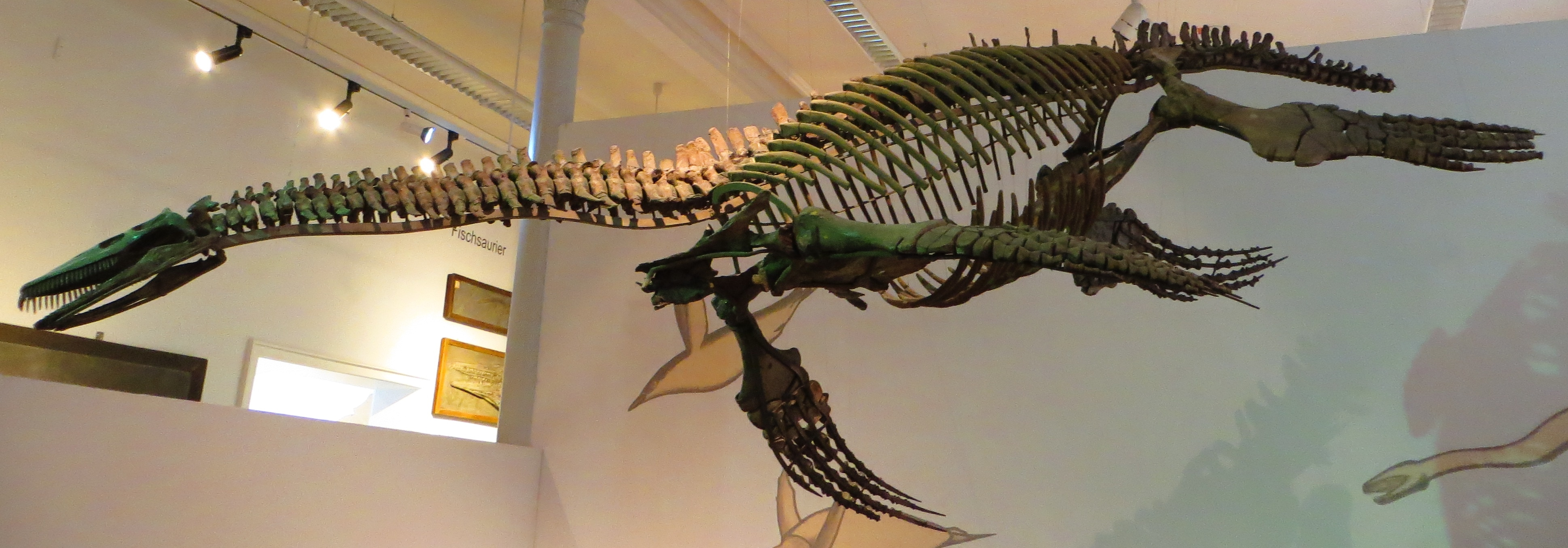
Cast of a fossil skeleton, University of Tübingen, with the fore and hindlimbs swapped

The cladogram below follows the topology from Benson et al. (2012) analysis.

- Pistosauria
  - "Pistosaurus postcranium"
  - Pistosaurus
  - Yunguisaurus liae
  - - Augustasaurus hagdorni
    - Plesiosauria
      - Bobosaurus forojuliensis
      - - NHMUK 49202 [now Anningasaura lymense]
        - - Rhomaleosauridae
          - Neoplesiosauria
            - Pliosauridae
              - Thalassiodracon hawkinsii
              - - Hauffiosaurus spp.
                - - Attenborosaurus conybeari
                  - advanced pliosaurids (Peloneustes)
            - Plesiosauroidea
              - Eoplesiosaurus antiquior
              - - Plesiosaurus dolichodeirus
                - - - Plesiopterys wildi
                    - Cryptoclidus eurymerus
                  - Microcleididae
                    - Eretmosaurus rugosus
                    - Westphaliasaurus simonsensii
                    - - Seeleyosaurus guilelmiimperatoris
                      - - Microcleidus tournemiensis
                        - - Microcleidus brachypterygius
                          - Microcleidus homalospondylus

== See also ==
- List of plesiosaur genera
- Timeline of plesiosaur research
