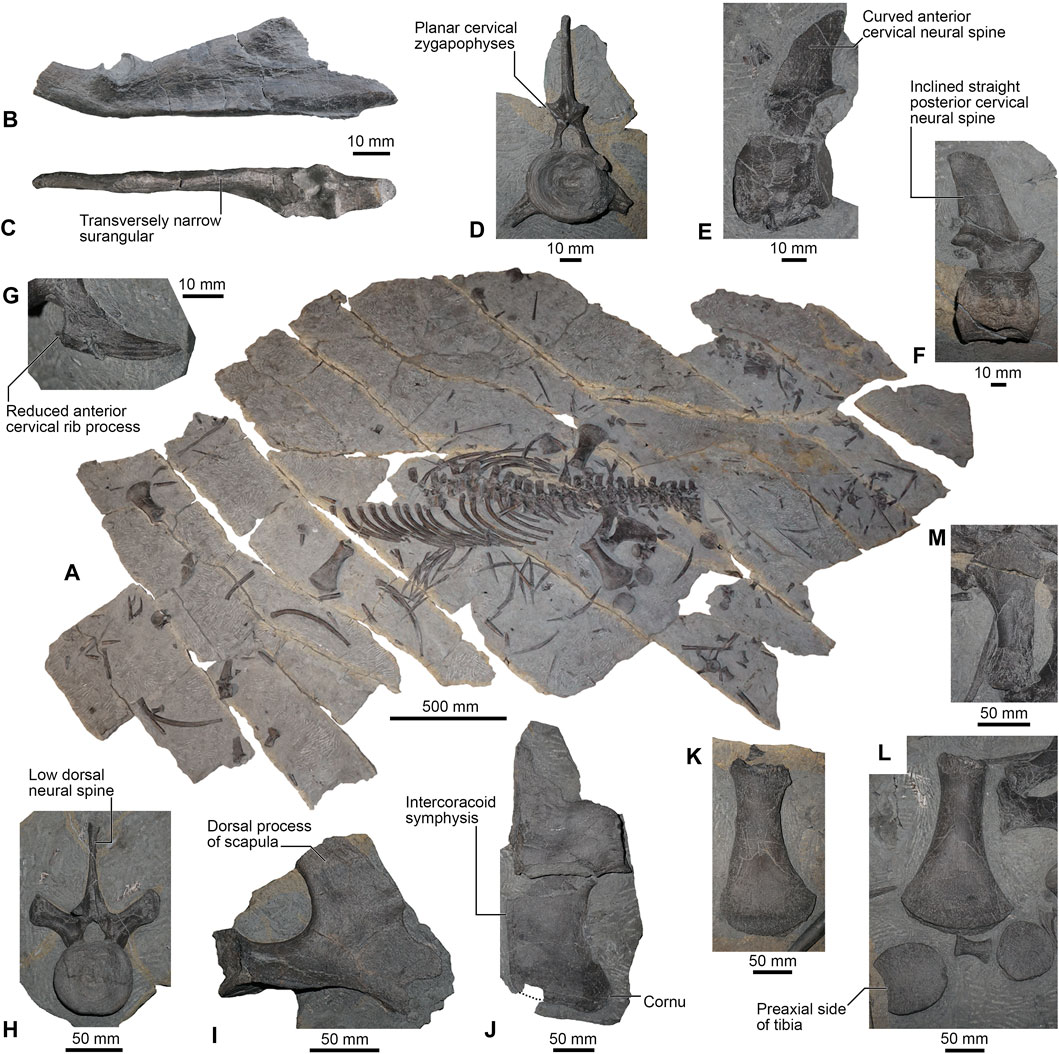
- Holotype specimen of Franconiasaurus

Scientific classification
- Kingdom: Animalia
- Phylum: Chordata
- Class: Reptilia
- Superorder: †Sauropterygia
- Order: †Plesiosauria
- Superfamily: †Plesiosauroidea
- Genus: †Franconiasaurus
- Species: †F. brevispinus

Binomial name
- †Franconiasaurus brevispinus Sachs, Eggmaier & Madzia, 2024

= Franconiasaurus =

Franconiasaurus Temporal range: Early Jurassic (late Toarcian), ~175 Ma

Genus of plesiosaurs

Franconiasaurus (meaning "Franconia reptile") is an extinct genus of basal plesiosauroid plesiosaurs from the Early Jurassic of Germany. The genus contains a single species, F. brevispinus, known from two well-preserved three-dimensional skeletons.

== Discovery and naming ==
The Franconiasaurus fossil material was discovered in sediments of the Mistelgau fossil pit of the lower Jurensismergel Formation (Grammoceras thouarsense Zone) in Bayreuth District, Bavaria, Germany. The holotype specimen, BT 011224.00, was discovered between 2014 and 2018 and consists of a nearly complete, partially articulated skeleton. BT 011241.00, an incomplete disarticulated specimen discovered in 2005, was also referred to Franconiasaurus.

In 2024, Sachs, Eggmaier & Madzia described Franconiasaurus brevispinus as a new genus and species of plesiosauroid based on these fossil remains. The generic name, "'Franconiasaurus", combines Franconia, after the Bavarian region of the type locality, with the Greek "σαῦρος" ("sauros"), meaning "reptile". The specific name, "brevispinus", references the short neural spines of some of the cervical and dorsal vertebrae.

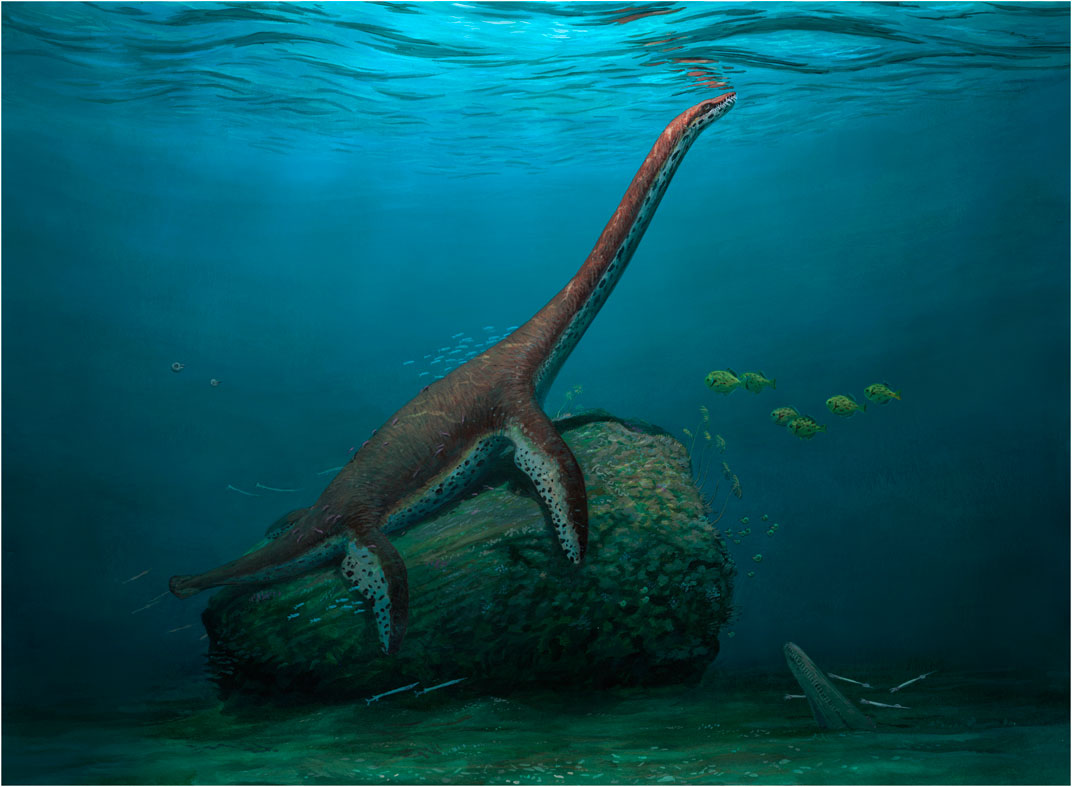
Life restoration

== Classification ==
In their phylogenetic analyses, Sachs, Eggmaier & Madzia (2024) recovered Franconiasaurus as a plesiosauroid member of the Plesiosauria, as the sister taxon to the Cryptoclidia. This suggests that Franconiasaurus fills an evolutionary gap between more basal taxa (like early plesiosauroids including Plesiosaurus-like forms and microcleidids) and later-diverging taxa (including cryptoclidids, leptocleidians, and elasmosaurids). Their results are displayed in the cladogram below:

- Plesiosauroidea
  - Eoplesiosaurus
  - - Plesiosaurus
    - - Plesiopharos
      - - Westphaliasaurus
        - - Microcleididae
          - - Franconiasaurus
            - Cryptoclidia
              - Xenopsaria
                - Elasmosauridae
                - - Polycotylidae
                  - Leptocleididae
              - - Cryptoclididae

== See also ==
- List of plesiosaur genera
- Timeline of plesiosaur research
