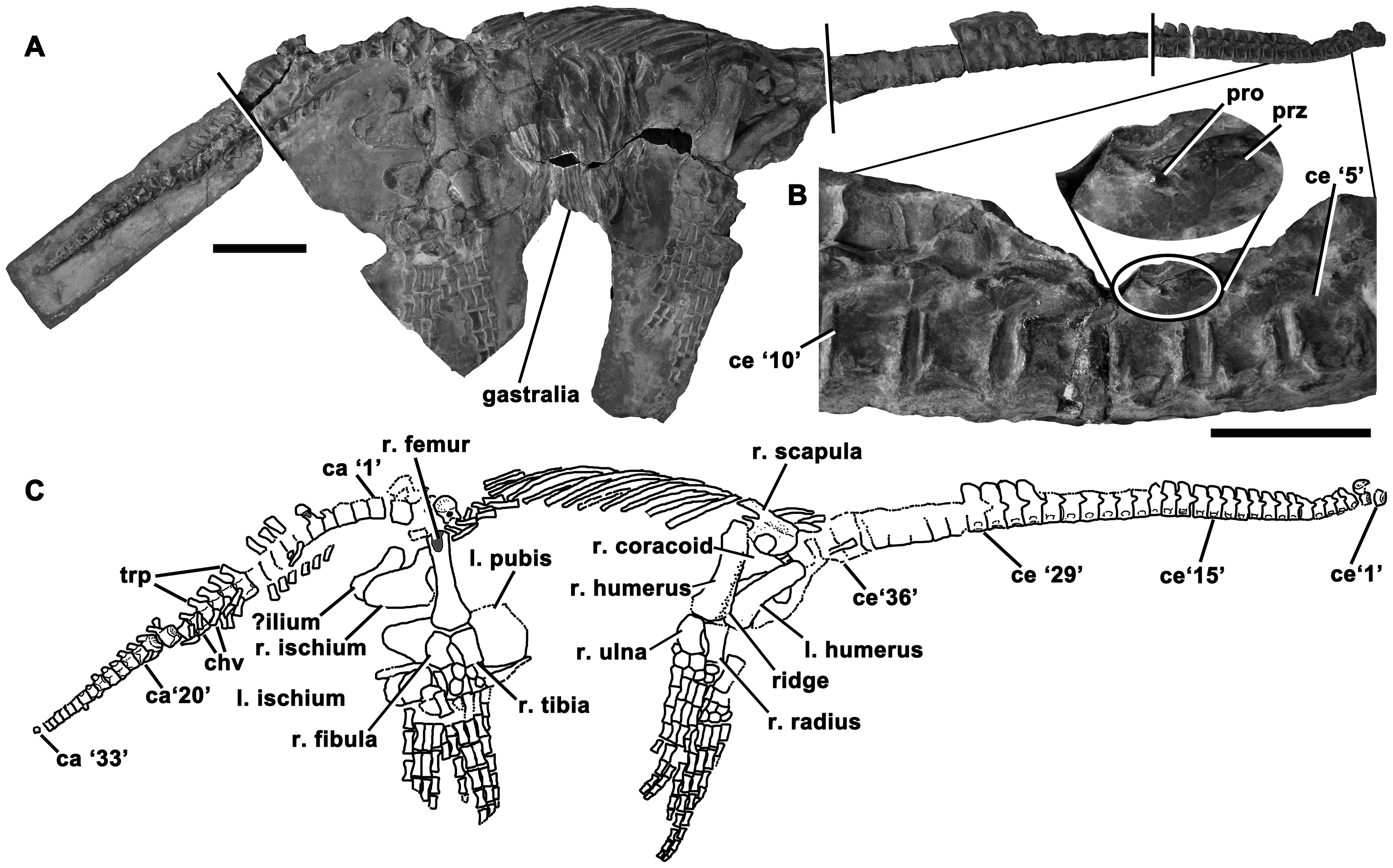
- Holotype specimen

Scientific classification
- Kingdom: Animalia
- Phylum: Chordata
- Class: Reptilia
- Superorder: †Sauropterygia
- Order: †Plesiosauria
- Superfamily: †Plesiosauroidea
- Genus: †Eoplesiosaurus; Benson, Evans & Druckenmiller, 2012

Type species
- †Eoplesiosaurus antiquior Benson, Evans & Druckenmiller, 2012

= Eoplesiosaurus =

Eoplesiosaurus Temporal range: Early Jurassic, 199.6–198 Ma

Extinct genus of reptiles

Eoplesiosaurus is an extinct genus of basal plesiosaur known from the Early Jurassic period (most likely earliest Hettangian stage) of the United Kingdom. It contains a single species, E. antiquior.

== Discovery ==
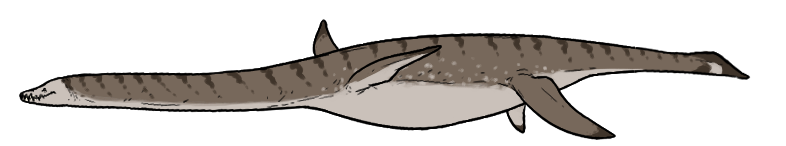
Life restoration

Eoplesiosaurus is known only from the holotype specimen TTNCM 8348, a complete and articulated postcranial skeleton. It is preserved three-dimensionally with some gastralia presented. It was collected at Watchet, of Somerset, from the Pre-Planorbis beds of the Blue Lias Formation of the Lower Lias Group. These beds likely occur below the first occurrence of the ammonite Psiloceras planorbis. Thus, they probably fall within the earliest Hettangian P. tilmanni Chronozone, which is about 199.6-198 million years old, immediately following the Triassic–Jurassic Boundary. Plesiosaur fossils which were discovered at Street (e.g. Avalonnectes and Thalassiodracon), or at penecontemporaneous strata such as the Watchet locality, represent the earliest known occurrence of the Plesiosauria. Hence, Eoplesiosaurus is one of the oldest plesiosaurs, to date.

Eoplesiosaurus was first described and named by Roger B. J. Benson, Mark Evans and Patrick S. Druckenmiller in 2012 and the type species is Eoplesiosaurus antiquior. The generic name is derived from Greek èos, "dawn", and Plesiosaurus in reference to its proportionally long neck, which is also present in Plesiosaurus. The specific name is derived from Latin meaning "more ancient", in reference to the old geologic age of the specimen and Duria Antiquior (meaning "a more ancient Dorset"), an 1830 watercolour depiction of Lower Jurassic fauna, including plesiosaurs and ichthyosaurs, by Henry De la Beche.

== Description ==
Eoplesiosaurus is a proportionally long-necked plesiosaurian with at least 38 cervical vertebrae. The presence of small, conical lateral projections on the bases of the anterior cervical prezygapophyses represents its autapomorphy.

== Classification ==
A phylogenetic analysis performed by Benson et al. (2012) found it to be the basalmost known plesiosauroid. The cladogram below shows Eoplesiosaurus phylogenetic position among other plesiosaurs following Benson et al. (2012).

- Plesiosauria
  - Rhomaleosauridae
  - Neoplesiosauria
    - Pliosauridae
    - Plesiosauroidea
      - Eoplesiosaurus antiquior
      - - Plesiosaurus dolichodeirus
        - - Microcleididae
          - - Plesiopterys wildi
            - Elasmosauridae and Cryptoclidia

However, an analysis performed by Benson & Druckenmiller (2014) found it as a basal plesiosaur, outside of Plesiosauroidea. The following cladogram shows the taxon's phylogenetic position following Benson & Druckenmiller (2014).

- - "Pistosaurus" postcranium
  - Yunguisaurus
  - - Augustasaurus
    - - Bobosaurus
      - Plesiosauria
        - Stratesaurus
        - Eoplesiosaurus
        - Rhomaleosauridae
        - Pliosauridae
          - Thalassiodracon
          - - Hauffiosaurus
            - - Attenborosaurus
              - - Marmornectes
                - Thalassophonea
        - Plesiosauroidea
          - Plesiosaurus
          - - Eretmosaurus
            - Westphaliasaurus
            - Microcleididae
            - - Plesiopterys
              - Cryptoclidia
                - Cryptoclididae
                - Xenopsaria
                  - Elasmosauridae
                  - Leptocleidia
                    - Leptocleididae
                    - Polycotylidae

== See also ==
- Timeline of plesiosaur research
