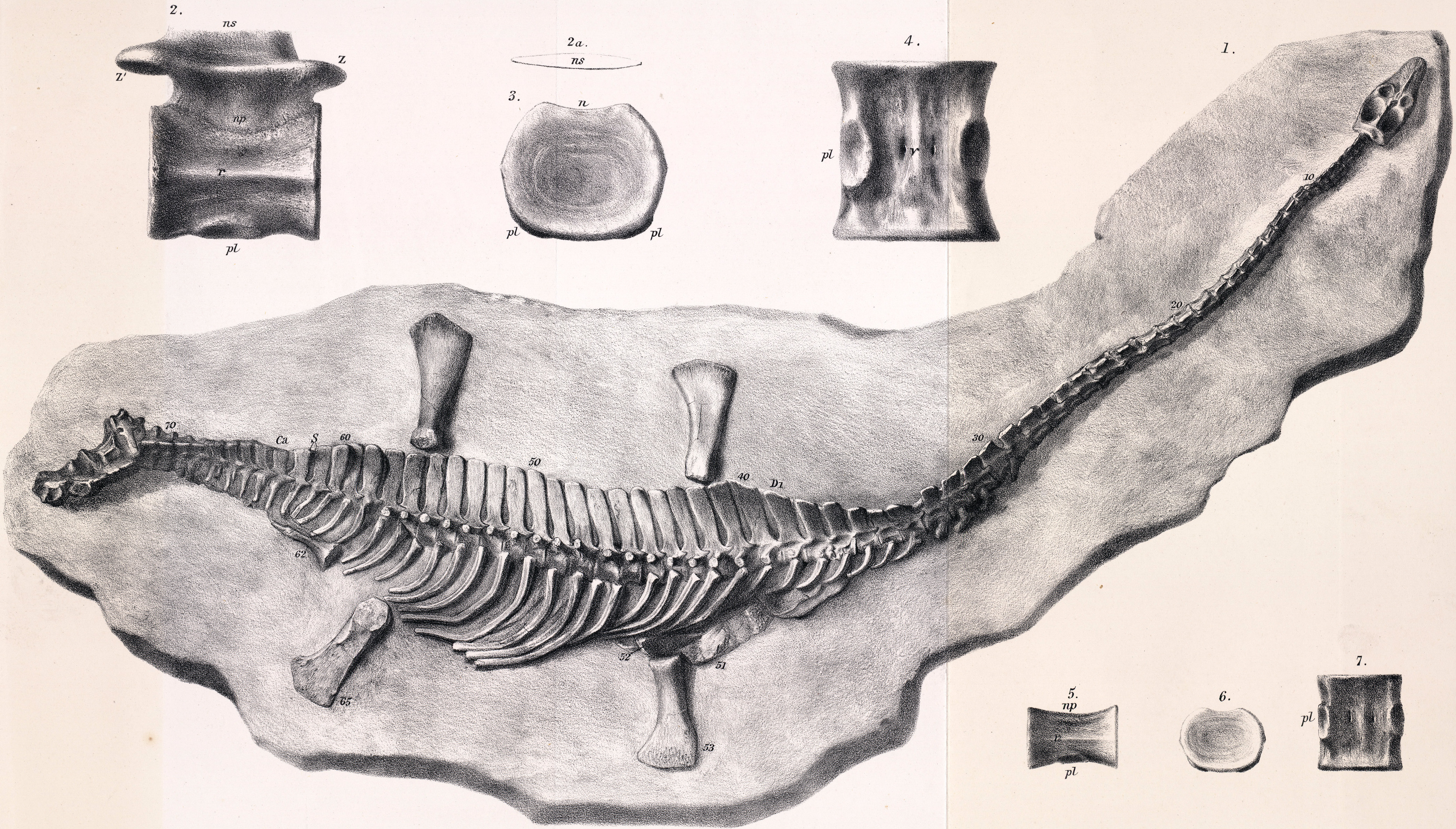
- Microcleidus homalospondylus skeleton (NHMUK PV OR 36184)

Scientific classification
- Kingdom: Animalia
- Phylum: Chordata
- Class: Reptilia
- Superorder: †Sauropterygia
- Order: †Plesiosauria
- Superfamily: †Plesiosauroidea
- Family: †Microcleididae; Benson, Evans & Druckenmiller, 2012

Genera
- †Lusonectes; †Microcleidus; †Seeleyosaurus; †Westphaliasaurus

= Microcleididae =

Microcleidids Temporal range: Early Jurassic, 193–175.6 Ma

Extinct family of reptiles

Microcleididae is an extinct family of basal plesiosauroid plesiosaurs from the Early Jurassic (middle Sinemurian to late Toarcian stages) of France, Germany, Portugal and the United Kingdom. Currently, the oldest and the most known microcleidid is Eretmosaurus from the middle Sinemurian of the United Kingdom. Microcleididae was formally named and described by Roger B. J. Benson, Mark Evans and Patrick S. Druckenmiller in 2012.

== History and Phylogeny ==
Großman (2007) referred informally to "microcleidid elasmosaurs", a clade comprising the three taxa referred to the Microcleididae by Benson et al. (2012). Ketchum and Benson (2010) found the traditional "microcleidid" genera to nest within a monophyletic Plesiosauridae, in a close position to Plesiosaurus. However, Ketchum and Benson (2011) performed a phylogenetic analysis which found a monospecific Plesiosauridae, and a monophyletic Microcleididae. Smith et al. (in press) described a new "microcleidid" Lusonectes, and obtained similar results in a different phylogenetic analysis. However, the family has not formally been erected until Benson et al. (2012) also found the same results in their analysis.

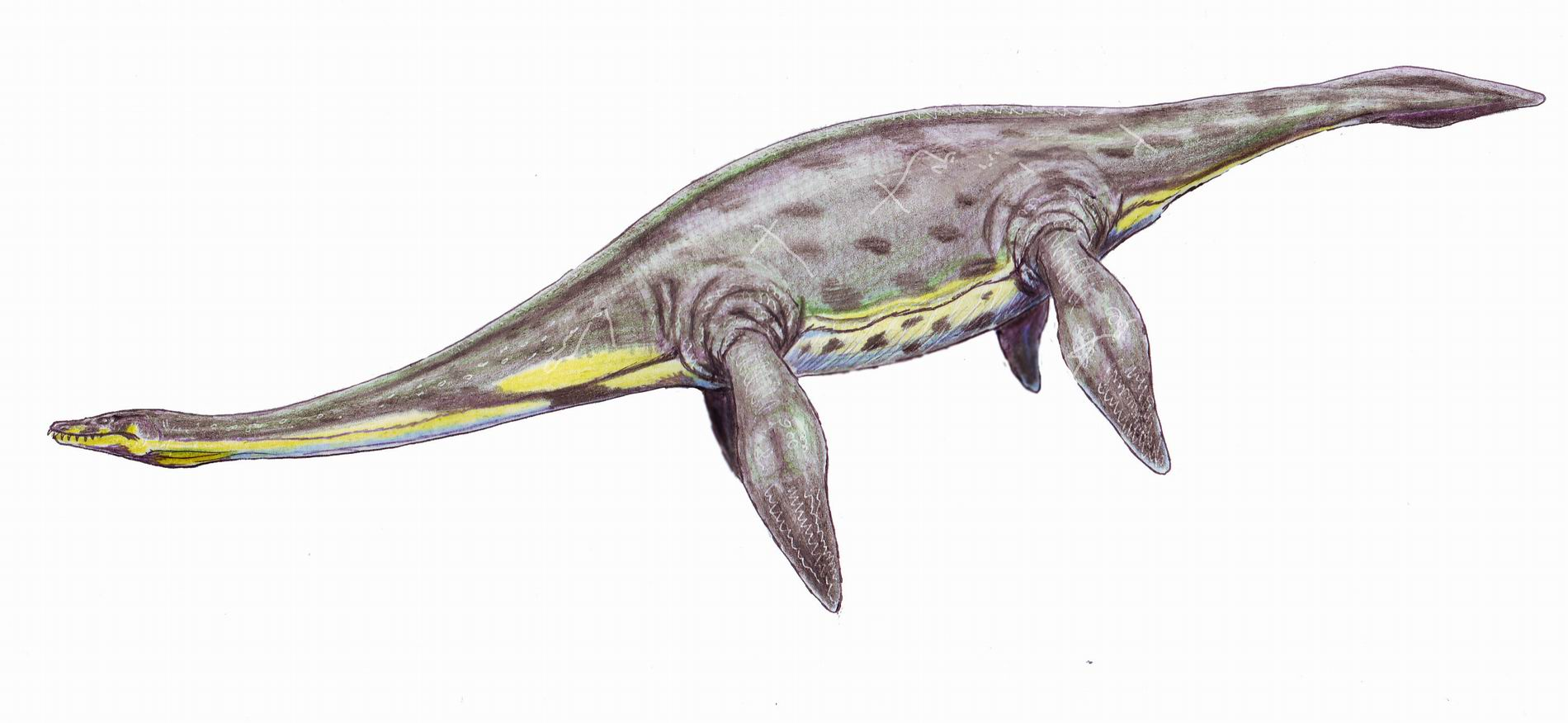
Restoration of Microcleidus homalospondylus

To avoid further confusion between Plesiosauridae and Microcleididae, Benson et al. (2012) proposed a stem-based definition for this taxon, utilizing Plesiosaurus as an external specifier. Microcleididae was defined as "Microcleidus homalospondylus and all taxa more closely related to it than to Plesiosaurus dolichodeirus, Cryptoclidus eurymerus, Elasmosaurus platyurus, Leptocleidus superstes, Pliosaurus brachydeirus or Polycotylus latipinnis." Benson et al. (2012) found strong support for Microcleididae, however their diagnosis focused on unambiguous postcranial synapomorphies since cranial material of basal microcleidids is unknown. The synapomorphies are: widely separated posterior cervical rib facets, posteriormost dorsal rib facets split between centrum and neural arch, medial surface of the iliac blade anteroposteriorly concave and a prominent flange extends anteriorly from the proximal half of the radius. This analysis focused on basal plesiosaurs and therefore only one derived pliosaurid and one cryptoclidian were included while elasmosaurids weren't included at all. The cladogram below follows the topology from Benson et al. (2012) analysis.

- Plesiosauria
  - Rhomaleosauridae
  - Neoplesiosauria
    - Pliosauridae
    - Plesiosauroidea
      - Eoplesiosaurus antiquior
      - - Plesiosaurus dolichodeirus
        - - - Plesiopterys wildi
            - Cryptoclidus eurymerus
          - Microcleididae
            - Eretmosaurus rugosus
            - Westphaliasaurus simonsensii
            - - Seeleyosaurus guilelmiimperatoris
              - - Microcleidus tournemiensis
                - - Microcleidus brachypterygius
                  - Microcleidus homalospondylus
