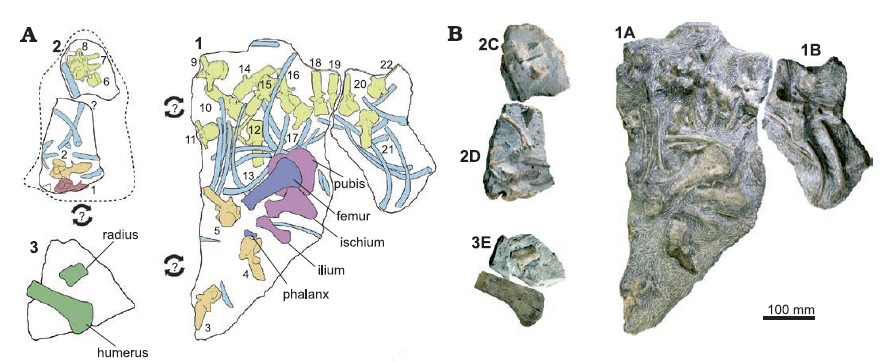
- Fossils

Scientific classification
- Kingdom: Animalia
- Phylum: Chordata
- Class: Reptilia
- Superorder: †Sauropterygia
- Order: †Plesiosauria
- Superfamily: †Plesiosauroidea (?)
- Genus: †Plesiopharos; Puértolas-Pascual et al., 2021
- Species: †P. moelensis

Binomial name
- †Plesiopharos moelensis Puértolas-Pascual et al., 2021

= Plesiopharos =

Plesiopharos Temporal range: Early Jurassic, 197–193 Ma

Extinct genus of plesiosaurs

Plesiopharos (derived from the Greek words πλησίος (plesios), "close" and φάρος (pharos), "lighthouse", because its holotype was found in the vicinity of a lighthouse + [from São Pedro de] Moel) is an extinct genus of plesiosaur from the Early Jurassic Coimbra Formation of Portugal. Specifically, it was discovered in São Pedro de Moel, Marinha Grande, from which the type species' binomial name, Plesiopharos moelensis, derives from.

At the time of its publication (2021), this plesiosaur was the most complete and oldest known from the Iberian Peninsula.

== Discovery ==
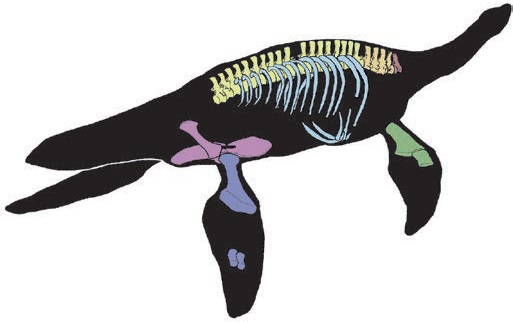
Known elements

The fossils were found by two collectors, António Silva (1999) and Vítor Teixeira (2012) who donated them to the Lourinhã Museum in 2017, and were completely prepared in the Dino Parque laboratory.

== Description ==
The Plesiopharos holotype (ML 2302) consists of parts of the fin of the arm (humerus and radius), of the right leg (femur), pelvic girdle (pubis, ilium and ischium) of the thorax (vertebrae, ribs and gastralia) and of the neck (cervical vertebra). It would be an adult animal with an estimated size between 2.5 and 2.8 m.

== Classification ==
Plesiopharos moelensis is classified as a basal member of Plesiosauroidea.

== Paleoenvironment ==
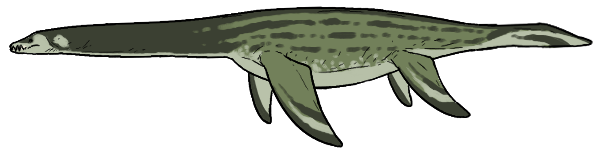
Life restoration

Plesiopharos moelensis was discovered at Praia da Concha, São Pedro de Moel, Marinha Grande, in layers that belong to the Coimbra Formation, which date to the Sinemurian.
