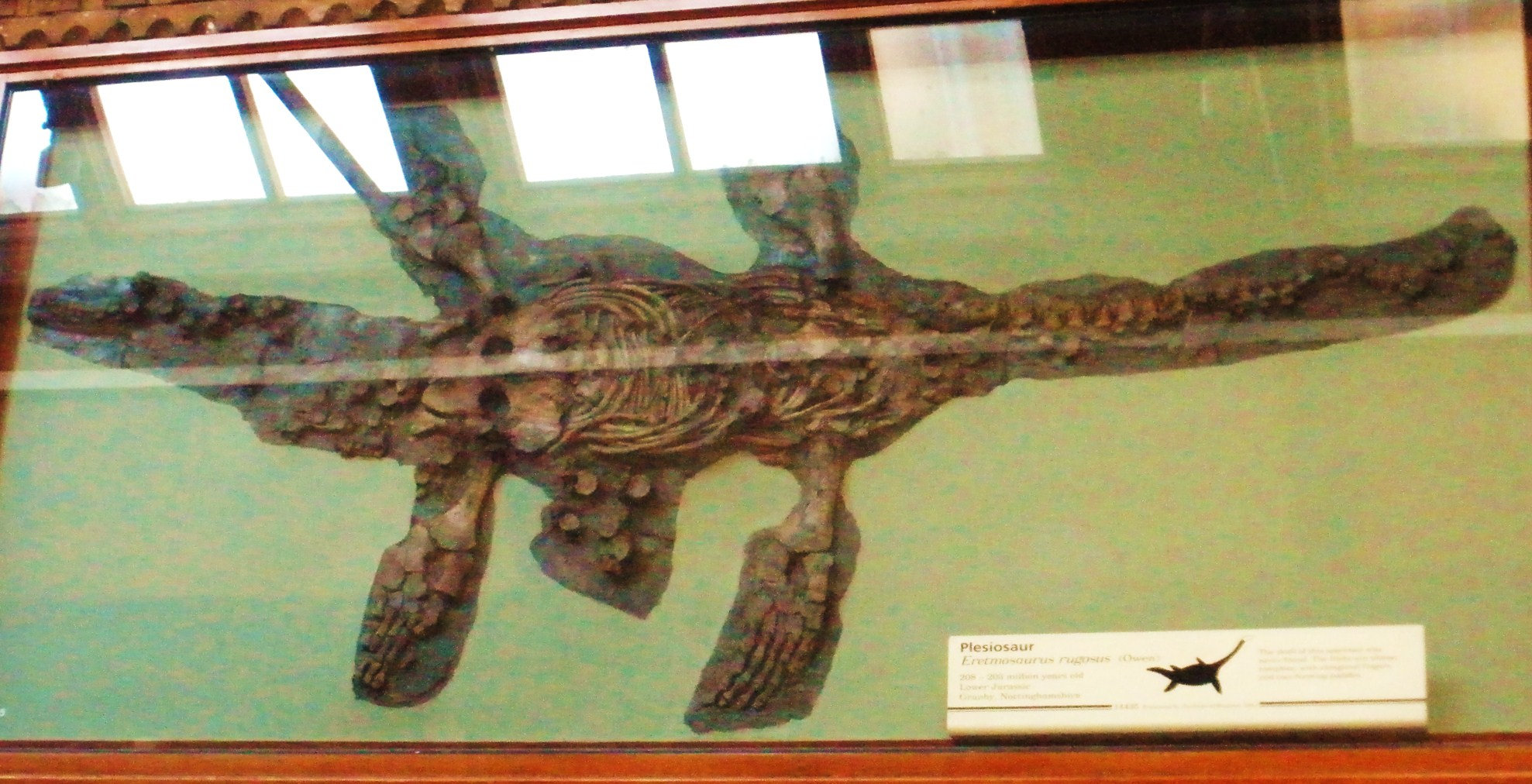
- Neotype specimen of E. rugosus

Scientific classification
- Kingdom: Animalia
- Phylum: Chordata
- Class: Reptilia
- Superorder: †Sauropterygia
- Order: †Plesiosauria
- Superfamily: †Plesiosauroidea
- Family: †Microcleididae
- Genus: †Eretmosaurus; Seeley, 1874

Type species
- †Plesiosaurus rugosus Owen, 1840

Other species
- †E. dubius Blake in Tate & Blake, 1876

Synonyms
- Plesiosaurus dubius Tate & Blake, 1876; Plesiosaurus rugosus Owen, 1840

= Eretmosaurus =

Eretmosaurus Temporal range: Early - Middle Jurassic, 199.5–161.5 Ma

Extinct genus of reptiles

Eretmosaurus (meaning "oar lizard") is an extinct genus of plesiosaur from the Early and Middle Jurassic of England and Russia. Two species are known: E. rugosus and E. dubius.

== History ==
=== Eretmosaurus rugosus ===
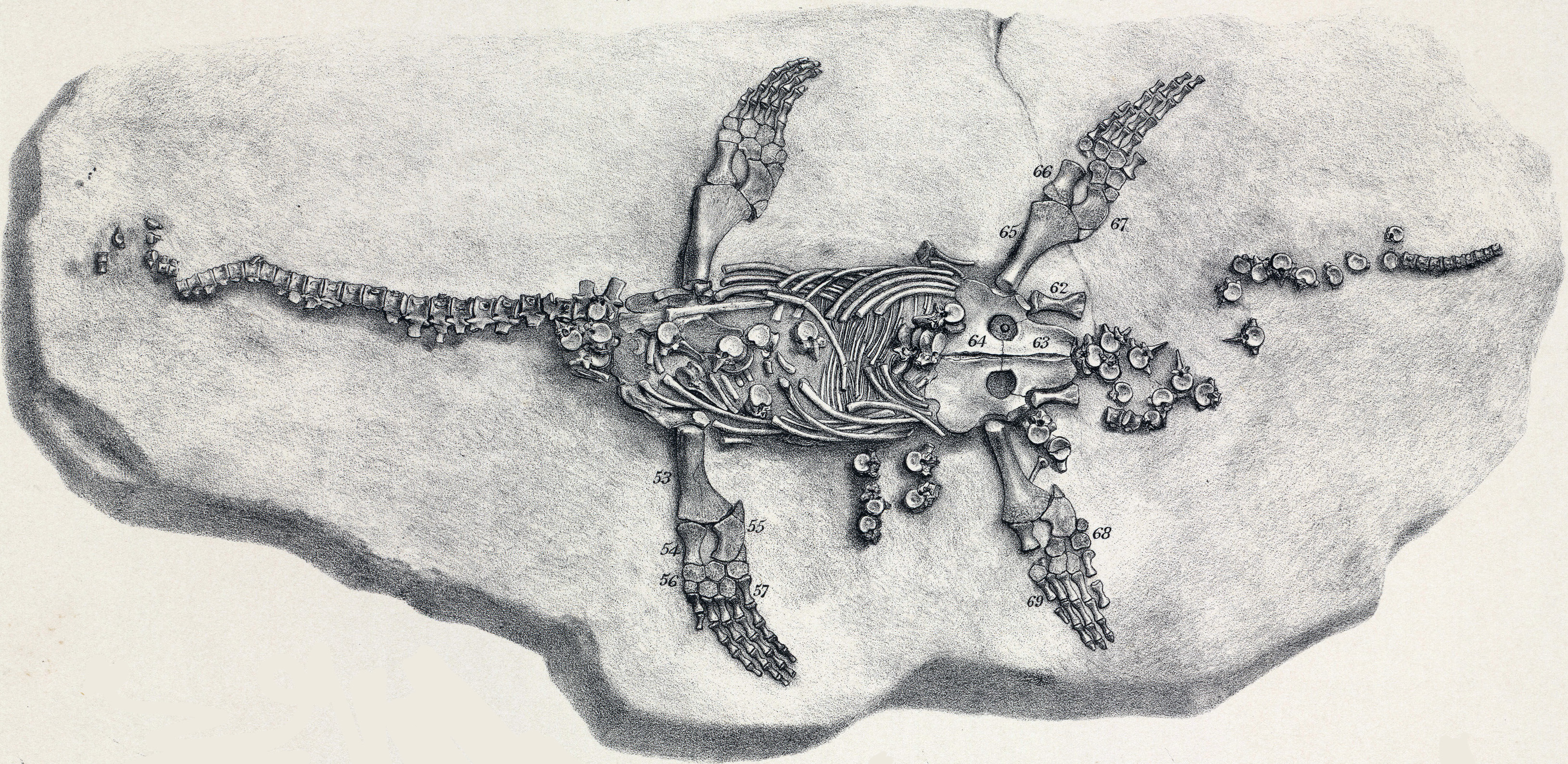
c. 1870 illustration of the neotype of E. rugosus

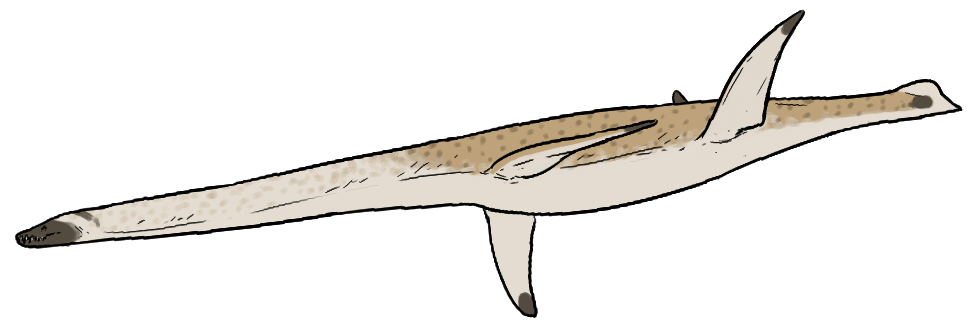
Restoration of E. rugosus

The holotype of E. rugosus has no known recorded specimen number and it consists of vertebrae, girdles, and limb bones discovered in Granby, Nottinghamshire where the Asteroceras obtusum zone of the Lower Lias Formation outcrops.

Specimen BRSMB Cb 2458 was also assigned to the species by Owen (1840). This specimen later became the syntype and it consisted of several vertebrae that had been discovered at different locations in the Blue Lias Formation in Gloucestershire across Aust Cliff.

Owen (1840) was the first to describe the specimens, which were named as Plesiosaurus rugosus. Later, Owen (1865) described a headless skeleton discovered in the Ammonites stellaris zone of the Blue Lias at Granby, Nottinghamshire (NHMUK 14435) that he assigned to P. rugosus, and Seeley used NHMUK 14435 as the basis for naming Eretmosaurus rugosus in 1874.

As BRSMB Cb 2458 was not diagnostic and was lost by 1940, a petition was filed with the ICZN over the holotype by Brown and Bardet (1994), and NHMUK 14435 was allocated as the official neotype in 1996.

A fragmentary specimen of Eretmosaurus rugosus has also been identified from the Middle Jurassic of Siberia by Menner (1992).

=== Eretmosaurus dubius ===
A partial skull and skeleton belonging to a plesiosaur was discovered in the Harpoceras faleifer zone, Whitby, England and it was initially described by Blake & Tate (1876) as a species of Plesiosaurus known as P. dubius. It was later reclassified as a species of Eretmosaurus by Blake in Blake & Tate (1876).

=== Other species ===
Benton and Spencer (1995) mentioned a third species of Eretmosaurus: E. macropterus; they rectified this mistake within the same paper by mentioning on page 116 that E. macropterus actually belongs to Microcleidus.

== Classification ==
Eretmosaurus was classified into Rhomaleosauridae by Persson (1963), then into Pliosauridae by Brown (1981), then into Elasmosauridae by Bardet (1995) and Bardet et al. (1999), and most recently into Microcleididae by Benson et al. (2012).

== See also ==
- List of plesiosaur genera
- Timeline of plesiosaur research
- Jurassic plesiosaurs of Europe
- List of plesiosaurs
