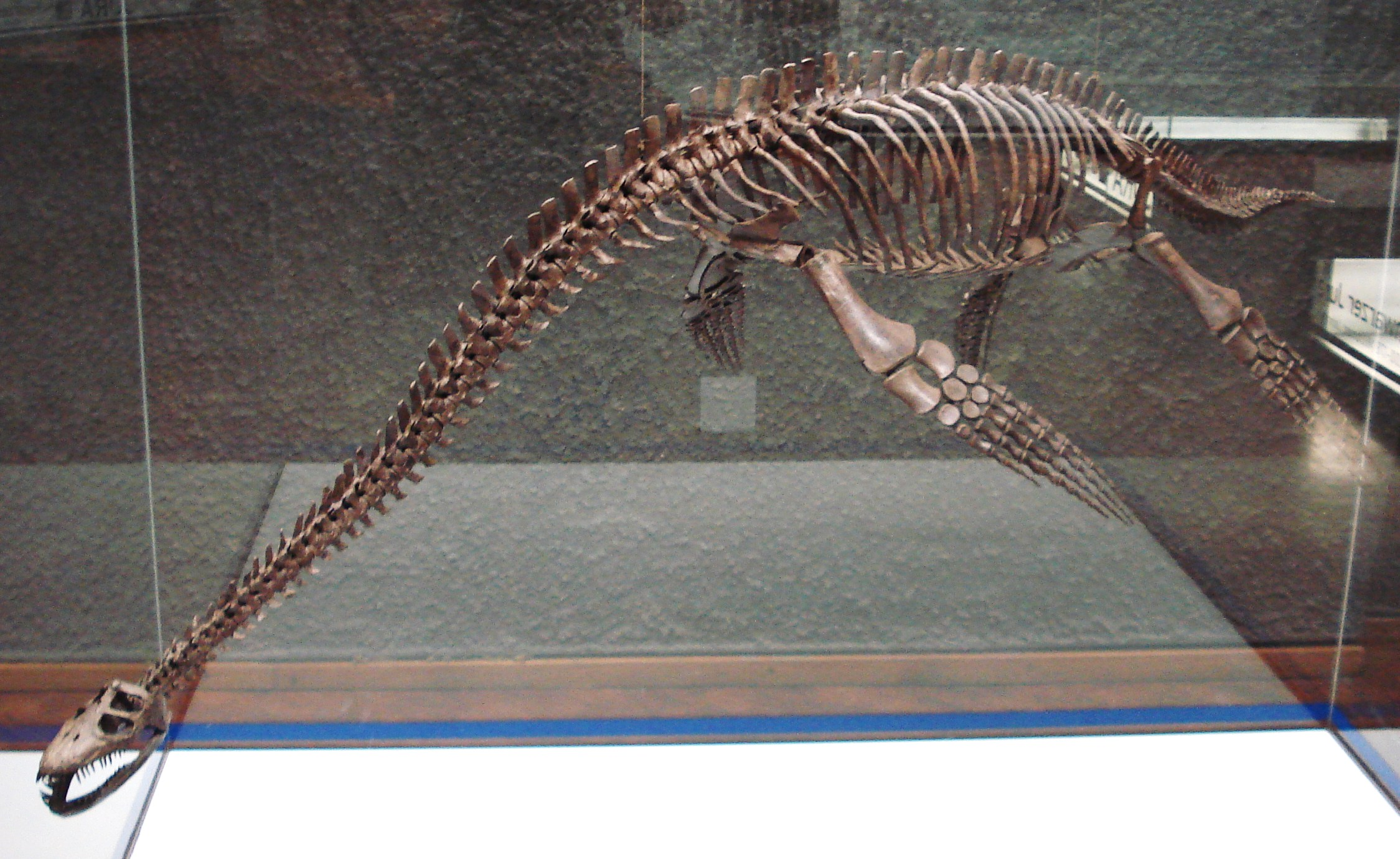
- Skeleton

Scientific classification
- Kingdom: Animalia
- Phylum: Chordata
- Class: Reptilia
- Superorder: †Sauropterygia
- Order: †Plesiosauria
- Superfamily: †Plesiosauroidea
- Genus: †Plesiopterys; O'Keefe, 2004

Type species
- †Plesiopterys wildi O'Keefe, 2004

= Plesiopterys =

Plesiopterys Temporal range: Early Jurassic, 183–182 Ma

Extinct genus of reptiles

Plesiopterys (“plesio” meaning “near,” and “pterys” meaning “wing” or “pterygoid bone”) is an extinct genus of plesiosaur originating from the Posidonienschiefer of Holzmaden, Germany, and lived during the Early Jurassic period. The type and only species is P. wildi, known from two immature specimens with the subadult measuring 3 metres (9.8 ft) long. It possesses a unique combination of both primitive and derived characters, and is currently displayed at the State Museum of Natural History and the Hauff Museum, Germany.

== Discovery and naming ==
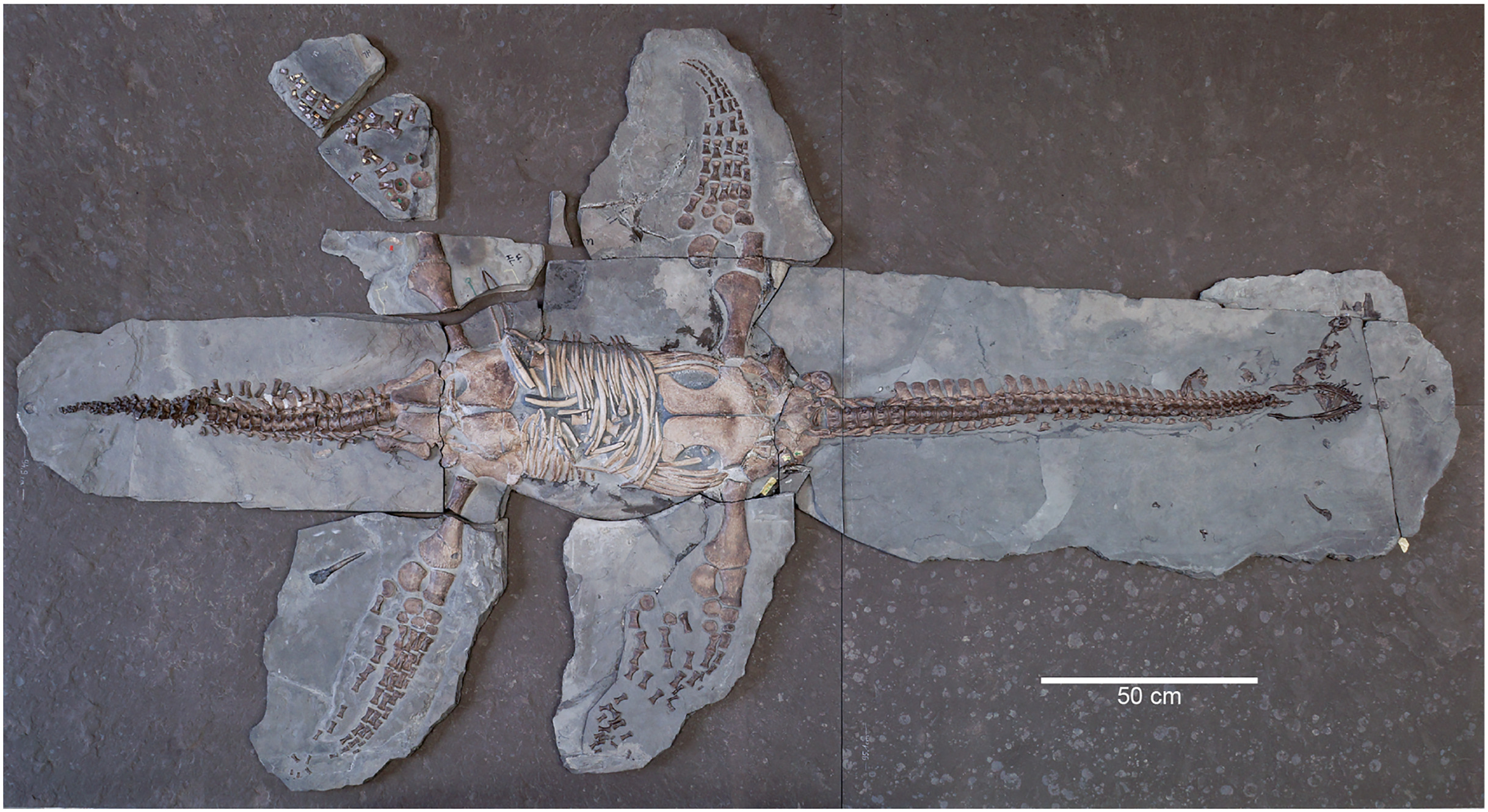
Skeleton of the referred subadult specimen (MH 7)

In 2004, Frank Robin O'Keefe named the species Plesiopterys wildi. The generic name is a combination of Greek plesios, "near", and pterys, "wing", the latter also referring to the pterygoid bones (apart from the fins). The specific name honors the German paleontologist Rupert Wild for his contributions to the Mesozoic vertebrate paleobiology in Germany.

P. wildi is only known from two complete immature specimens: the juvenile holotype and the referred subadult specimen. The holotype (SMNS 16812) is an almost complete juvenile skeleton found and prepared in the nineteenth century. It is mounted in the Staatliches Museum für Naturkunde, Stuttgart, with the damaged skull replaced by a reconstruction. In 2025, a subadult plesiosaur specimen (MH 7) from the Lower Jurassic Posidonia Shale (Germany) was referred to P. wildi.

In 2007, Fransiska Großmann considered Plesiopterys a junior synonym of Seeleyosaurus guilelmiimperatoris. Sachs et al. (2025) has since interpreted Plesiopterys wildi as a taxon distinct from S. guilelmiimperatoris. Marx et al. (2025) also argued that both taxa are separate and that Plesiopterys is valid based on the shared autapomorphies (derived traits) found in SMNS 16812 and MH 7.

== Description ==
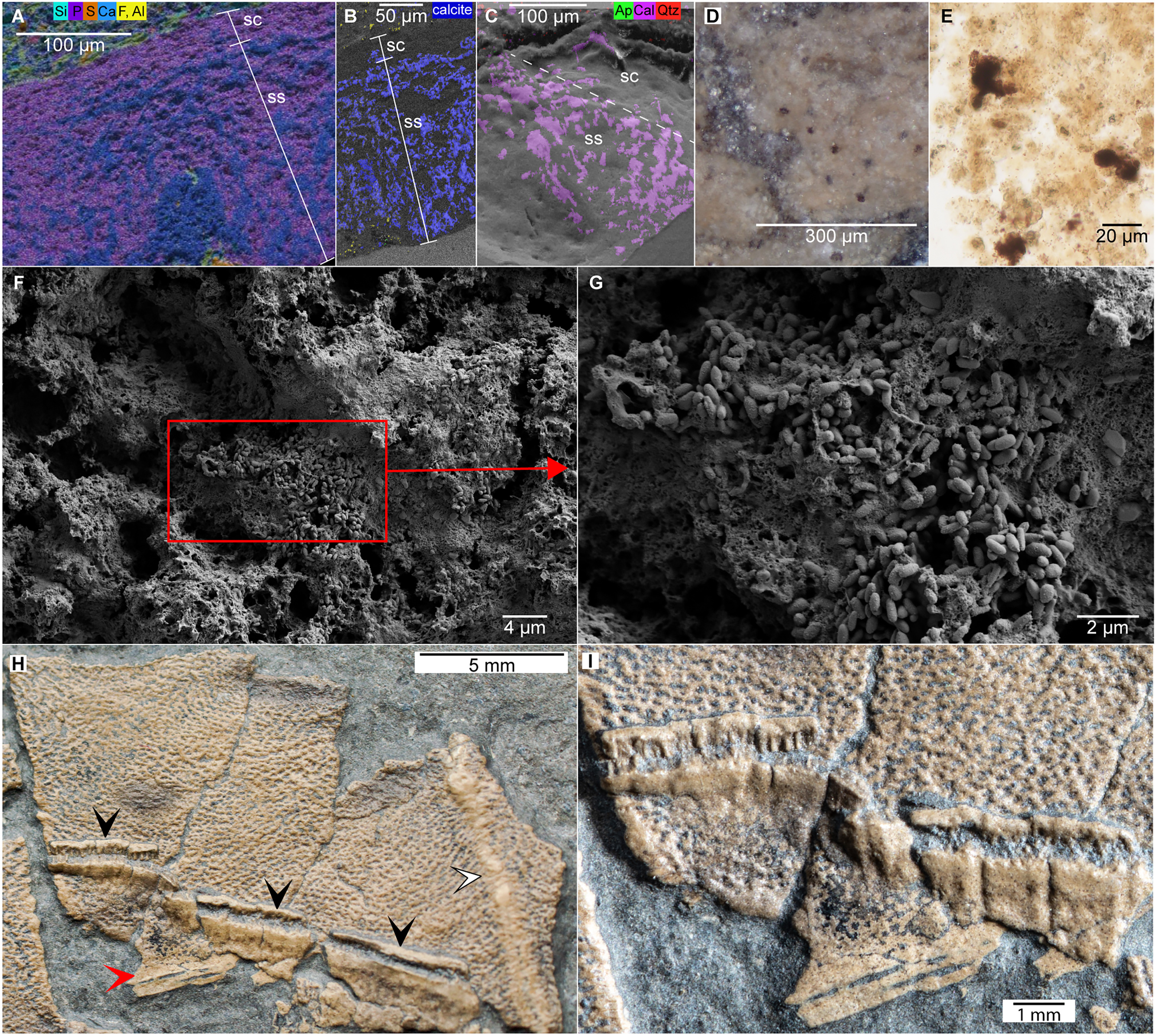
Tail skin of MH 7

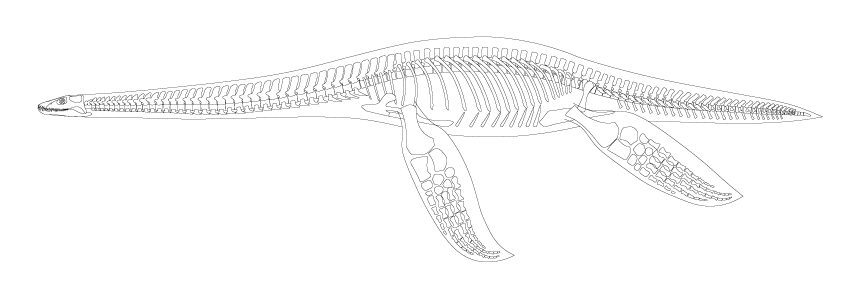
Skeletal diagram

Plesiopterys wildi is a relatively small plesiosaur, with the subadult measuring 3 metres (9.8 ft) long. It had a relatively small head and body, and its limbs and limb girdles are similar in proportion to other plesiosaurs. Plesiopterys had 39 cervical vertebrae, with the neck having general morphology and proportions more similar to Thalassiodracon than to Plesiosaurus. Plesiopterys also has 23 dorsal vertebrae, 3 sacral vertebrae and 41 caudal vertebrae. The holotype had specialized grooves on the dorsal side of the pterygoid for attachment of the internal carotid artery, a feature that is not observed in Plesiosaurus.

The holotype was initially thought to be a young adult due to the visible sutures between the centra and neural arch on the cervical vertebrae and based on the interpretation of the other skeletal elements being ossified. However, the cervical neural spines display a shark fin-shape, a feature also known in the osteologically immature holotype of Brancasaurus, which indicates that the holotype of Plesiopterys is a juvenile.

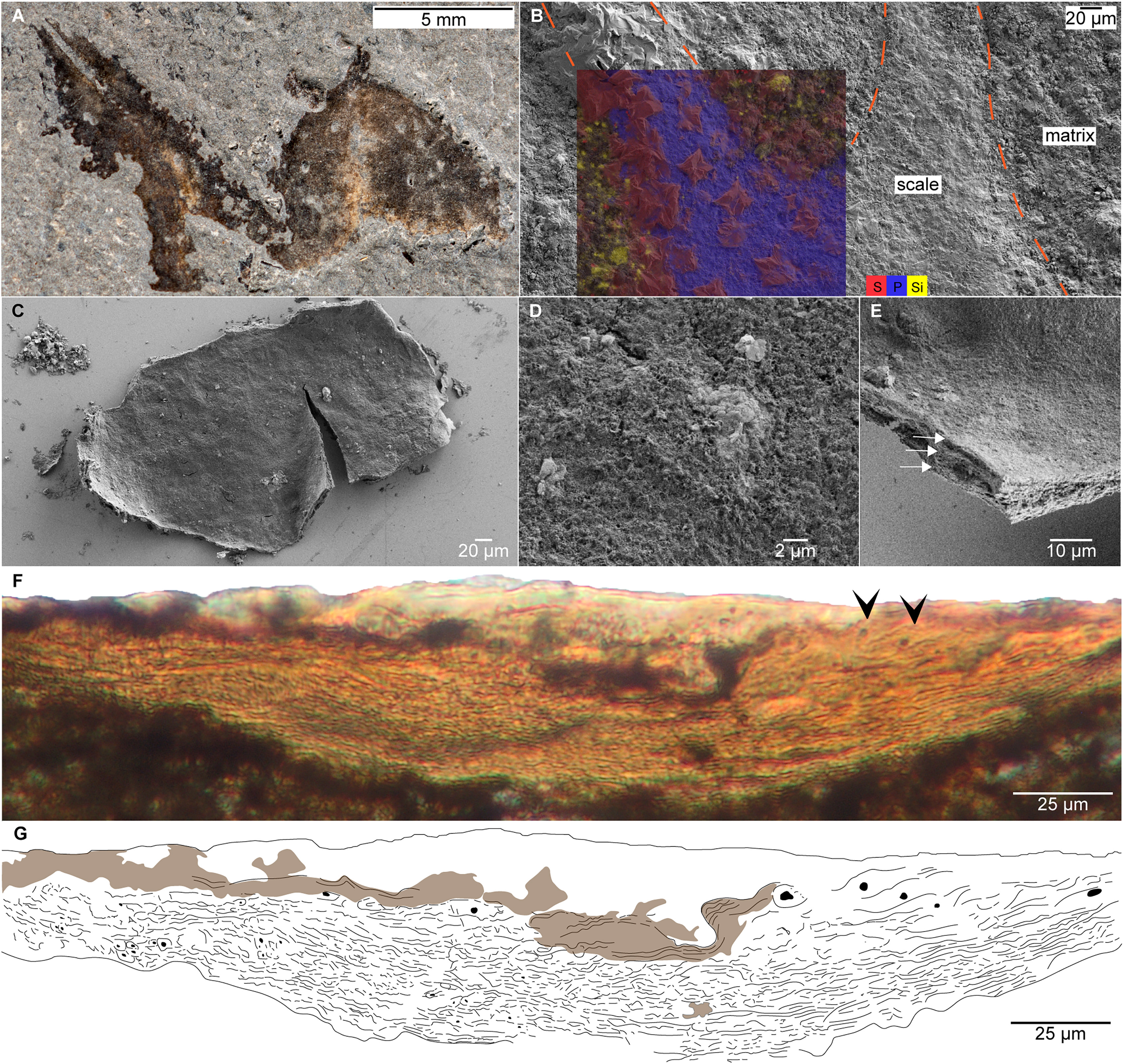
Flipper scales of MH 7

The subadult specimen MH 7 preserves traces of scaly skin on the right front flipper and smooth skin on the tail, with the tail integument also showing preservation of dark-colored melanosomes and keratinocytes. This specimen suggests that plesiosaurs retained reptilian scaly skin unlike some Mesozoic marine reptiles like ichthyosaurs and metriorhynchids. The scales might have aided the plesiosaurs during swimming or protected the flippers during feeding on the seafloor.

=== Skull ===
The skull of specimen SMNS 16812, while well preserved, has a rather crushed skull, with multiple skeletal elements having been broken off, rotated, or otherwise obliterated. On the premaxilla, four or five alveoli are present, along with five premaxillary teeth, which is a plesiomorphic feature for plesiosaurs. Its skull is intermediary between the more primitive Thalassiodracon and the more derived Plesiosaurus.

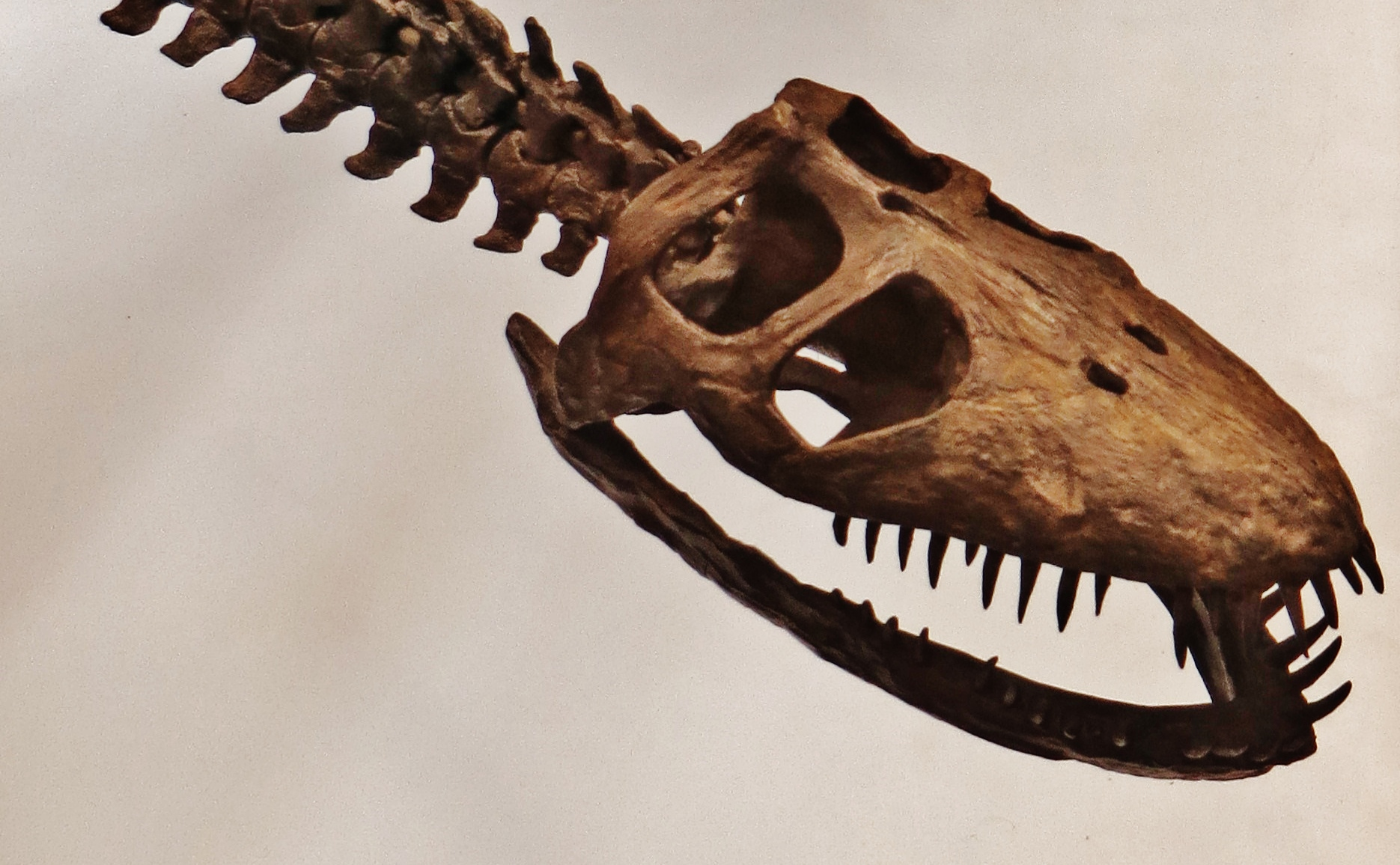
Skull

The pterygoids are unique in that they possess grooves on the dorsal surface, and extend within the posterior interpterygoid vacuities and the pterygoid covering of the ventral surface of the basisphenoid. There has been some debate regarding the interpretations of the location of the suture between the vomer and the pterygoid, but it is most likely located at the anterior end of the anterior interpterygoid vacuity. This anterior interpterygoid vacuity is rather large, and is bigger than those in Thalassiodracon, Rhomaleosaurus, and Leptocleidus. The large anterior interpterygoid vacuity is not a general autapomorphy. The pterygoid possess thin flanges and extend within the posterior interpterygoid vacuities, and the pterygoid covering of the ventral surface of the basisphenoid. Furthermore, there is no visible suture between the flanges and the quadrate rami of the pterygoids. Dorsally, the thin pterygoid surface displays paired grooves that are oriented posterolateral to anteromedial. This feature is unlike those seen in any known plesiosaur, and is similar to the closed palate on nothosaurs. The cultriform process of the parasphenoid divides the pterygoids, extending towards the posterior end of the anterior interpterygoid vacuity, and is rather narrow. Unlike other early plesiosaurs, there is no evidence of a structure for articulation for a quadrate, but that may be due to degradation.

The mandible retains a prominent mandibular ridge, unlike the rest of plesiosaurids, which have lost the feature. Akin to Plesiosaurus, Plesiopterys has a simple and unreinforced lower jaw symphysis. Unfortunately, the rest of the mandibular elements of SMNS 16812 are too crushed to identify, so no further significant features could be identified.

The braincase of SMNS 16812 is similarly obstructed, being dislocated from the rest of the skull. However, the exoccipital/opisthotics, basioccipital, and the supraoccipital elements are similar to that seen in Thalassiodracon.

== Classification ==
Plesiopterys wildi is a member of the clade Plesiosauroidea. Phylogenetic analyses have recovered Plesiopterys as a sister taxon of the genus Franconiasaurus and the clade Cryptoclidia, in a more derived position than the family Microcleididae.

== Paleoenvironment ==
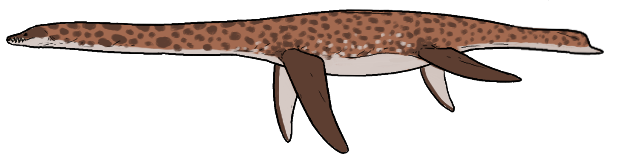
Life restoration

Specimens of Plesiopterys are discovered from the Lower Jurassic (Toarcian) Posidonia Shale of Germany. This area is well known for fossil finds of sauropterygians, and is divided into four main zones: Suebian-Franconian, Yorkshire, Luxembourgian, and Norman. The zonation of the area can be used to interpret the distribution of plesiosaurs from the Early Jurassic, as each species is sorted into their respective zones.

The Posidonienshifer, also known as the Posidonia Shale, has yielded a great number of specimens, most abundantly ichthyosaurs and plesiosaurians. Plesiopterys wildi is accompanied by a few other taxa found in the Holzmaden area, including M. brachypterygius and Hauffiosaurus.

== See also ==
- List of plesiosaur genera
- Timeline of plesiosaur research
