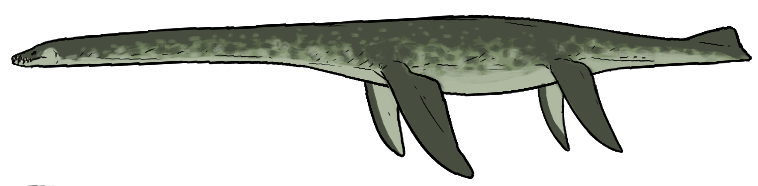
- Life restoration

Scientific classification
- Kingdom: Animalia
- Phylum: Chordata
- Class: Reptilia
- Superorder: †Sauropterygia
- Order: †Plesiosauria
- Superfamily: †Plesiosauroidea
- Genus: †Westphaliasaurus; Schwermann & Sander, 2011

Type species
- †Westphaliasaurus simonsensii Schwermann & Sander, 2011

= Westphaliasaurus =

Westphaliasaurus Temporal range: Early Jurassic, Pliensbachian

Extinct genus of reptiles

Westphaliasaurus is an extinct genus of plesiosaur from Lower Jurassic (Pliensbachian stage) deposits of Westphalia, northwestern Germany. It is known from a nearly complete and articulated skeleton missing the skull and about 38% of the upper neck vertebrae.

It was found by Sönke Simonsen, an amateur paleontologist, in 2007 from the Höxter district near Bielefeld, in the east of North Rhine-Westphalia, Germany. Furthermore, it was first named by Leonie Schwermann and Martin Sander in 2011 and the type species is Westphaliasaurus simonsensii. The generic name is derived from the latinized name for Westfalen, Westphalia and lizard, saurus. The specific name honors Sönke Simonsen. Estimates suggest that it was about 4.5 m (15 ft) long.

== See also ==
- List of plesiosaur genera
- Timeline of plesiosaur research
