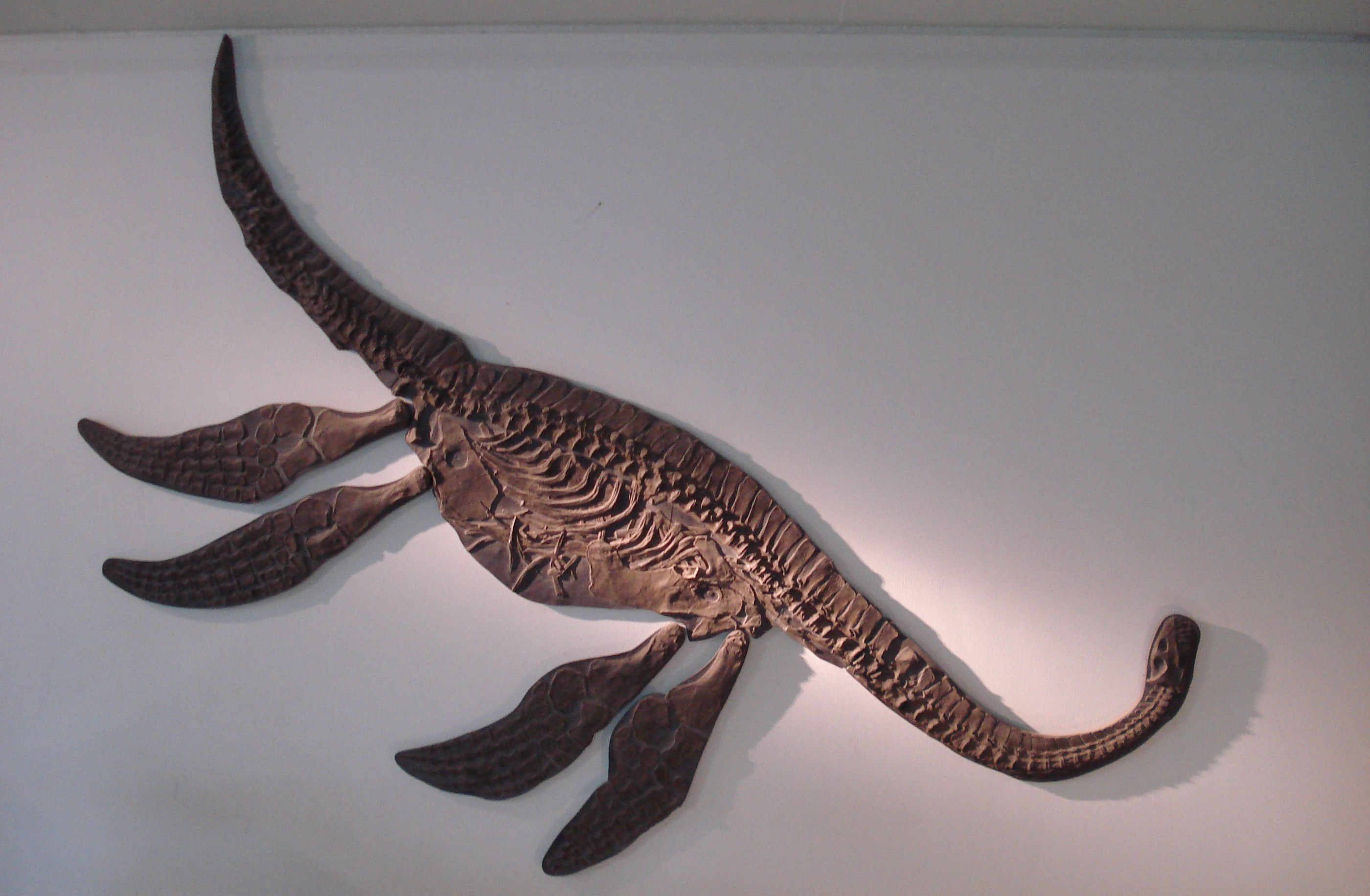
- Cast of Seeleyosaurus guilelmiimperatoris fossil with reconstructed parts based on the holotype

Scientific classification
- Kingdom: Animalia
- Phylum: Chordata
- Class: Reptilia
- Superorder: †Sauropterygia
- Order: †Plesiosauria
- Superfamily: †Plesiosauroidea
- Family: †Microcleididae
- Genus: †Seeleyosaurus; White, 1940

Type species
- †Seeleyosaurus guilelmiimperatoris (Dames, 1895)

Synonyms
- Microcleidus guilelmi imperatoris Menner, 1992; Plesiosaurus guilelmi imperatoris Fraas, 1910 non Dames, 1895; Plesiosaurus imperatoris guilelmi Menner, 1992; Plesiosaurus guilelmiimperatoris Dames, 1895; Seeleyosaurus holzmadensis White, 1940

= Seeleyosaurus =

Seeleyosaurus Temporal range: Early Jurassic, Toarcian

Genus of reptiles (fossil)

Seeleyosaurus is an extinct genus of plesiosaur from Germany and possibly also Russia.

Two species were known: the type, S. guilelmiimperatoris, and the now obsolete species S. holzmadensis, which has since been absorbed into S. guilelmiimperatoris.

== Discovery and naming ==
The holotype is MB.R.1992, a large almost complete skeleton from the Upper Lias (Toarcian) Lias Group Formations of Württemberg, Germany. It was offered for sale by Bernard Hauff and it was purchased by the State Museum of Natural History Stuttgart in August 1893. It preserved soft tissue that was painted over around ten years later and a cast of the holotype was described in by Ketchum & Benson (2011), who determined that it seems to preserve the impression of a rhomboidal flap of skin in a vertical plane, suggesting that many other plesiosaurs may have been equipped in this way. The holotype was destroyed in 1945.

Seeleyosaurus was initially described as Plesiosaurus guilelmiimperatoris by Dames (1895) before White (1940) moved P. guilelmiimperatoris to its own genus. White (1940) also assigned a second species to Seeleyosaurus as S. holzmadensis which was later determined to be the same animal as S. guilelmiimperatoris.

A second specimen (SMNS 12039), preserved in 3D, was initially the holotype of S. holzmadensis. It was discovered within a chalkstone and shale quarry located between Holzmaden and Zell unter Aichelberg, and it intersected an extremely hard forty centimetres thick layer of Stinkstein chalk, which was deemed worthless. The rocks were dumped in a ravine and the holotype was discovered there in November 1906 by fossil trader Bernhard Hauff. Alongside the holotype of Meyerasaurus victor, it was offered for sale, and financial support by D. Landauer and Victor Fraas allowed the Stuttgarter Königliche Naturalienkabinett to obtain both specimens.

A fragmentary specimen of Seeleyosaurus guilelmiimperatoris has also been identified from the Middle Jurassic of Siberia by Menner (1992).

== Description ==
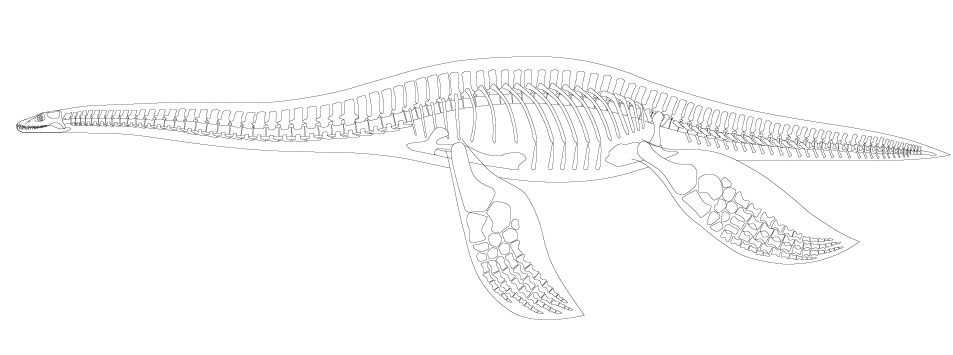
Skeletal diagram

Seeleyosaurus was a relatively small plesiosaur, measuring 2.88–3.66 metres (9.4–12.0 ft) long and weighing 199 kilograms (439 lb).

== Classification ==
The following cladogram follows an analysis by Ketchum & Benson, 2011.

- Pistosauria
  - "Pistosaurus postcranium"
  - - Augustasaurus hagdorni
    - Bobosaurus forojuliensis
    - Pistosaurus
    - Yunguisaurus liae
    - Plesiosauria
      - Pliosauroidea
        - Pliosauridae
          - Thalassiodracon hawkinsii
          - - Hauffiosaurus spp.
            - - Attenborosaurus conybeari
              - advanced pliosaurids
        - Rhomaleosauridae
          - Anningasaura lymense
          - - advanced rhomaleosaurids
            - - "Plesiosaurus" macrocephalus
              - - Archaeonectrus rostratus
                - Macroplata tenuiceps
      - Plesiosauroidea
        - Stratesaurus taylori
        - - Plesiosauridae
            - Seeleyosaurus guilelmiimperatoris
            - - OUMNH J.28585
              - Plesiosaurus dolichodeirus
          - - Elasmosauridae and Cryptoclidia
            - - Microcleidus homalospondylus
              - - Hydrorion brachypterygius
                - Occitanosaurus tournemiensis

A redescription and a study on the affinities of Seeleyosaurus guilelmiimperatoris published by Sachs et al. (2025) interpreted Plesiopterys wildi as a taxon distinct from S. guilelmiimperatoris.

== Gallery ==
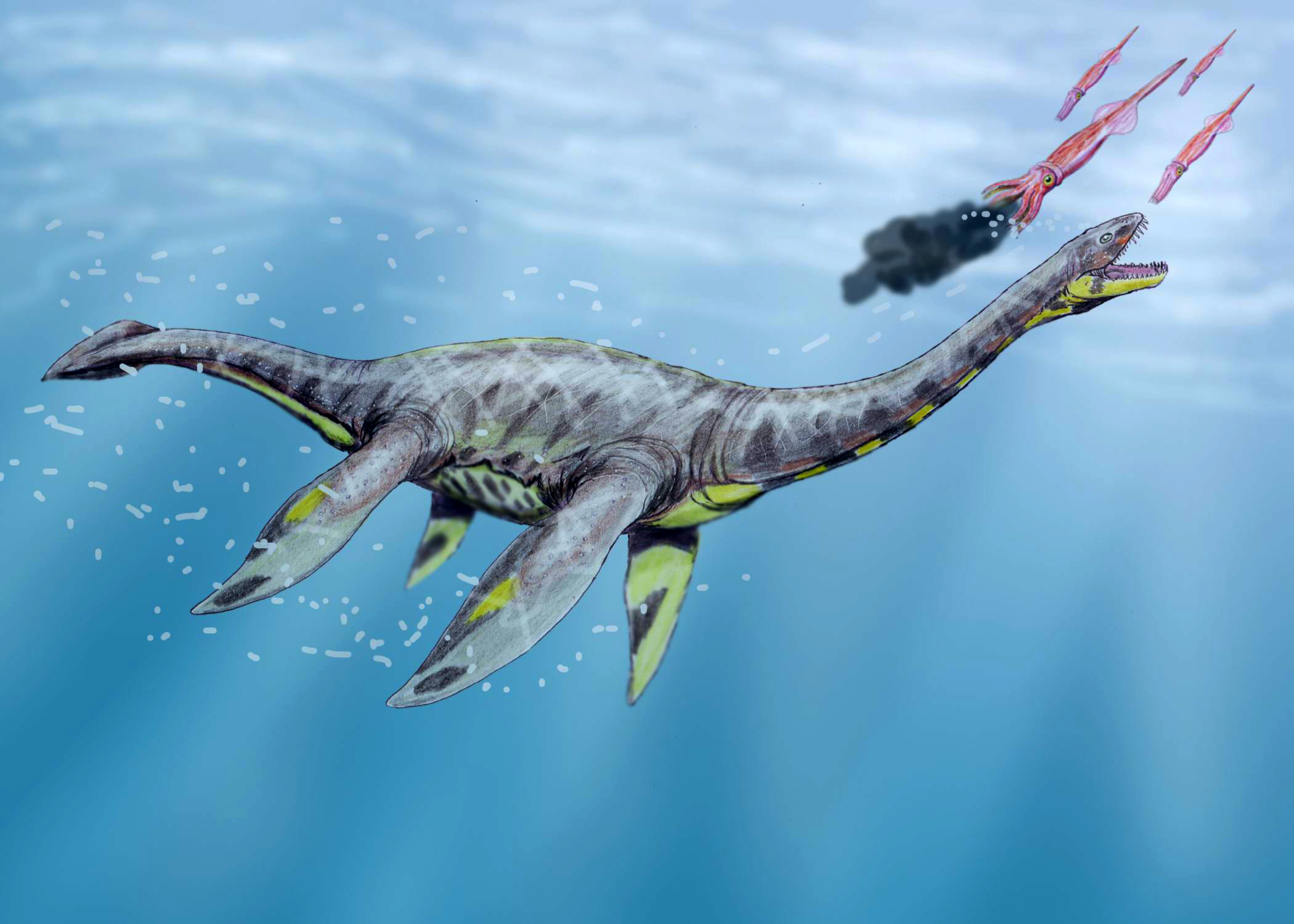
Restoration

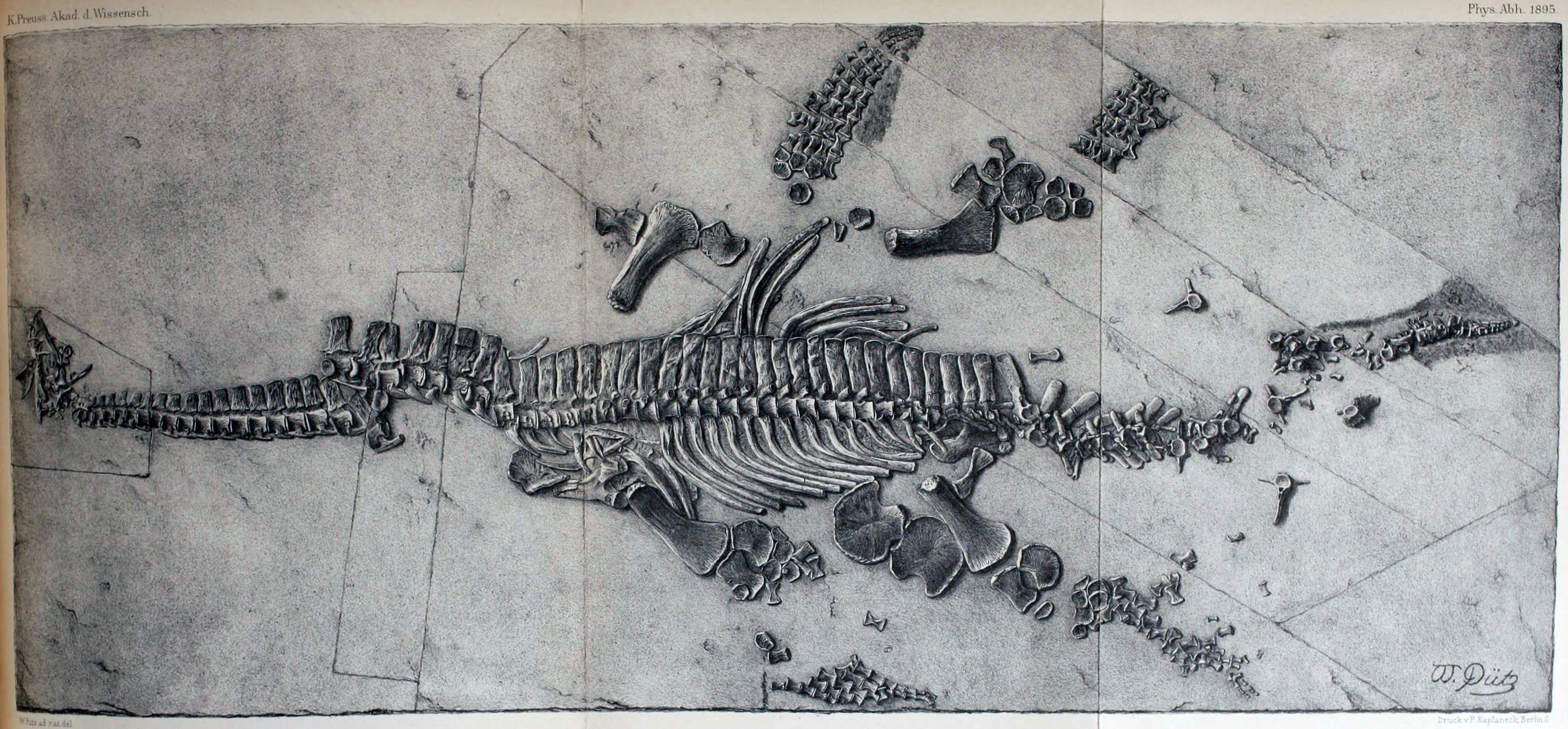
Holotype of S. guilelmiimperatoris in 1895

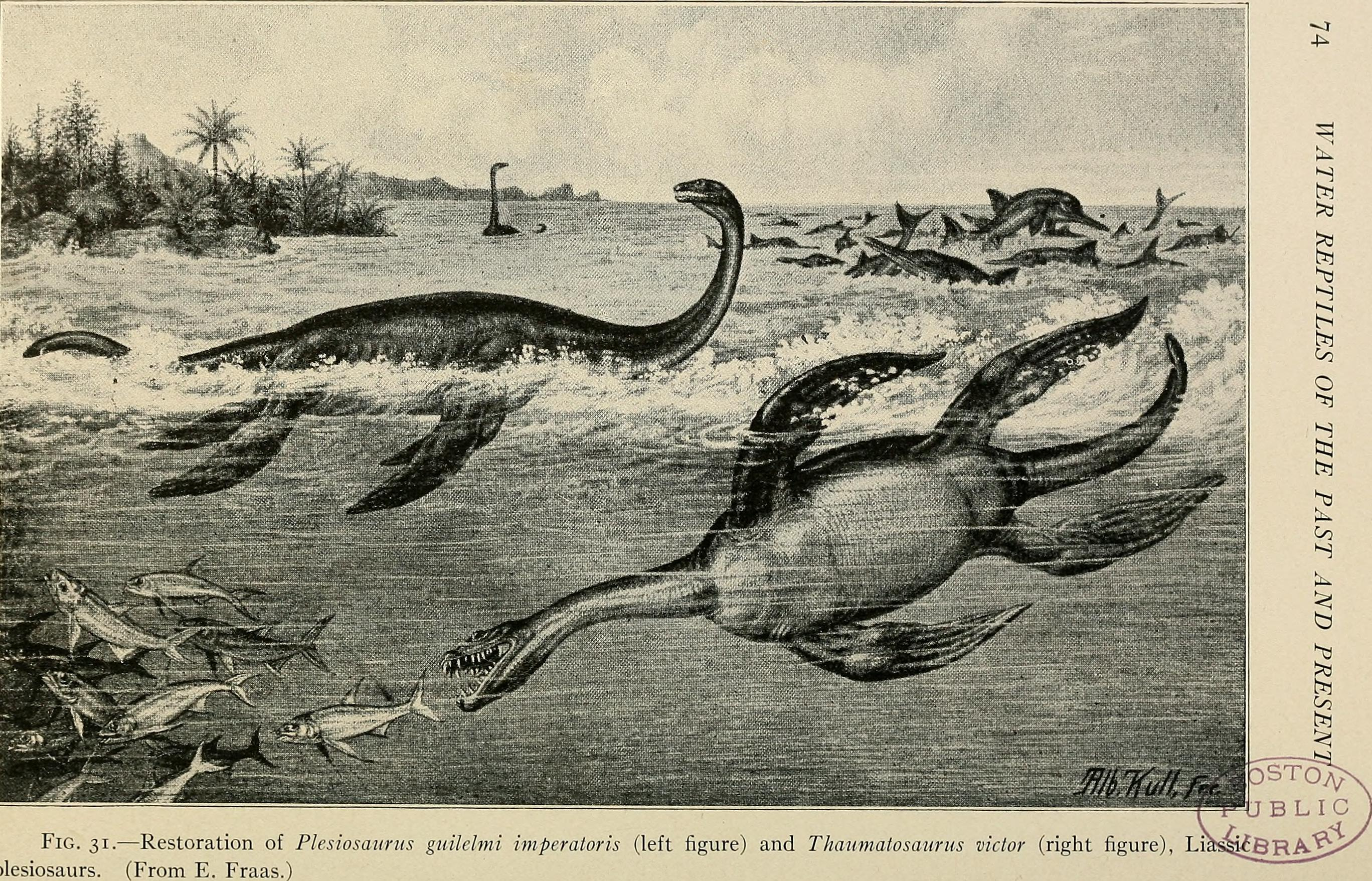
Seeleyosaurus (left) and Thaumatosaurus, now Meyerasaurus (right) as depicted in Water reptiles of the past and present (1914)

== See also ==
- List of plesiosaur genera
- Timeline of plesiosaur research
