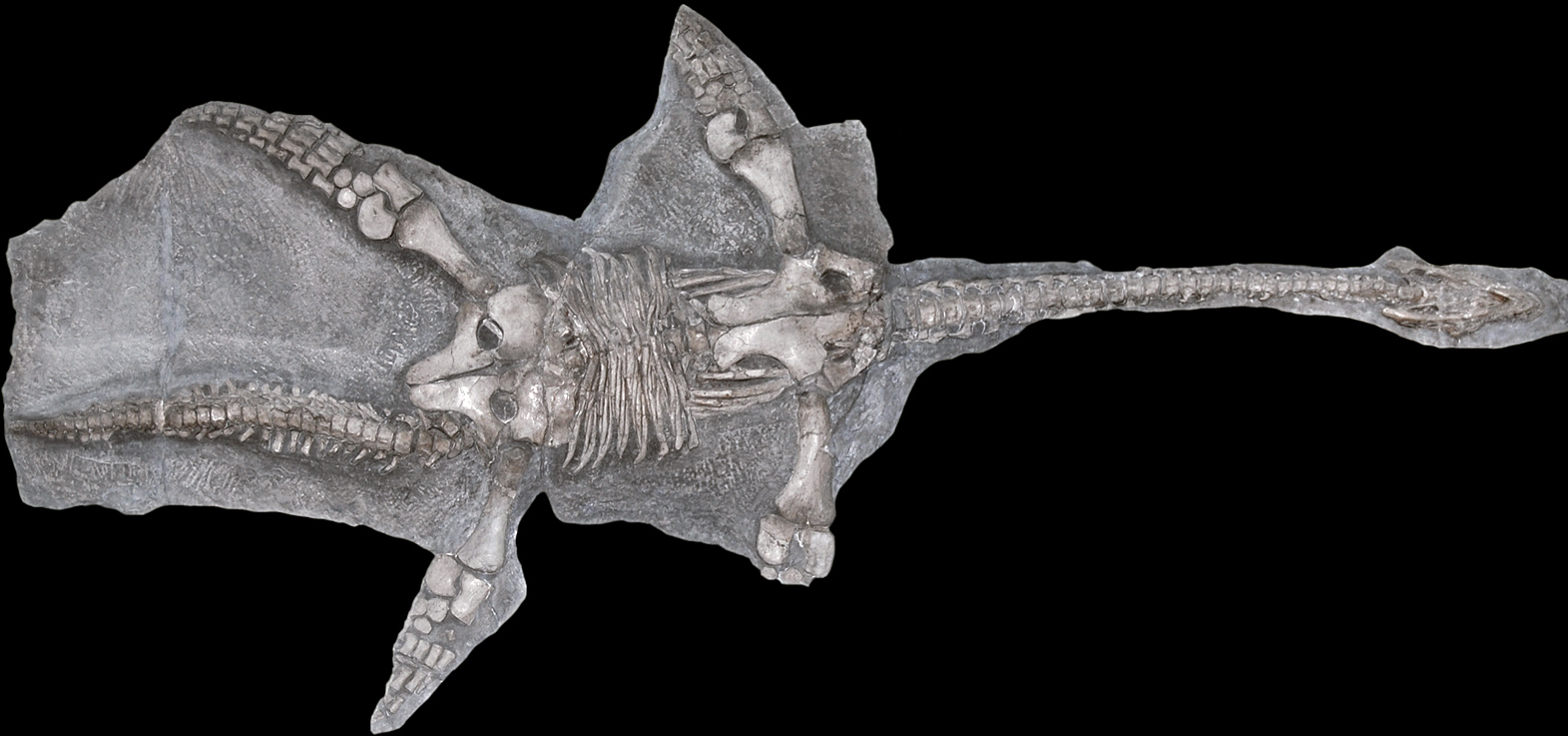
- Lectotype specimen NHMUK PV OR 2018, found in the Lower Lias strata, Street, Somerset, England.

Scientific classification
- Kingdom: Animalia
- Phylum: Chordata
- Class: Reptilia
- Superorder: †Sauropterygia
- Order: †Plesiosauria
- Suborder: †Pliosauroidea
- Family: †Pliosauridae
- Genus: †Thalassiodracon; Storrs & Taylor, 1996
- Species: †T. hawkinsii

Binomial name
- †Thalassiodracon hawkinsii (Owen, 1838)

Synonyms
- Plesiosaurus hawkinsii Owen, 1838

= Thalassiodracon =

Thalassiodracon Temporal range: Rhaetian - Hettangian

Extinct genus of reptiles

Thalassiodracon (tha-LAS-ee-o-DRAY-kon) is an extinct genus of plesiosauroid from the Pliosauridae that was alive during the Late Triassic-Early Jurassic (Rhaetian-Hettangian) and is known exclusively from the Lower Lias of England. The type and only species, is Thalassiodracon (Plesiosaurus) hawkinsii (Owen, 1838).

== Discovery and naming ==
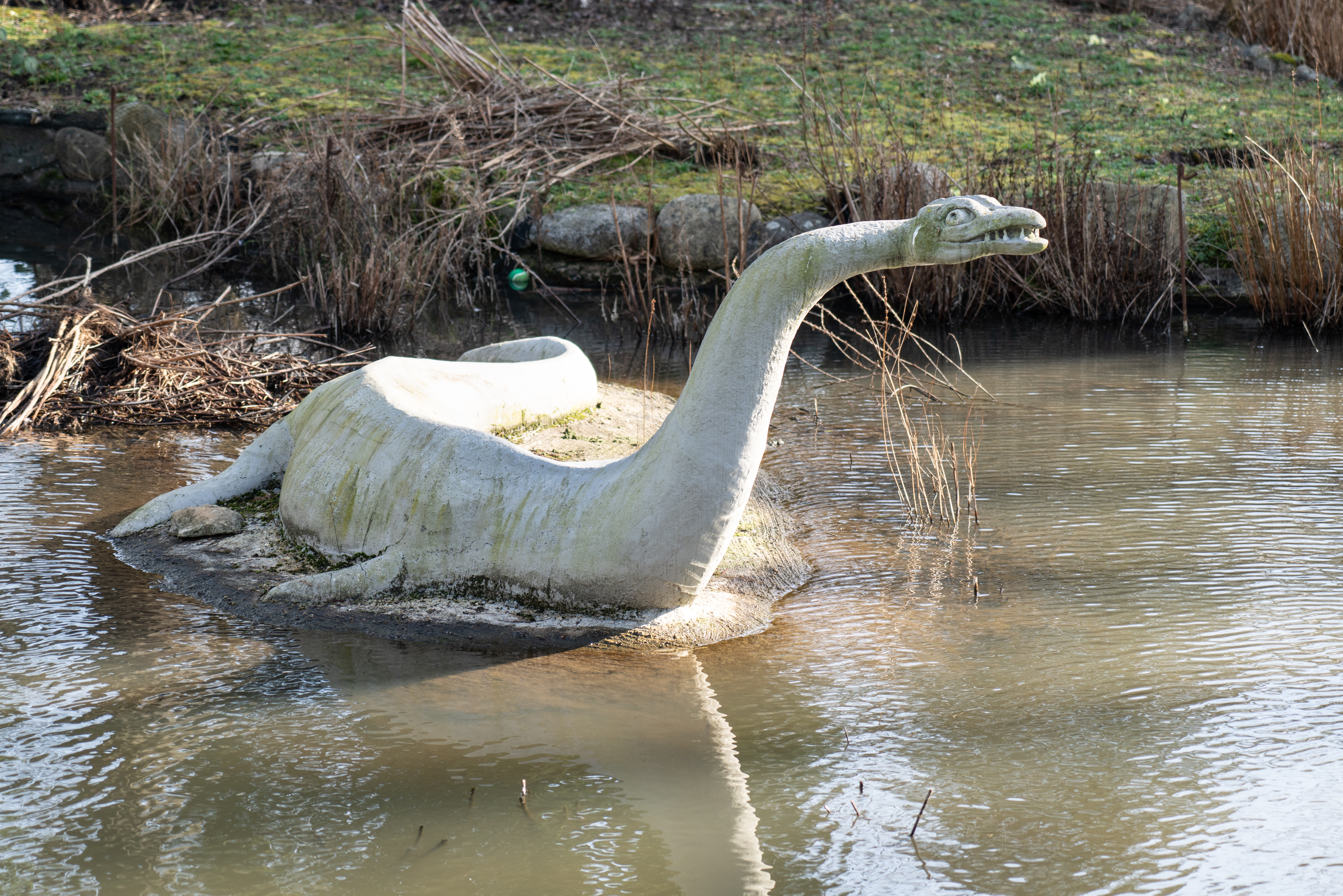
Sculpture in Crystal Palace Park

Thalassiodracon hawkinsii is known from a number of complete skeletons (lectotype: NHMUK PV OR 2018) acquired by the fossil collector Thomas Hawkins in Somerset, England during the early 1830s, before 1834. Hawkins, an eccentric Pre-Adamite who had his fossils heavily restored and illustrated by distinguished artists in expensive editions to propagate his ideas, named these Plesiosaurus triotarsostinus in 1834 and Hezatarostinus in 1840 but these names are generally disregarded. In Memoirs of Icthyosaurii and Plesiosaurii (1835) and The Book of the Great Sea Dragons (1840), Hawkins published his own illustrations after reconstructing the fossils he had obtained. Some of Hawkins original notes are being stored at the Natural History Museum in London. It was named as Plesiosaurus Hawkinsii in 1838 by Richard Owen and it was made the type species of the genus Thalassiodracon in 1996 by Storrs & Taylor.

The original fossil, designated as NHMUK PV OR 2018 was bought by Hawkins in the 1830s, and is currently on display at the Natural History Museum in London, England. A cast of the holotype fossil was created in 1862 by Henry Augustus Ward. This replica was catalogued as LDUCZ-X227 by Ray Lankester and is also located in London, at the Grant Museum of Zoology and Comparative Anatomy. Another cast of Thalassiodracon hawkinsi is being displayed at the Geological Museum of Trinity College in Dublin, Ireland. Three fossils found in Somerset, England originally identified as Thalassiodracon were redescribed as another small plesiosaur, Stratesaurus taylori. According to the Global Biodiversity Information Facility, there is a total of 31 fossil occurrences of Thalassiodracon hawkinsii, all located in the United Kingdom.

The genus name Thalassiodracon means "sea dragon", while the specific name hawkinsii honours Hawkins.

== Description ==
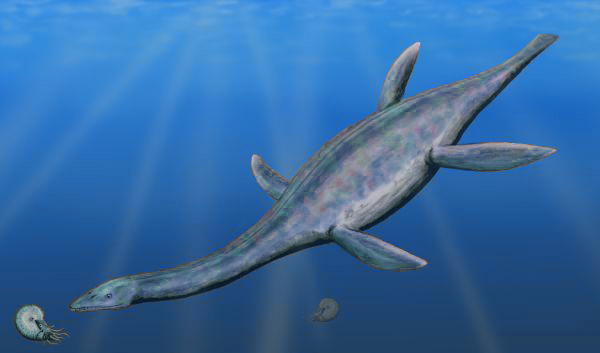
Life restoration

Thalassiodracon was a small plesiosaur in the Late Triassic (Rhaetian) to the Early Jurassic (Hettangian) of Europe (age range: 201.6 to 196.5 million years ago). It measured approximately 1.5 m (4.9 ft) long. It has a skull length of 17 cm (6.7 in), neck length of 75.5 cm (2 ft 5.7 in), and trunk length of 68 cm (2 ft 3 in).

Plesiosaurs lived in both saltwater and freshwater areas, with specific adaptations to help them thrive, with Thalassiodracon hawkinsi being no exception. The neck of Thalassiodracon was slightly shorter than that of subsequent plesiosaurs. The cervical vertebrae were between 27 and 31, while those of Plesiosaurus were 35 - 37. Moreover, the skull was unusually short and equipped with long teeth. The orbits of the skull were enlarged, containing likewise large, flat scleral rings. These rings are theorized to help the eyes of the creature to be well adjusted for a low-light environment found in its habitat. Other features like elongated staples and fused exoccipital bones seem to suggest adapted underwater hearing. Like some modern reptiles, the teeth inside the skull had a constant replacement cycle as they wore out during the animal's lifetime. The cycle appears to have occurred in a wave shaped pattern, with cycle repeating every third tooth.

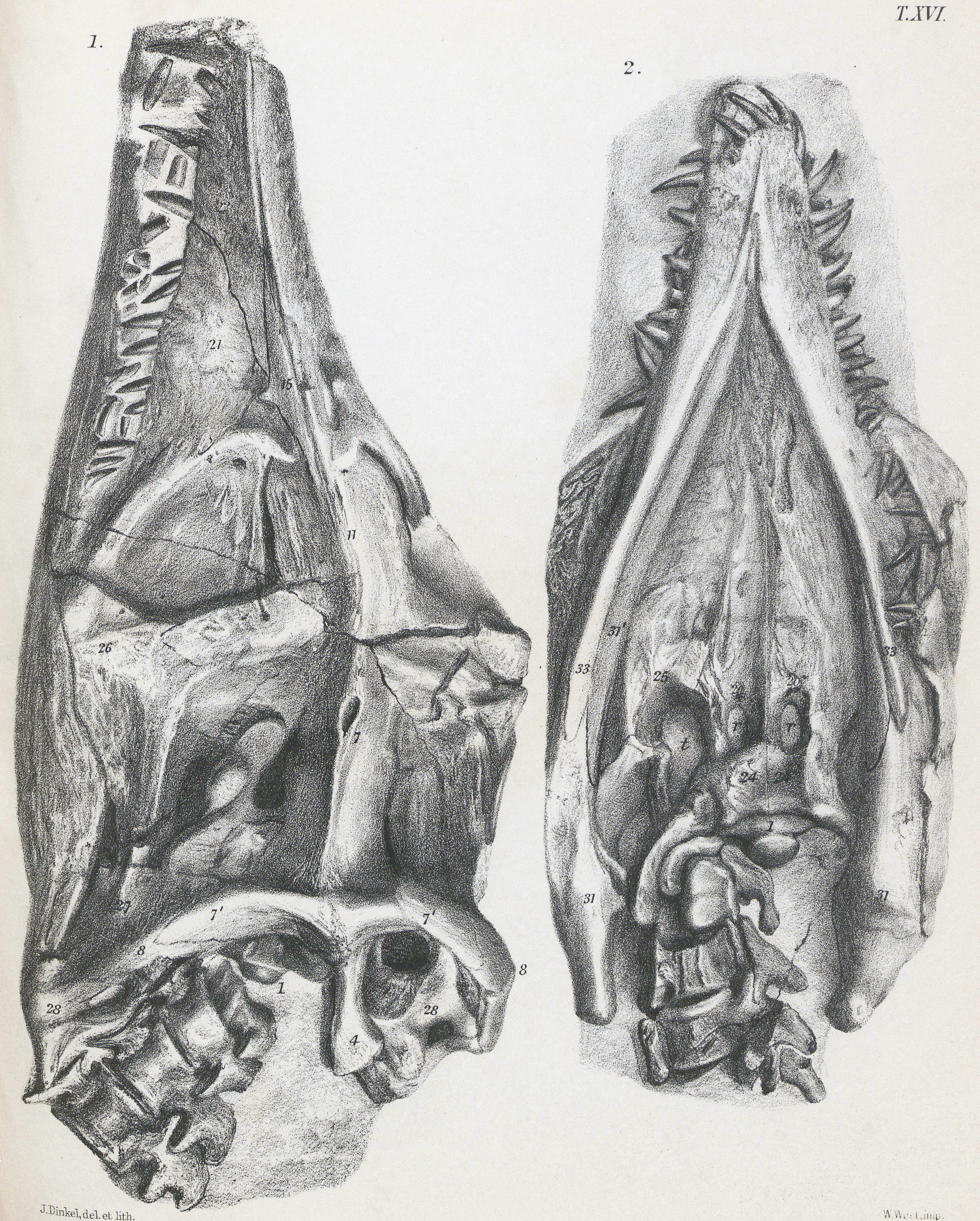
Skull illustration

A computed tomography of an exceptionally preserved skull, and examination of other specimens (Benson et al., 2011) yields new anatomical data. Thalassiodracon had a dorsomedian ridge on the premaxilla, a squamosal bulb, four premaxillary teeth, and a heterodont maxillary dentition.

Like all plesiosaurs, this animal had legs like paddles for swimming in the sea. But, separating them from earlier ancestors, Thalassiodracon and following members also had shortened tails. In adulthood, the forelimbs of Thalassiodracon hawkinsii are shorter than its hindlimbs. Plesiosaurs with this characteristic are speculated to be pursuit predators, using speed and strength to hunt down their prey. In general, plesiosaurs had three primary ways to traverse through the water with their flippers: rowing, flying, and rowing flight. Unlike the reptiles of today, Thalassiodracon hawkinsii and other plesiosaurs were warm-blooded with a high metabolism, enabling them to have an active lifestyle.

All plesiosaurs, including Thalassiodracon were faunivorous, but widely ranged in their diets. Animals such as ammonites, cephalopods, and other invertebrates were often found in plesiosaur remains. With the bones of dinosaurs and pterosaurs being found in plesiosaur remains, these animals are also possibilities for their diets.

Like other plesiosaurs, Thalassiodracon hawkinsii is believed to have been viviparous, meaning it gave birth to live young.

== Classification ==
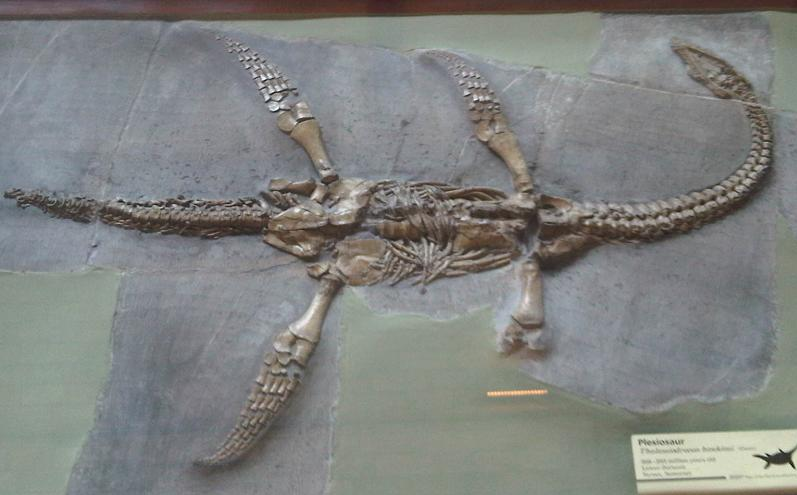
Thalassiodracon hawkinsii skeleton NHMUK PV OR 2020, Natural History Museum in London

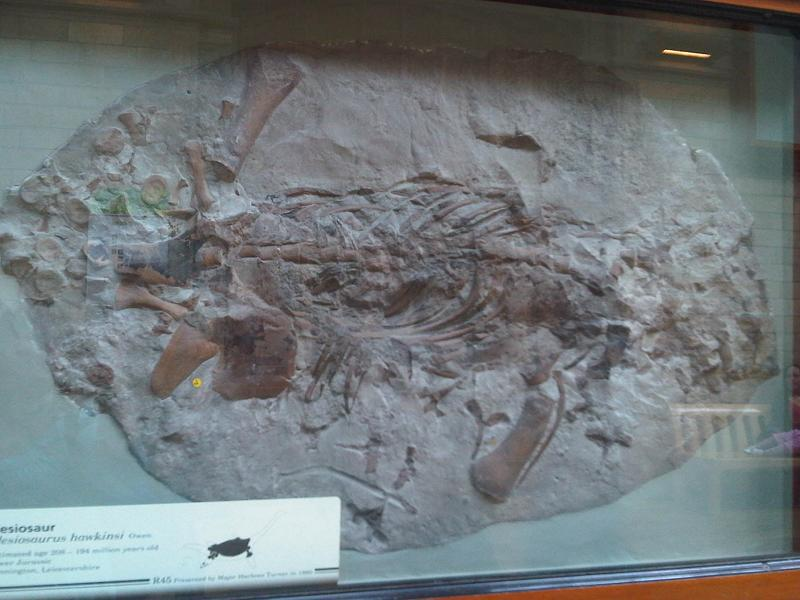
Incomplete specimen (NHMUK PV R45)

Thalassiodracon was originally placed in the genus Plesiosaurus. It has been classified in a new genus Thalassiodracon many years later following an examination of a skull. This animal is considered one of the oldest representatives of the group of plesiosaurs, perhaps ancestral to the superfamily of Pliosauroidea (short-necked plesiosaurs).

The following cladogram follows an analysis by Ketchum & Benson, 2011.

- Pistosauria
  - "Pistosaurus postcranium"
  - - Augustasaurus hagdorni
    - Bobosaurus forojuliensis
    - Pistosaurus
    - Yunguisaurus liae
    - Plesiosauria
      - Pliosauroidea
        - Pliosauridae
          - Thalassiodracon hawkinsii
          - - Hauffiosaurus spp.
            - - Attenborosaurus conybeari
              - advanced pliosaurids
        - Rhomaleosauridae
          - NHMUK 49202 [now Anningasaura lymense]
          - - advanced rhomaleosaurids
            - - "Plesiosaurus" macrocephalus
              - - Archaeonectrus rostratus
                - Macroplata tenuiceps
      - Plesiosauroidea
        - OUMNH J.10337 [now Stratesaurus taylori]
        - - Plesiosauridae
            - Seeleyosaurus guilelmiimperatoris
            - - OUMNH J.28585
              - Plesiosaurus dolichodeirus
          - - Elasmosauridae and Cryptoclidia
            - - Microcleidus homalospondylus
              - - Hydrorion brachypterygius
                - Occitanosaurus tournemiensis

== See also ==
- List of plesiosaur genera
- Timeline of plesiosaur research
