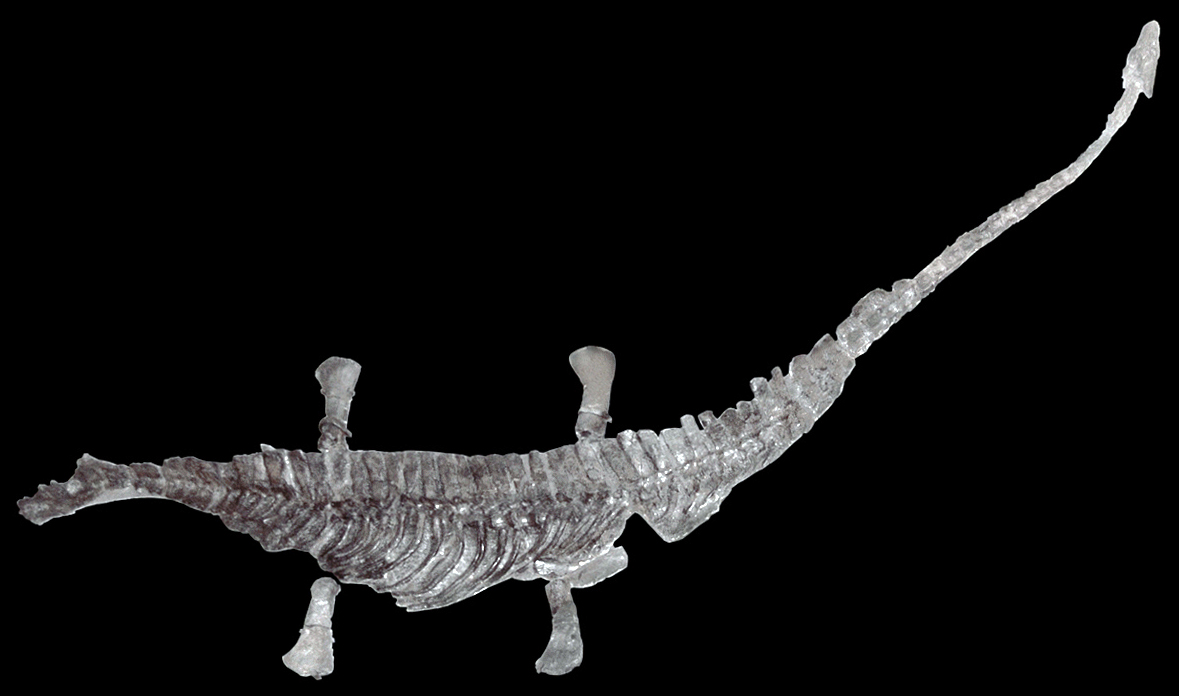
- Fossil M. homalospondylus

Scientific classification
- Kingdom: Animalia
- Phylum: Chordata
- Class: Reptilia
- Superorder: †Sauropterygia
- Order: †Plesiosauria
- Superfamily: †Plesiosauroidea
- Family: †Microcleididae
- Genus: †Microcleidus; Watson, 1909

Type species
- Plesiosaurus homalospondylus (Owen, 1865)

Other species
- M. macropterus (Seeley, 1865); M. tournemirensis (Sciau et al., 1990); M. melusinae Vincent et al., 2019

Synonyms
- M. macropteus: Plesiosaurus macropteus Seeley, 1865; Eretmosaurus macropterus Benton and Spencer, 1995; M. tournemirensis: Plesiosaurus tournemirensis Sciau et al., 1990; Occitanosaurus tournemirensis Bardet et al., 1999

= Microcleidus =

Microcleidus Temporal range: Toarcian ~182–175 Ma

Extinct genus of reptiles

Microcleidus is an extinct genus of sauropterygian reptile belonging to the Plesiosauroidea. The species has 40 neck vertebrae and a short tail of 28 vertebrae. Fossils of the genus have been found in France, the Posidonia Shale in Germany and Luxembourg, and the Alum Shale Formation of England.

== Description ==
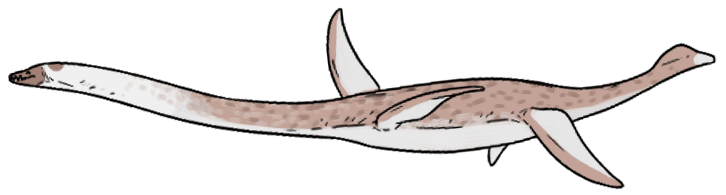
Restoration of M. homalospondylus

The type species, M. homalospondylus, was the largest, measuring 5.1 m (17 ft) long and weighing 650 kg (1,430 lb). Other species were smaller: M. tournemirensis was about 4 m (13 ft) long and weighed 300 kg (660 lb), and M. melusinae was about 3 m (9.8 ft) long and weighed 120 kg (260 lb).

== Classification ==
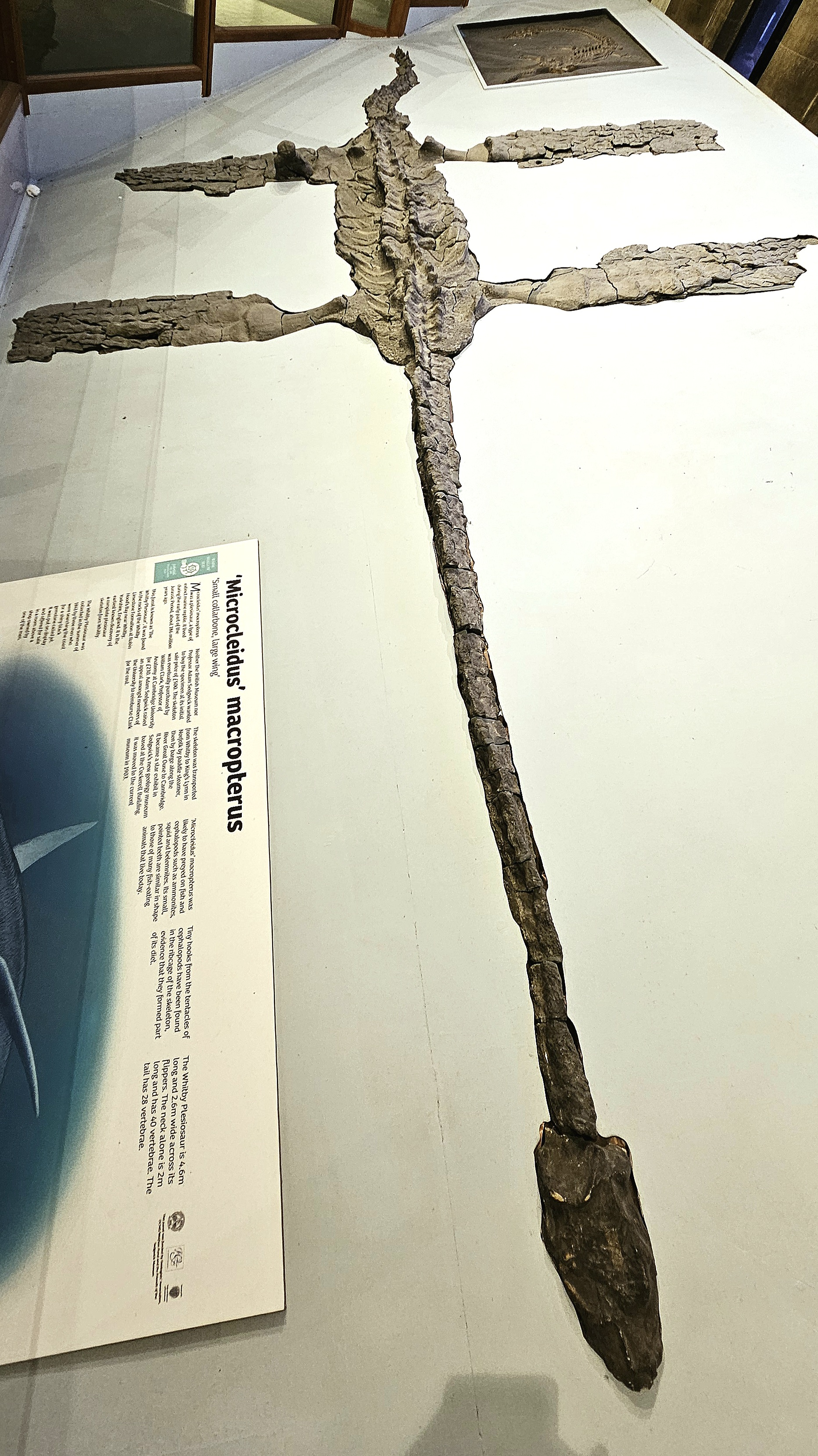
M. macropterus skeleton in Sedgwick Museum

Species include: Microcleidus homalospondylus (Owen 1865) and Microcleidus macropterus (Seeley 1865).

Occitanosaurus tournemirensis (originally "Plesiosaurus" tournemirensis), was named by Sciau et al. in 1990, based on a nearly complete skeleton of an animal approximately 4 meters (13 ft) long. It was later found to be a species of Microcleidus.

The following cladogram follows an analysis by Ketchum & Benson, 2011.

- Pistosauria
  - "Pistosaurus postcranium"
  - - Augustasaurus hagdorni
    - Bobosaurus forojuliensis
    - Pistosaurus
    - Yunguisaurus liae
    - Plesiosauria
      - Pliosauroidea
        - Pliosauridae
          - Thalassiodracon hawkinsii
          - - Hauffiosaurus spp.
            - - Attenborosaurus conybeari
              - advanced pliosaurids
        - Rhomaleosauridae
          - NHMUK OR 49202 [now Anningasaura lymense]
          - - advanced rhomaleosaurids
            - - "Plesiosaurus" macrocephalus
              - - Archaeonectrus rostratus
                - Macroplata tenuiceps
      - Plesiosauroidea
        - OUMNH J.10337 [now Stratesaurus taylori]
        - - Plesiosauridae
            - Seeleyosaurus guilelmiimperatoris
            - - OUMNH J.28585
              - Plesiosaurus dolichodeirus
          - - Elasmosauridae and Cryptoclidia
            - - Microcleidus homalospondylus
              - - Hydrorion brachypterygius
                - Occitanosaurus tournemiensis

== See also ==
- List of plesiosaur genera
- Timeline of plesiosaur research
