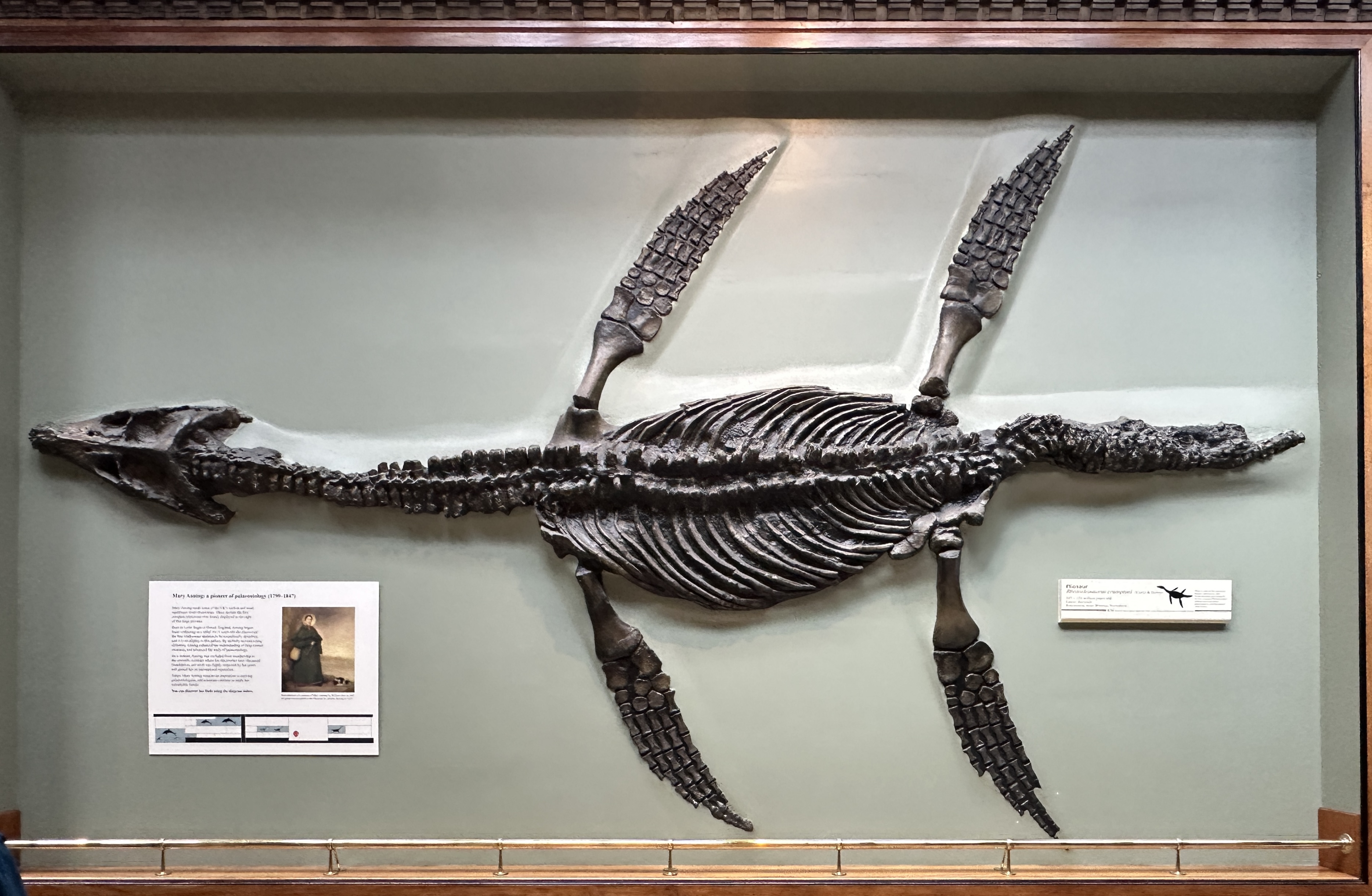
- Rhomaleosaurus cramptoni, specimen NHMUK PV R 34 on display at the Natural History Museum UK, a cast of the Holotype (NMING F 8785).

Scientific classification
- Kingdom: Animalia
- Phylum: Chordata
- Class: Reptilia
- Superorder: †Sauropterygia
- Order: †Plesiosauria
- Family: †Rhomaleosauridae
- Genus: †Rhomaleosaurus; Seeley, 1874

Species
- †R. cramptoni (Carte & Bailey, 1863 [originally Plesiosaurus]) (type); †R. propinquus (Tate & Blake, 1876 [originally Plesiosaurus]); †R. thorntoni Andrews, 1922; †R. zetlandicus Phillips per Anon., 1854

= Rhomaleosaurus =

Rhomaleosaurus Temporal range: Early Jurassic, 208.5–174.1 Ma

Extinct genus of reptiles

Rhomaleosaurus (meaning "strong lizard") is an extinct genus of Early Jurassic (Toarcian age, about 183 to 175.6 million years ago) rhomaleosaurid pliosauroid known from Northamptonshire and from Yorkshire of the United Kingdom. It was first named by Harry Seeley in 1874 and the type species is Rhomaleosaurus cramptoni. It was one of the earliest large marine reptile predators which hunted in the seas of Mesozoic era, measuring about 7 metres (23 ft) long. Like other pliosaurs, Rhomaleosaurus fed on ichthyosaurs, ammonites and other plesiosaurs.

== Species ==
=== R. cramptoni ===
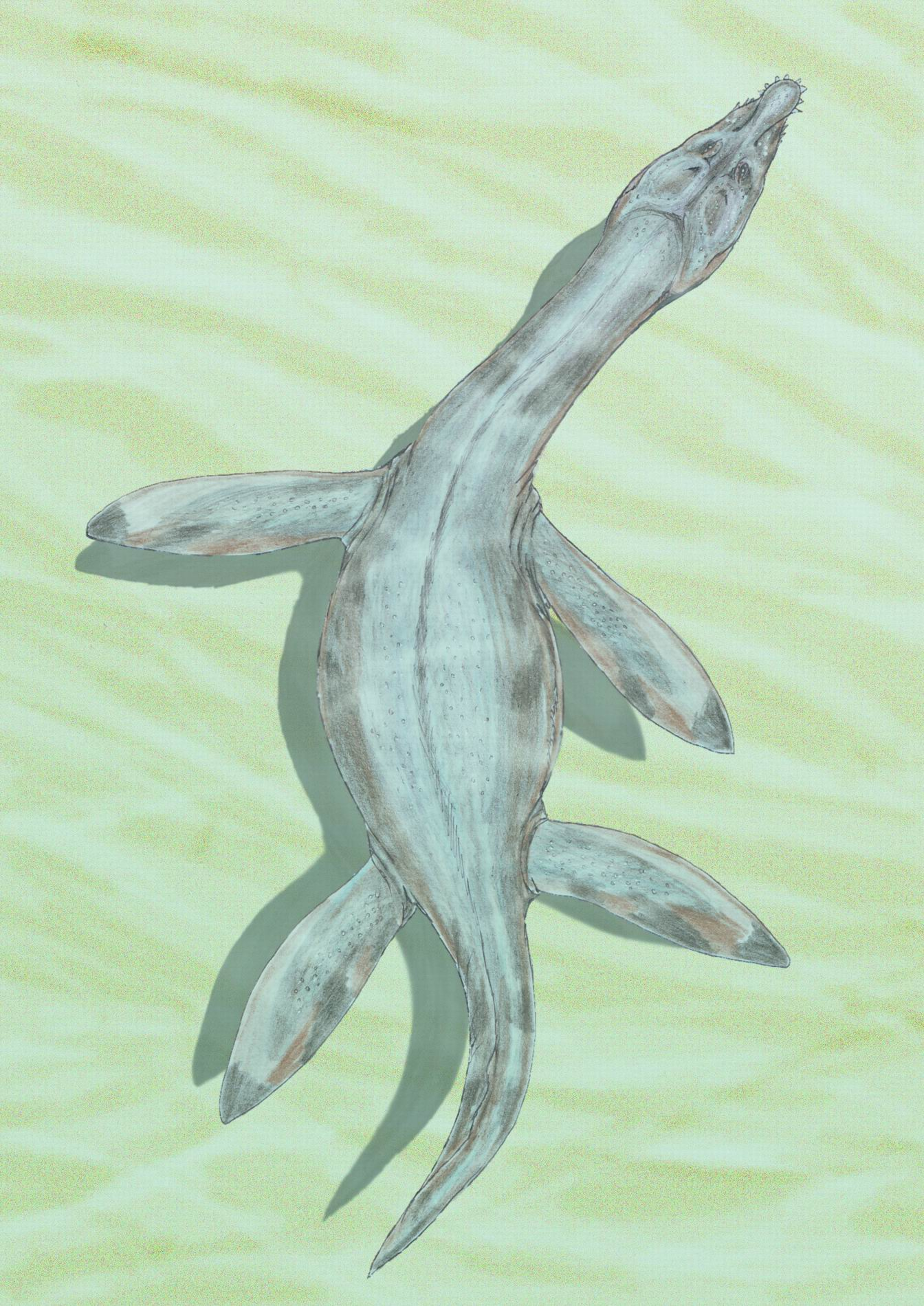
Restoration of R. cramptoni

In July 1848, a fossil of a large plesiosaur was unearthed in an alum quarry at Kettleness, near Whitby, in Yorkshire, England. It was collected from the A. bifrons ammonite zone of the Whitby Mudstone Formation, dating to the early Toarcian age, about 183 to 180 million years ago. The complete skeleton which preserved the skull, NMING F8785, was kept for five years at Mulgrave Castle, which was then owned by the Marquess of Normanby. In 1853, the Marquess introduced the interesting finding to the eminent Irish surgeon and anatomist, Sir Philip Crampton. The same year, Crampton transferred the fossil to Dublin to be displayed as a centrepiece at the 1853 British Association annual meeting. The Zoological Society of Ireland built a specially constructed building to house the large reptile. After a decade, still remaining undescribed, the specimen moved in the Royal Dublin Society museum and was officially described by Alexander Carte and W. H. Bailey as a new species of Plesiosaurus. Carte and Bailey named the species Plesiosaurus cramptoni after the Irish scientist, Sir Philip Crampton. In 1874, the British geologist Harry Govier Seeley, based on this finding, which is now known as the type genus of the family Rhomaleosauridae, recognized and erected a new genus establishing Rhomaleosaurus. Only in 2006 the skull of this specimen was finally prepared which enabled a restudy of this genus. Casts of the holotype specimen are on display at the Natural History Museum, London (NHMUK PV R 34) and Bath Royal Literary and Scientific Institution.

=== R. propinquus ===
R. propinquus is known from the holotype WM 852.S, articulated almost complete skeleton which preserved the skull, exposed in dorsal view. It was collected from the A. serpentines ammonoid zone, of the Whitby Mudstone Formation, Yorkshire, England, dating to the middle Toarcian stage, about 180-177 million years ago. R. propinquus was first named by Tate and Blake in 1876 as a new species of Plesiosaurus. Watson (1910) redescribed it as a species of Rhomaleosaurus. Adam S. Smith (2007), in his thesis on the anatomy and classification of the family Rhomaleosauridae, suggested that R. propinquus, is a junior synonym of Rhomaleosaurus zetlandicus. Smith and Gareth J. Dyke (2008) considered this species to be valid.

=== R. thorntoni ===
Size of R. thorntoni

R. thorntoni is known from the holotype NHMUK PV R 4853, three-dimensional, partially complete skeleton which preserved most of the skull and mandibles. It was collected by Henry Gerard Thornton from Kingsthorp of Northamptonshire, dating to the Toarcian stage. It is the only well-known British Toarcian rhomaleosaurid discovered away from the Yorkshire coast, to date. R. thorntoni was first named by Andrews in 1922 and later revised by Cruickshank (1996) as a junior synonym of R. cramptoni, alongside R. zetlandicus. Adam S. Smith (2007) and Smith and Gareth J. Dyke (2008) considered this species to be valid.

=== R. zetlandicus ===
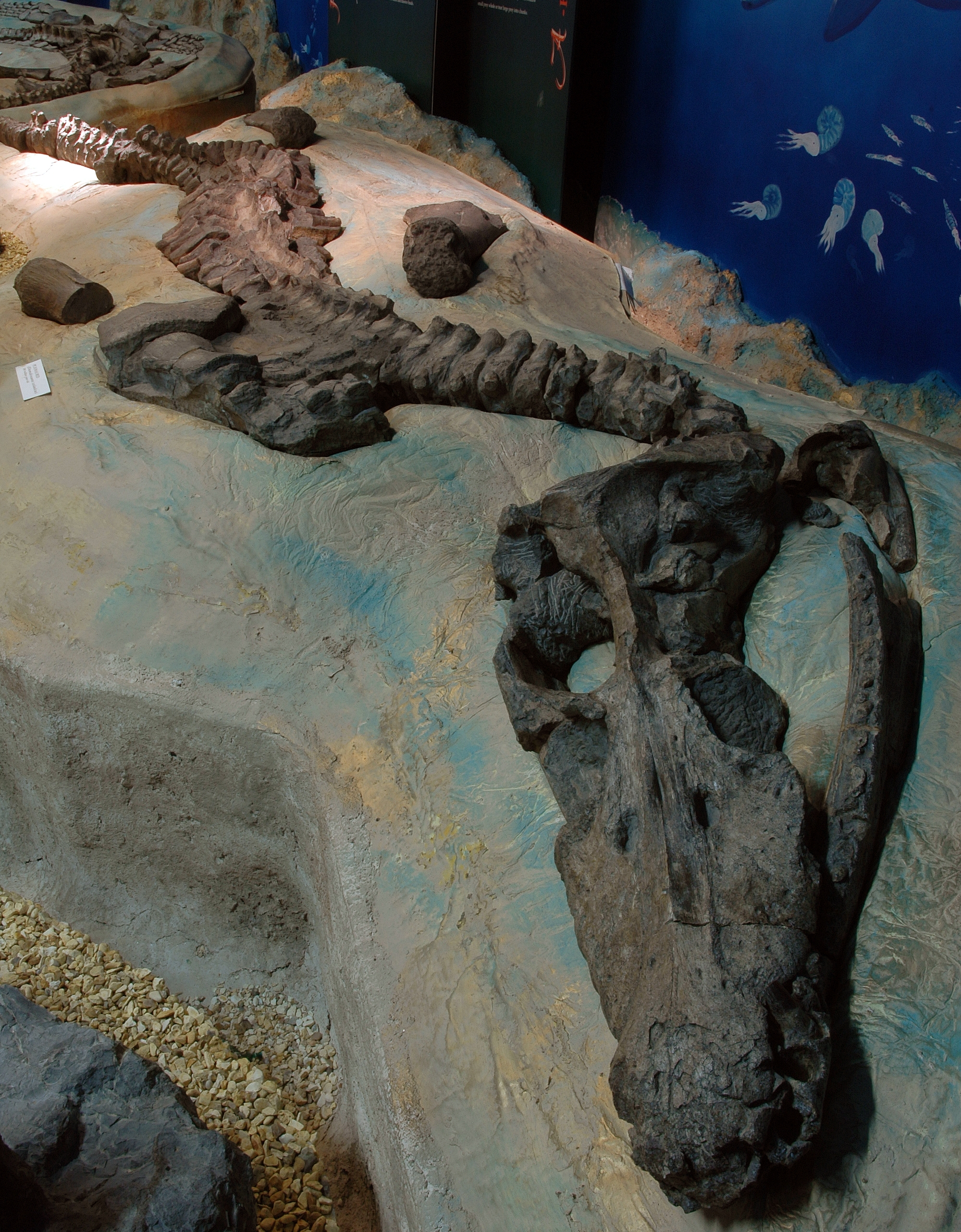
The R. zetlandicus holotype at the Yorkshire Museum

R. zetlandicus is known from the holotype YORYM G503 (pictured), a nearly complete skull and vertebral column in association with parts of the limbs. It was in the early 1850s collected from the Alum Shale of Whitby Mudstone Formation, Yorkshire, dating from the Toarcian stage and donated in 1852 to the Yorkshire Philosophical Society by Lawrence Dundas, 1st Earl of Zetland, the Loftus mine owner. R. zetlandicus was first validly named by Phillips in 1854 and its skull was described in detail by Michael Alan Taylor in 1992. Later the taxon was revised by Cruickshank (1996) as a senior synonym of R. cramptoni, R. thorntoni being a junior synonym. Adam S. Smith (2007) and Smith and Gareth J. Dyke (2008) considered this species to be valid.

=== Reassigned species ===
Through the years, various species have been referred to as Rhomaleosaurus. However, according to Smith (2007), in his thesis on the anatomy and classification of the family Rhomaleosauridae, the genus Rhomaleosaurus has only three valid species: R. cramptoni, R. thorntoni and R. zetlandicus. Smith and Dyke (2008) also recognized R. propinquus as valid. Other species that previously fell under this genus were: R. megacephalus and R. victor. Smith (2007) and Smith and Dyke (2008) pointed out that these species do not belong to Rhomaleosaurus, as R. megacephalus is referred to Eurycleidus (or to a new genus by Smith and Dyke (2008)) and R. victor represents a new genus named Meyerasaurus by Smith and Vincent in 2010. Cladistic analyses by Ketchum & Benson, 2010, Benson et al., 2011 and Ketchum & Benson, 2011 found R. megacephalus to be basal to the clade containing Rhomaleosaurus and Eurycleidus, thus it should be in its own genus as suggested by Smith and Dyke (2008). Following this, it has been placed in its own genus, Atychodracon. (Smith, 2015).

==== Thaumatosaurus ====
The name Thaumatosaurus, which means 'wonder reptile', belonged to a genus of plesiosaur that was described by palaeontologist Christian Erich Hermann von Meyer, back in 1841. Meyer described the species Thaumatosaurus oolithicus based on partial skull, vertebral and limb remains, that were found in the Posidonia Shale of Holzmaden, Baden-Württemberg, Germany. In 1856, Meyer published a full description of Thaumatosaurus and later provided figures of the specimen. Richard Lydekker (1889) regarded Rhomaleosaurus as a synonym of Thaumatosaurus because Richard Lydekker and Harry G. Seeley "refused steadfastly to recognize the generic and specific names proposed by one another". Lydekker referred continuously to the name Thaumatosaurus, instead of Rhomaleosaurus. Fraas (1910) recognized both generic names in his original description of R. victor (now Meyerasaurus), but referring to the new species "Thaumatosaurus" victor. Many other researchers adopted the name "Thaumatosaurus". Today this taxon is regarded as a nomen dubium because the holotype can be referred to Pliosauroidea indet at best. The diagnostic specimens which previously were regarded as Thaumatosaurus's specimens, now represent the holotypes of Eurycleidus, Meyerasaurus and Rhomaleosaurus.

== Phylogeny ==
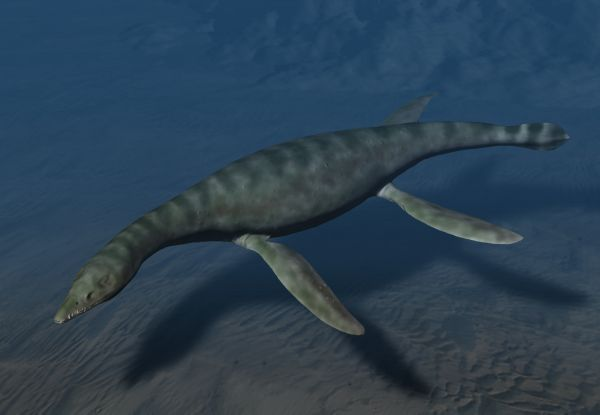
CGI restoration of R. cramptoni

Smith & Dyke, 2008 redescribed the skull of R. cramptoni after its final preparation. Both Rhomaleosauridae and Pliosauridae were found to be monophyletic, and the relations between Rhomaleosaurus's species were tested. The cladogram below follows Smith & Dyke (2008), with the asterisk noting species removed from Rhomaleosaurus to their own genera since their study.

- Rhomaleosauridae
  - Archaeonectrus rostratus
  - - - Macroplata tenuiceps
      - - WARWKS G10875 → Unnamed species*
        - - Atychodracon megacephalus*
          - LEICS G221.1851 referred to Atychodracon megacephalus*
          - NMING F8749 referred to Atychodracon megacephalus*
          - NMING F10194 referred to Atychodracon megacephalus*
          - Eurycleidus arcuatus
    - - Sthenarosaurus dawkinsi
      - - Meyerasaurus victor*
        - - Maresaurus coccai
          - - Rhomaleosaurus propinquus
            - Rhomaleosaurus zetlandicus
            - - Rhomaleosaurus cramptoni
              - Rhomaleosaurus thorntoni

== Paleobiology ==
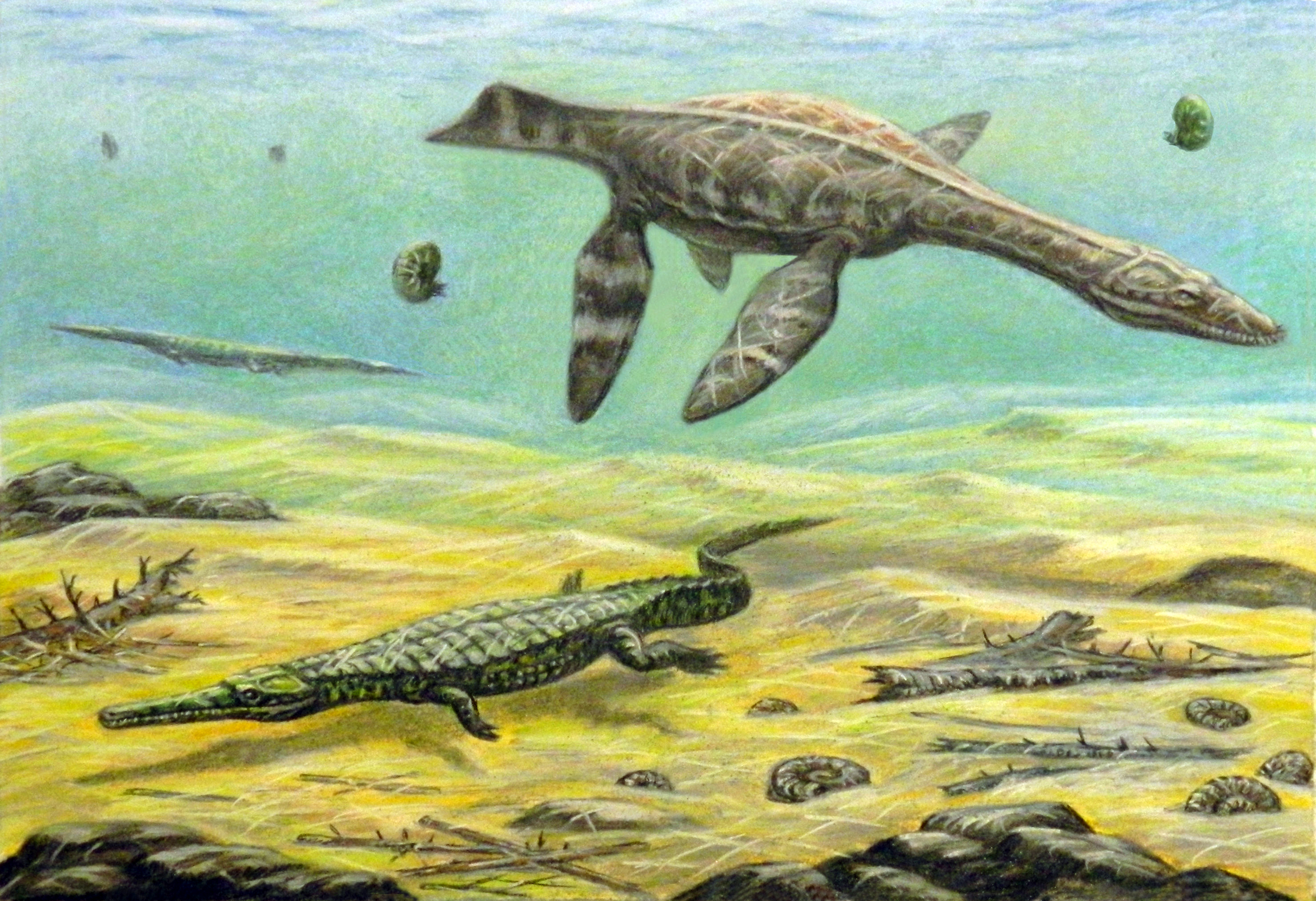
Restoration of Rhomaleosaurus and Teleosaurus

Rhomaleosaurus may have been able to pick up scents while submerged by forcing water through passages in its skull containing sensory organs. This adaptation would have enabled it to hunt its prey in a similar manner to some modern shark species.

== Paleoecology ==
Rhomaleosaurus coexisted with the extinct ichthyosaur Temnodontosaurus in which both acted as top-tier consumers with both feeding on ammonites, plesiosaurs, and ichthyosaurs.

== See also ==
- List of plesiosaur genera
- Timeline of plesiosaur research
