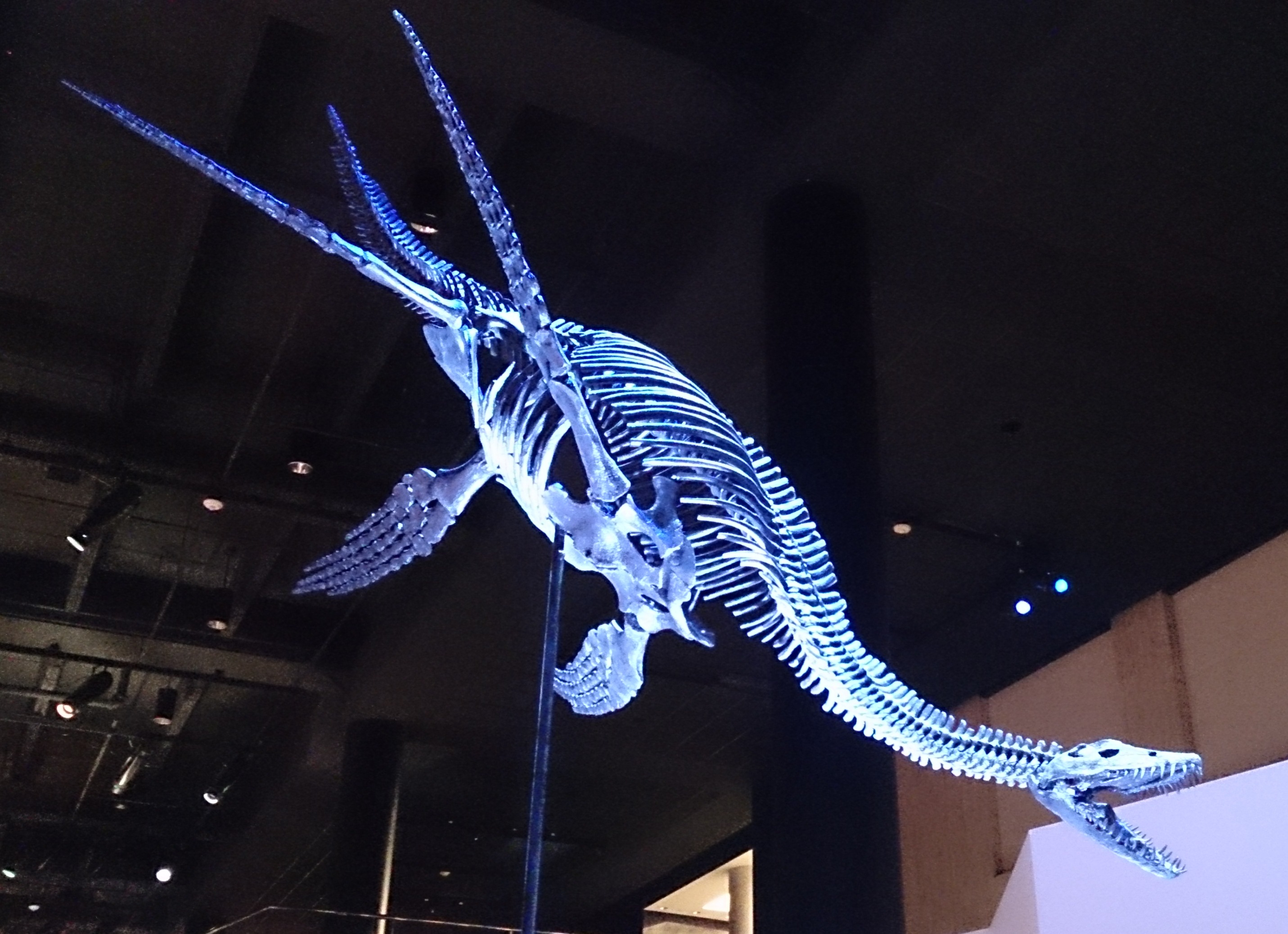
- Plesiosaurus skeleton

Scientific classification
- Kingdom: Animalia
- Phylum: Chordata
- Class: Reptilia
- Superorder: †Sauropterygia
- Order: †Plesiosauria
- Superfamily: †Plesiosauroidea
- Family: †Plesiosauridae; Gray, 1825

Genera
- †Eretmosaurus; †Hydrorion; †Leurospondylus?; †Plesiosaurus

= Plesiosauridae =

Plesiosaurids Temporal range: 199.6–174.7 Ma Early Jurassic - Late Cretaceous?

Extinct family of pleusiosaurs

The Plesiosauridae are a monophyletic family of plesiosaurs named by John Edward Gray in 1825.
