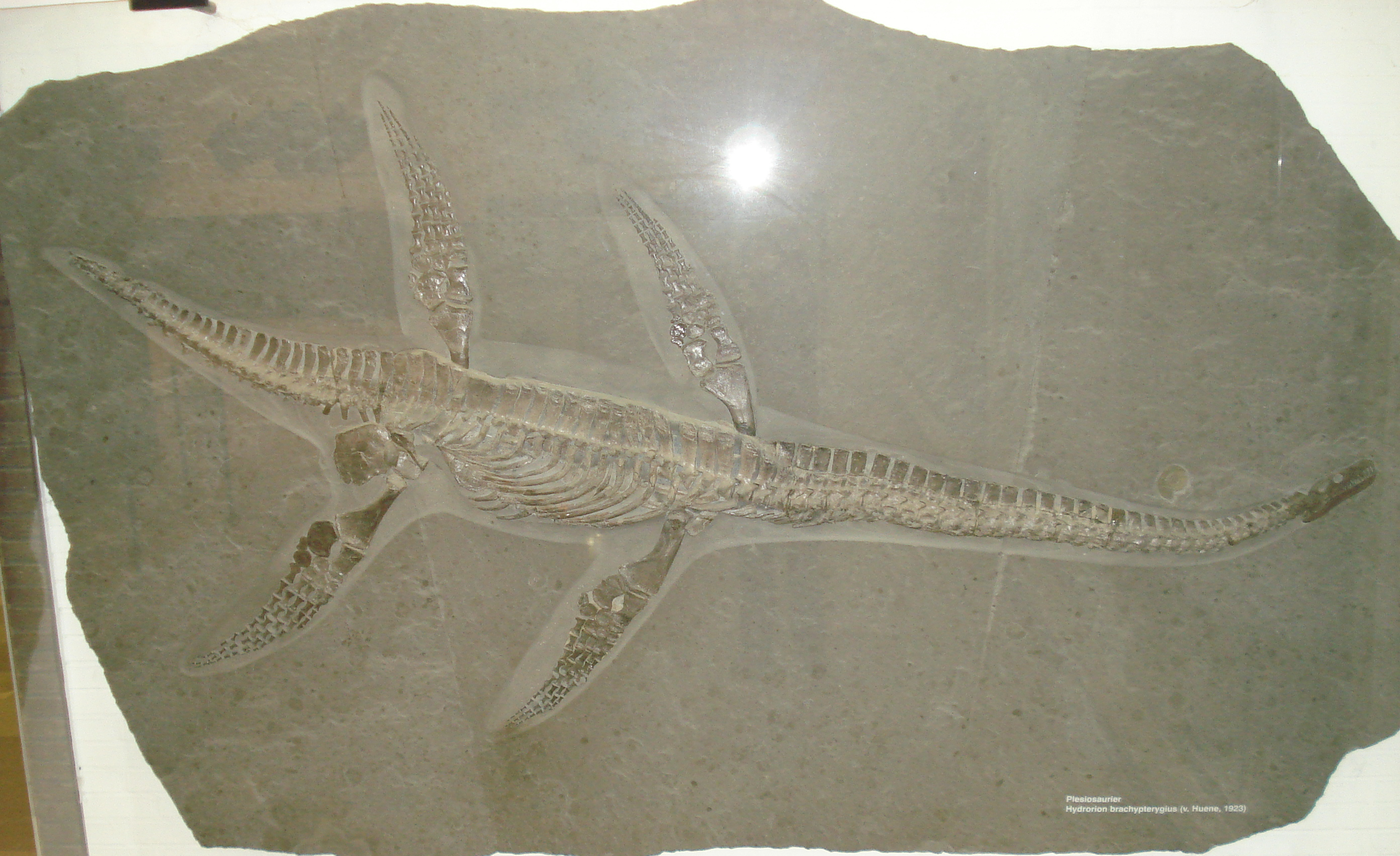
- Skeleton

Scientific classification
- Domain: Eukaryota
- Kingdom: Animalia
- Phylum: Chordata
- Class: Reptilia
- Superorder: †Sauropterygia
- Order: †Plesiosauria
- Family: †Microcleididae
- Genus: †Hydrorion; Großmann, 2007

Type species
- †Hydrorion brachypterygius (von Huene, 1923)

Synonyms
- Microcleidus brachypterygius von Huene, 1923; Plesiosaurus brachypterygius (von Huene, 1923)

= Hydrorion =

Hydrorion Temporal range: Lower Jurassic, Toarcian

Extinct genus of reptiles

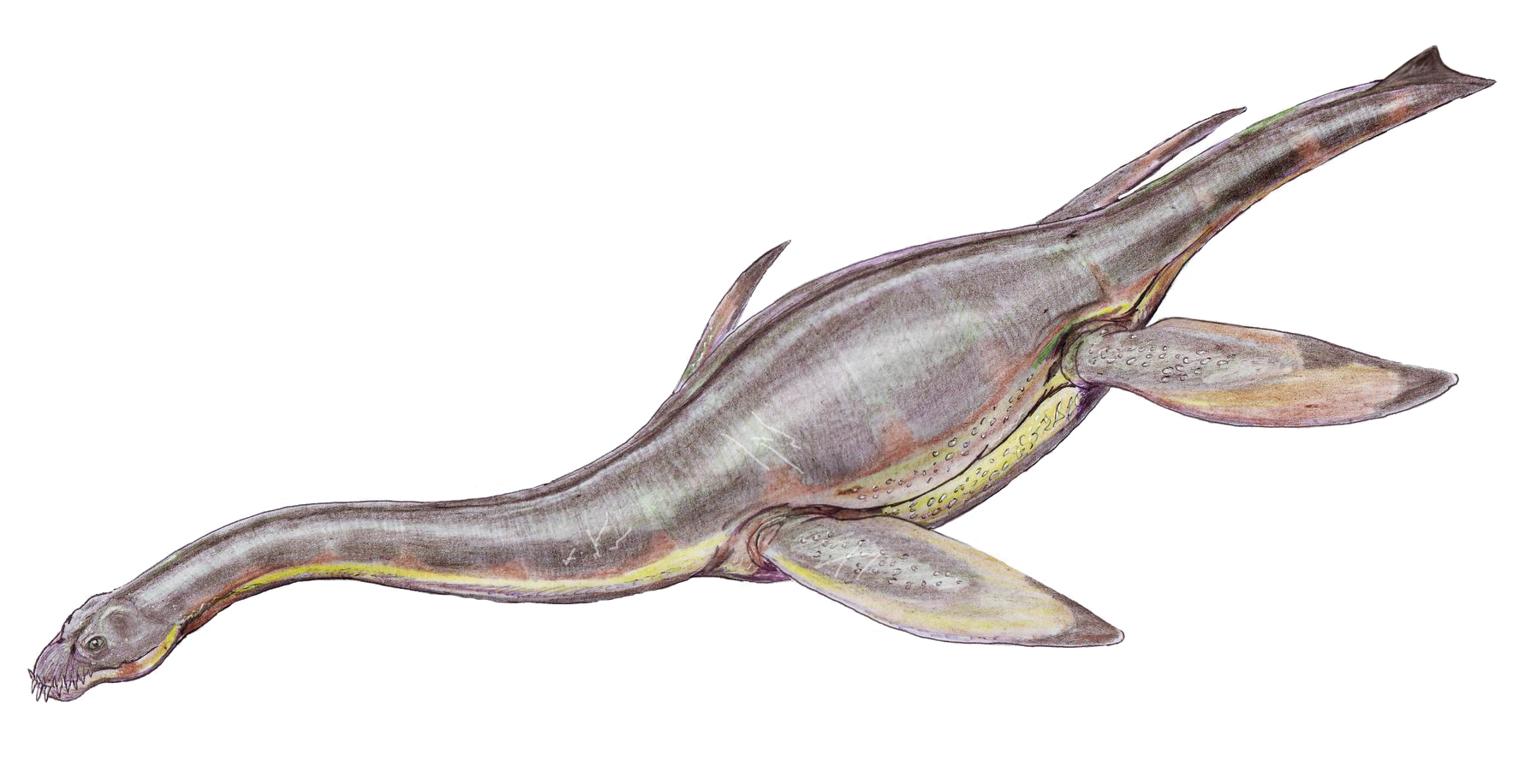
Restoration

Hydrorion (meaning 'water hunter') is a genus of plesiosaur from the Toarcian Age of the Lower Jurassic. It is only known from multiple specimens, all discovered in the Posidonia Shale of south-western Germany. The only species of Hydrorion is H. brachypterygius, which was originally described as a species of Plesiosaurus and then Microcleidus. It was a relatively small plesiosaur, with the largest specimen measuring 4 m (13 ft) long.

== See also ==
- Timeline of plesiosaur research
