= List of crabs of New Zealand =

In the waters in and around New Zealand, 77 living species of crabs (and 10 species of crab-like Anomura) have been recorded, along with a further 24 species of fossil crabs (marked with an obelisk). Of the extant crabs, 37 are endemic to New Zealand (marked in boldface). The taxonomy below follows Ng et al. (2008) for the extant species, and De Grave et al. (2009) for the fossils.

Almost all the species are marine, with a single freshwater species, Amarinus lacustris (Hymenosomatidae). An updated checklist published in 2010 lists 167 species of Brachyura, plus a little over 50 species of crab-like Anomura. This list (of N.Z. Decapoda) has been republished with annotations in 2011.

== Brachyura ==
=== Section Dromiacea ===
Dromiidae

- Petalomera wilsoni (Fulton & Grant, 1902)

Homolidae

- Dagnaudus petterdi (Grant, 1905)
- Homola orientalis Henderson, 1888
- Yaldwynopsis spinimanus (Griffin, 1965)

Latreilliidae

- Eplumula australiensis (Henderson, 1888)

=== Section Raninoida ===
Raninidae

- Hemioon novozelandicum Glaessner, 1980 †
- Laeviranina perarmata Glaessner, 1960 †
- Lyreidus elegans Glaessner, 1960 †
- Lyreidus tridentatus De Haan 1841
- Lyreidus waitakiensis Glaessner, 1980 †
- Ranilia pororariensis Glaessner, 1980 †

=== Section Cyclodorippoida ===
Cymonomidae

- **Cymonomus aequilonius Dell, 1971**
- **Cymonomus bathamae Dell, 1971**

Torynommidae

- Torynomma flemingi Glaessner, 1980 †

=== Section Heterotremata ===
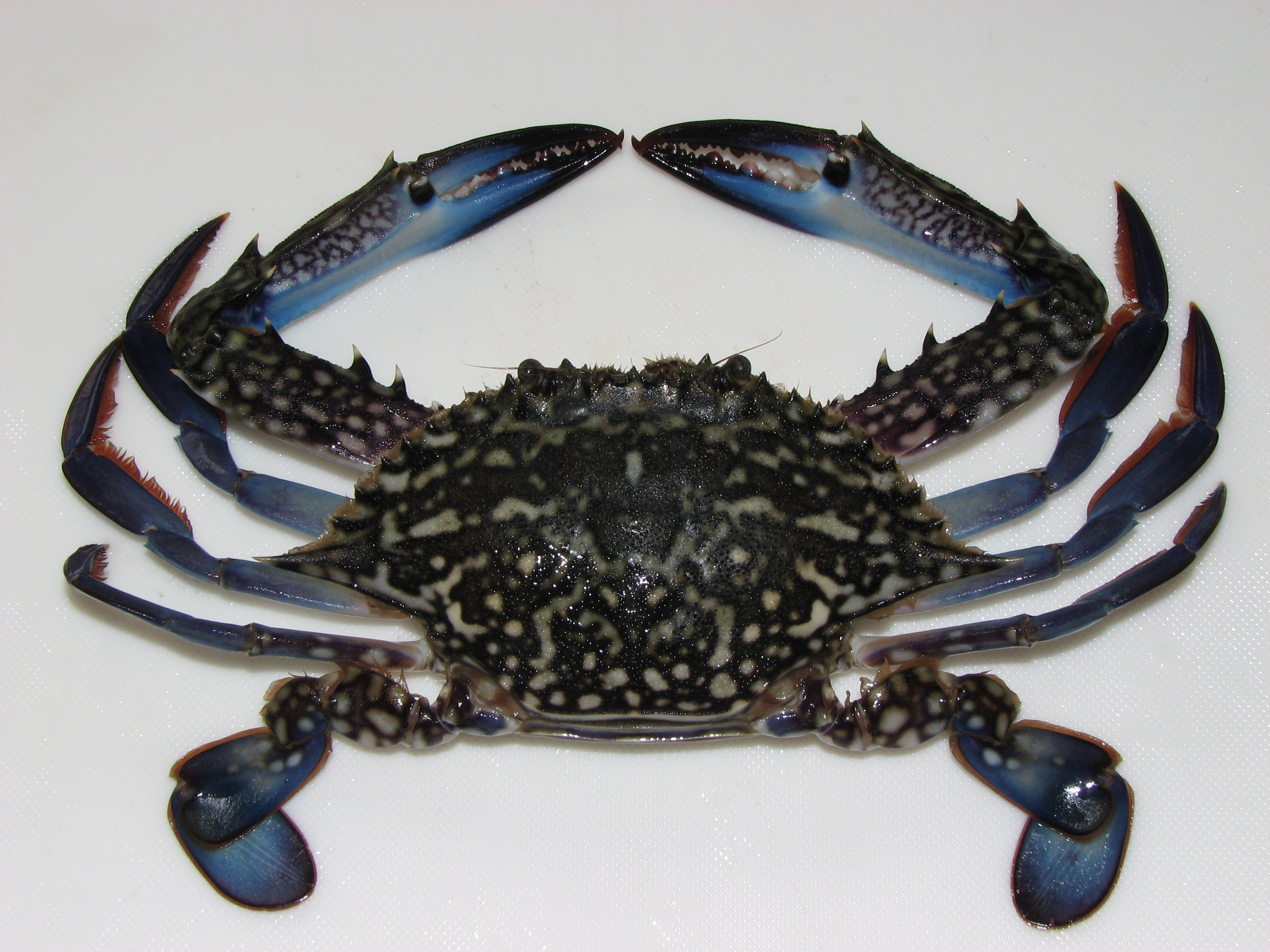
Portunus pelagicus

Leucosiidae

- **Ebalia laevis (Bell, 1855)**
- Merocryptus lambriformis A. Milne-Edwards, 1873
- Tanaoa pustulosus (Wood-Mason in Wood-Mason & Alcock, 1891)

Majidae

- **Eurynolambrus australis H. Milne-Edwards & Lucas, 1841**
- **Eurynome bituberculata Griffin, 1964**
- **Jacquinotia edwardsi (Jacquinot, 1853)**
- Leptomithrax atavus Glaessner, 1960 †
- **Leptomithrax australis (Jacquinot in Jacquinot & Lucas, 1853)**
- **Leptomithrax garricki Griffin, 1966**
- Leptomithrax irirangi Glaessner, 1960 †
- **Leptomithrax longimanus Miers, 1876**
- Leptomithrax longipes (Thomson, 1902)
- Leptomithrax tuberculatus Whitelegge, 1900
- Leptomithrax uruti Glaessner, 1960 †
- Notomithrax minor (Filhol, 1885)
- **Notomithrax peronii (H. Milne-Edwards, 1834)**
- Notomithrax ursus (Herbst, 1788)
- **Prismatopus filholi (A. Milne-Edwards, 1876)**
- **Teratomaia richardsoni (Dell, 1960)**

Inachidae

- Achaeus curvirostris (A. Milne-Edwards, 1873)
- Cyrtomaia lamellata Rathbun, 1906
- Dorhynchus ramusculus (Baker, 1906)
- Platymaia maoria Dell, 1963
- Platymaia n.sp.
- **Trichoplatus huttoni A. Milne-Edwards, 1876**

Inachoididae

- Pyromaia tuberculata (Lockington, 1877)

Epialtidae

- Actinotocarcinus chidgeyi Jenkins, 1974 †
- Rochinia riversandersoni (Alcock, 1895)
- Leptomaia tuberculata Griffin & Tranter, 1986

Atelecyclidae

- **Pteropeltarion novaezelandiae Dell, 1972**
- **Trichopeltarion fantasticum Richardson & Dell, 1964**
- Trichopeltarion greggi Dell, 1969 †

Cancridae

- **Metacarcinus novaezelandiae (Hombron & Jacquinot, 1846)**

Tumidocarcinidae

- Tumidocarcinus dentatus Glaessner, 1960 †
- Tumidocarcinus giganteus Glaessner, 1960 †
- Tumidocarcinus tumidus (Woodward, 1876) †

Dorippidae

- ?Eodorippe spedeni Glaessner, 1980 †

Macropipidae

- Pororaria eocenica Glaessner, 1980 †

Portunidae

- Ovalipes catharus (White in White & Doubleday, 1843)
- Ovalipes molleri (Ward, 1933)
- Ovalipes sp A. Glaessner, 1960 †
- Portunus pelagicus (Linnaeus, 1766)
- Liocarcinus corrugatus (Pennant, 1777)
- **Nectocarcinus antarcticus (Hombron & Jacquinot, 1846)**
- **Nectocarcinus bennetti Takeda & Miyake, 1969**
- Rhachiosoma granulifera (Glaessrier, 1960) †
- Scylla serrata (Forskal, 1775)

Menippidae

- Menippe sp. Glaessner, 1960 †
- Pseudocarcinus sp. Glaessner, 1960 †

Oziidae

- Ozius truncatus H. Milne-Edwards, 1834

Pilumnidae

- Pilumnopeus serratifrons (Kinahan, 1856)
- **Pilumnus lumpinus Bennett, 1964**
- **Pilumnus novaezealandiae Filhol, 1886**

Belliidae

- **Heterozius rotundifrons A. Milne-Edwards 1867**

Goneplacidae

- Carcinoplax victoriensis Rathbun, 1923
- Goneplax arenicola (Glaessner, 1960) †
- **Neommatocarcinus huttoni (Filhol, 1886)**

Galenidae

- Galene proavita Glaessner, 1960 †

=== Section Thoracotremata ===
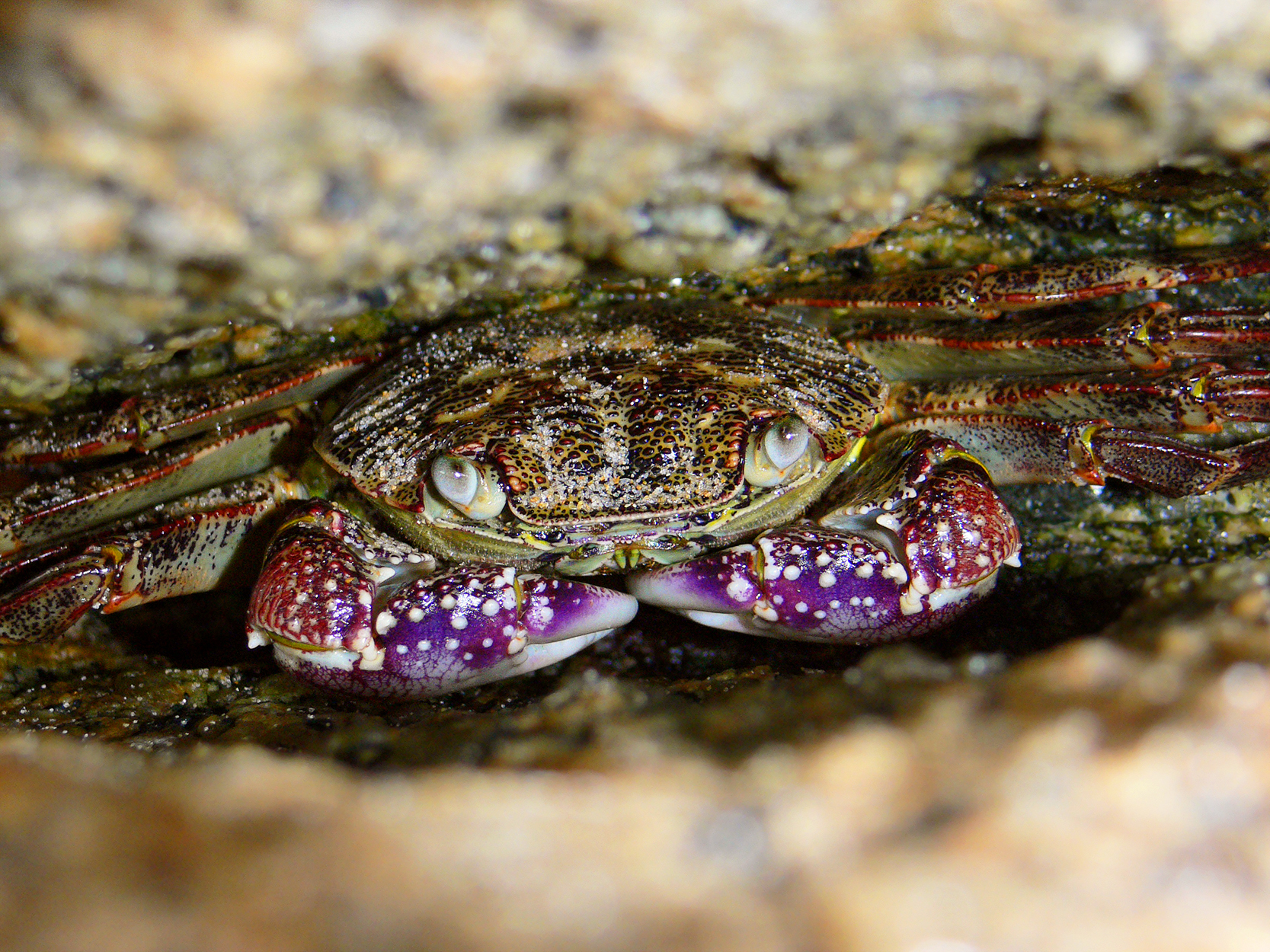
Leptograpsus variegatus

Grapsidae

- **Austrohelice crassa (Dana, 1851)**
- Leptograpsus variegatus (Fabricius, 1793)
- Miograpsus papaka Fleming, 1981 †
- Planes cyaneus Dana, 1852
- Planes marinus Rathbun, 1914

Plagusiidae

- Plagusia chabrus (Linnaeus, 1758)
- Plagusia squamosa (Herbst, 1790)

Varunidae

- Hemigrapsus crenulatus (H. Milne-Edwards, 1837)
- **Hemigrapsus sexdentatus (H. Milne-Edwards, 1837)**
- Cyclograpsus insularum Campbell & Griffin, 1966
- Cyclograpsus lavauxi H. Milne-Edwards, 1853

Pinnotheridae

- **Pinnotheres atrinicola Page, 1983**
- **Pinnotheres novaezelandiae Filhol, 1886**

Ocypodidae

- **Macrophthalmus hirtipes (Jacquinot in Hombron & Jacquinot, 1846)**
- ?Macrophthalmus major (Glaessner, 1960) †

Hymenosomatidae

- Amarinus lacustris (Chilton, 1882)
- **Elamena longirostris Filhol, 1885**
- **Elamena momona Melrose, 1975**
- **Elamena producta Kirk, 1878**
- **Halicarcinus cookii (Filhol, 1885)**
- Halicarcinus innominatus Richardson, 1949
- Halicarcinus ovatus Stimpson, 1858
- Halicarcinus planatus (Fabricius, 1775)
- **Halicarcinus tongi Melrose, 1975**
- **Halicarcinus varius (Dana, 1851)**
- **Halicarcinus whitei (Miers, 1876)**
- **Halimena aotearoa Melrose, 1975**
- **Hymenosoma depressum Jacquinot, 1853**
- **Neohymenicus pubescens (Dana, 1851)**

== Anomura ==
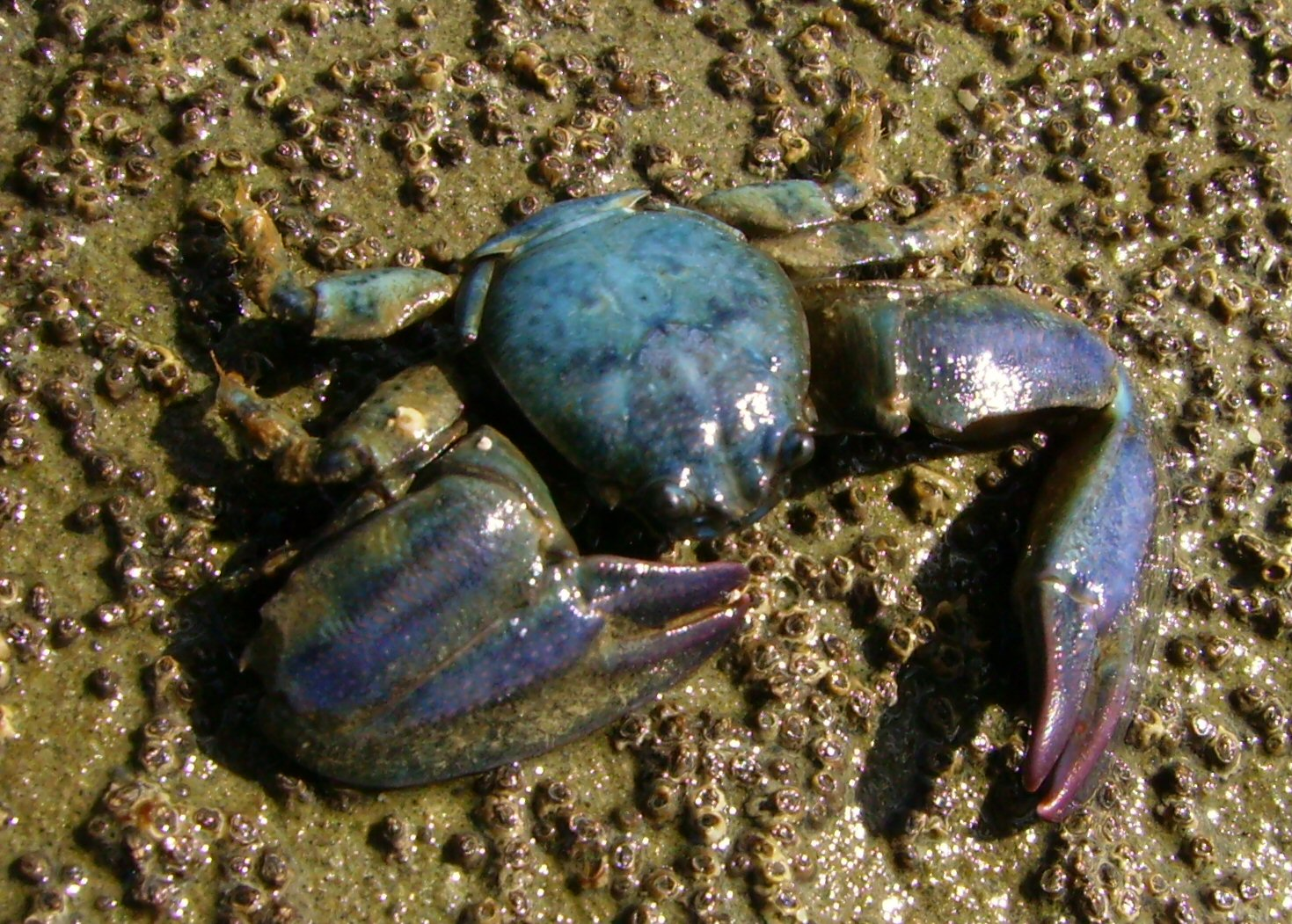
Petrolisthes elongatus, Whangaparaoa, near Auckland

Lithodidae

- Lithodes aotearoa Ahyong, 2010
- Lithodes jessica Ahyong, 2010
- Lithodes macquaria Ahyong, 2010
- Lithodes robertsoni Ahyong, 2010
- Neolithodes brodiei Dawson & Yaldwyn, 1970
- Neolithodes bronwynae Ahyong, 2010
- Paralomis dawsoni Macpherson, 2001
- Paralomis debodeorum Feldman, 1998 †
- Paralomis echidna Ahyong, 2010
- Paralomis hirtella Saint Laurent & Macpherson, 1997
- Paralomis poorei Ahyong, 2010
- Paralomis staplesi Ahyong, 2010
- Paralomis webberi Ahyong, 2010
- Paralomis zealandica Dawson & Yaldwyn, 1971

Paguridae

- **Porcellanopagurus edwardsi Filhol, 1885**

Porcellanidae

- Petrolisthes elongatus (H. Milne-Edwards, 1837)
- **Petrolisthes novaezelandiae Flihol, 1886**
- **Petrocheles spinosus Miers, 1876**

== See also ==
- Fauna of New Zealand
