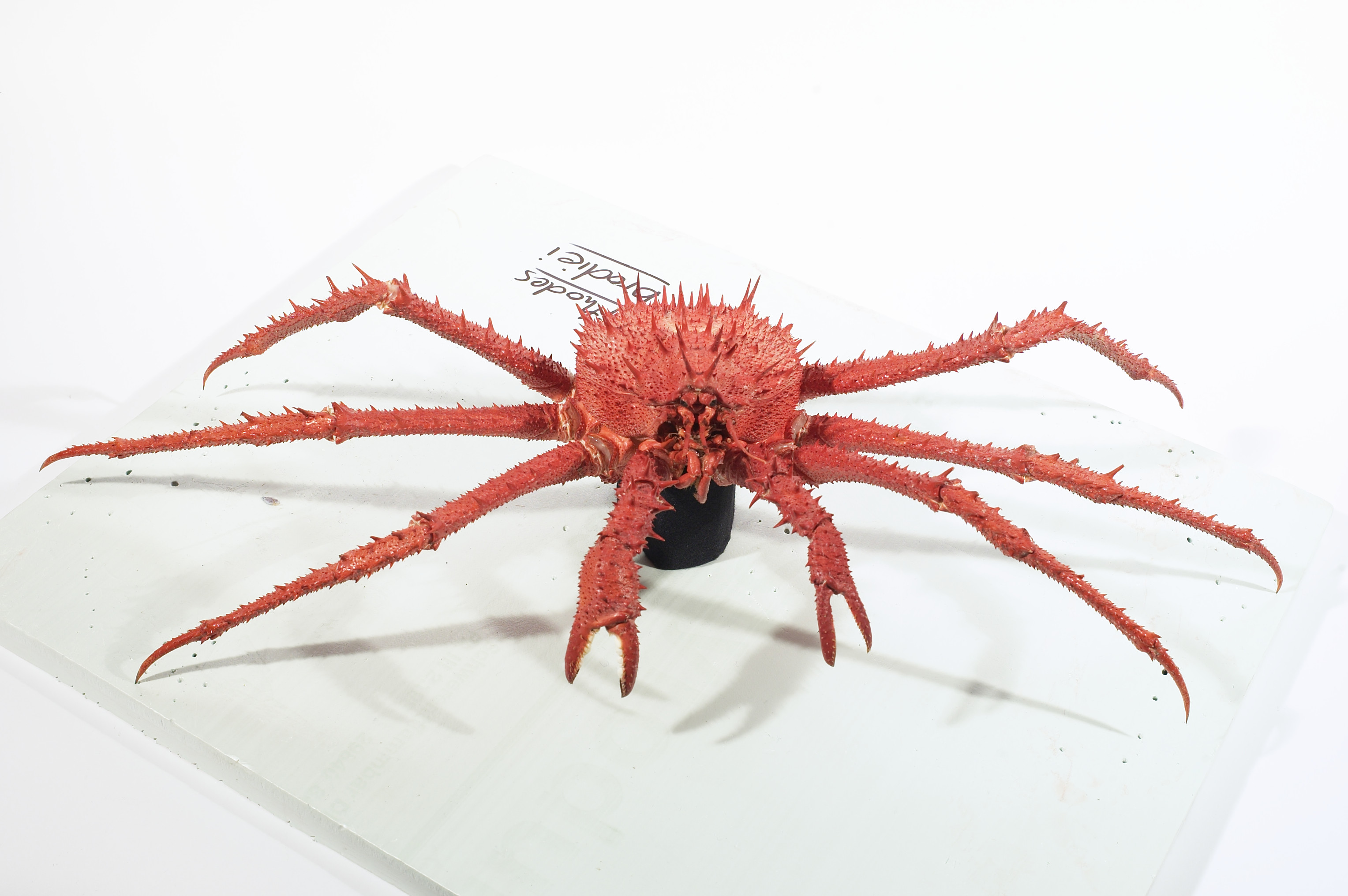

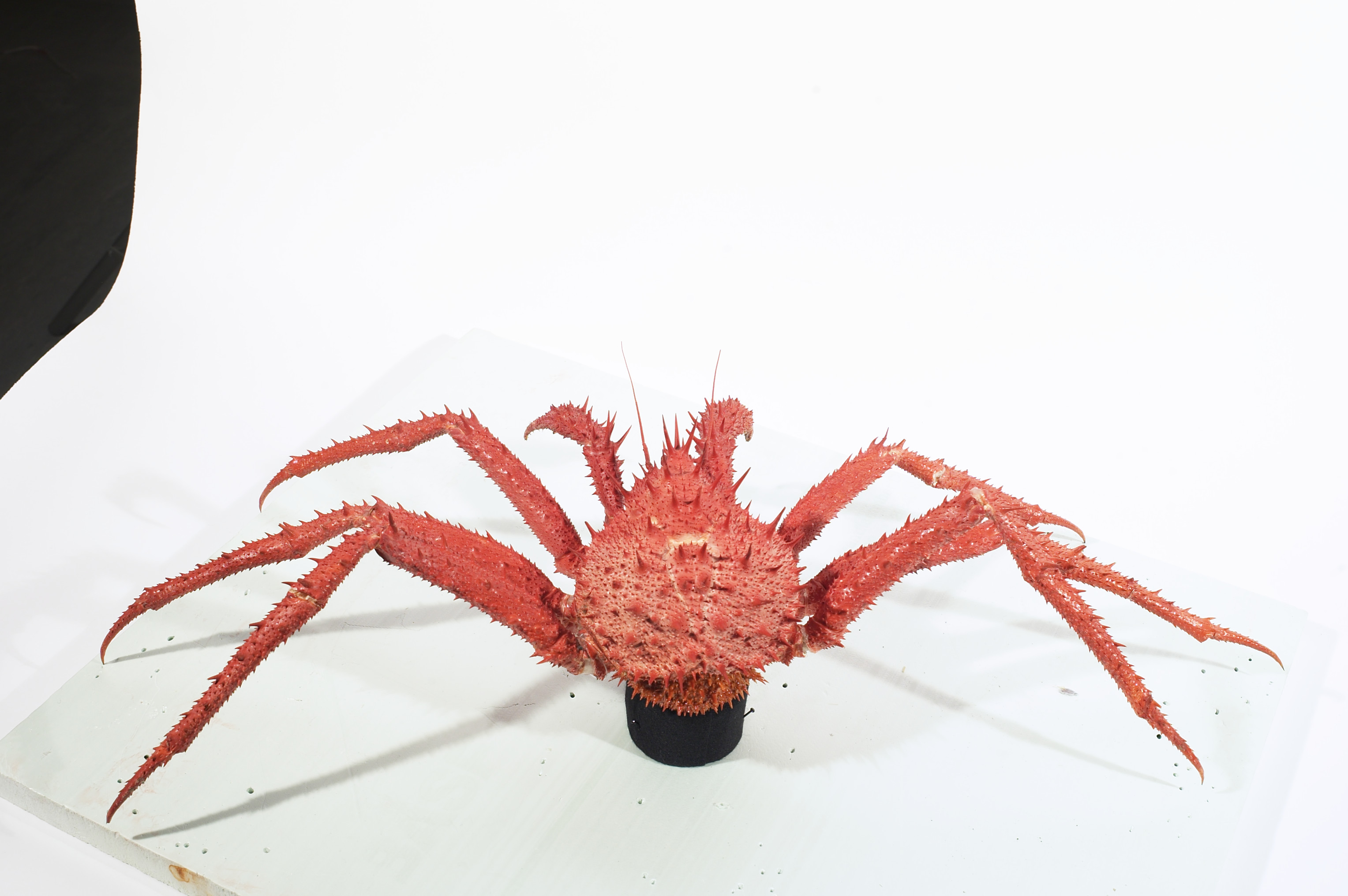

Conservation status
- Not Threatened (NZ TCS)

Scientific classification
- Kingdom: Animalia
- Phylum: Arthropoda
- Clade: Pancrustacea
- Class: Malacostraca
- Order: Decapoda
- Suborder: Pleocyemata
- Infraorder: Anomura
- Family: Lithodidae
- Genus: Neolithodes
- Species: N. brodiei

Binomial name
- Neolithodes brodiei Dawson & Yaldwyn, 1970

= Neolithodes brodiei =

Species of king crab

Neolithodes brodiei, also known as Brodie's king crab, is a species of king crab that is native to New Zealand and its adjacent waters. It lives at a depth of 500–1,240 metres (1,640–4,070 ft) but is typically found within a range of 950–1,150 metres (3,120–3,770 ft). It is the most widespread and common king crab in New Zealand waters, and the New Zealand Department of Conservation has classified it as "Not Threatened" in 2013 and 2023.

== Description ==
Neolithodes brodiei has a pyriform carapace and is deep-red in colour. The dorsal surface of its carapace is densely armed with granules or small spinules and dotted with longer, major spines. This pattern extends to the second abdominal segment, the walking legs, and all but the very tips of the chelipeds. Its trifid rostrum accounts for anywhere from about 10–20% of the carapace length, and the median spine is dorsally inclined.

N. brodiei is the second-largest king crab known from New Zealand behind Lithodes aotearoa. Its carapace, 0.99–1.14× as long as it is wide, has been measured as large as 165.5 mm (6.52 in) in postorbital length (Note: Postorbital length excludes the rostrum. Including the rostrum, this is 188 mm (7.4 in).) and 161.6 mm (6.36 in) in width. The chelipeds, though dimorphic, are similar in length: both approximately 1.2–1.3× the postorbital carapace length in males and approximately 1.15–1.2× in females. Its first pair of walking legs are the shortest, and its third pair are the longest; in males and females respectively, the third walking leg measures up to 2.94× or 2.62× the postorbital carapace length.

== Distribution ==
Neolithodes brodiei lacks a known presence beyond depths of about 1,200 m (3,900 ft), meaning it likely lives only on New Zealand's continental shelf and continental slope. It has allegedly been found in the Haima cold seeps in the northwestern South China Sea at depths of approximately 1,300–1,400 metres (4,300–4,600 ft), but it may only occasionally visit the ecosystem.

In 2001, a paper published in Zoosystema claimed to have found a specimen of N. brodiei in Vanuatu; however, this was later determined to be a yet-undescribed species. Likewise, a 2005 paper in Polar Biology claimed to have found four specimens off the Balleny Islands in the Southern Ocean, but these were misidentified and were later determined to be a new species called Neolithodes yaldwyni. It was also thought to occur in the southwestern Tasman Sea, but this was also determined to be a new species called Neolithodes flindersi.

== Taxonomy ==
Neolithodes brodiei was described in 1970 by carcinologists Elliot Watson Dawson and John Cameron Yaldwyn from an ovigerous female holotype found on the Campbell Plateau. Its specific name "brodiei" is in recognition of James William Brodie, then-Director of the New Zealand Oceanographic Institute.

Along with N. flindersi, N. indicus, and N. nipponensis, it belongs to a subgroup of Neolithodes defined by carcinologist Shane T. Ahyong as having "numerous secondary spinules on the carapace and pereopods in addition to the major spines; convex dorsal margins of the cheliped dactylus; and compressed, flattened meri of the walking legs". By contrast, it is markedly different from N. bronwynae, the only other Neolithodes known to live in New Zealand waters.

== See also ==
- List of crabs of New Zealand
