= Neolithodes indicus =

Scientific classification
- Kingdom: Animalia
- Phylum: Arthropoda
- Clade: Pancrustacea
- Class: Malacostraca
- Order: Decapoda
- Suborder: Pleocyemata
- Infraorder: Anomura
- Family: Lithodidae
- Genus: Neolithodes
- Species: N. indicus

Binomial name
- Neolithodes indicus Padate, Cubelio & Takeda, 2020

Species of king crab

Neolithodes indicus is a species of king crab found in the southeastern Arabian Sea.

== Description ==
Neolithodes indicus has a pyriform carapace whose dorsal surface is heavily populated with small spinules in between major, conical spines; at the longest in one of its female paratypes, it has been measured at 188.3 mm (7.41 in) in length and 169.7 mm (6.68 in) in width. Its rostrum is about 3–10% as long as the postorbital carapace in large specimens. Like the carapace, its chelipeds and walking legs are covered in small spinules, and its rear walking legs – which are the longest – have four major spines. The chelipeds and walking legs are lighter in colouration than the carapace, however, which is a clay-like reddish-brown. Its chelae have several small spines and are lined with rows of golden setae.

On the underside, its short, cylindrical fifth set of legs are tucked under its abdomen and covered in bristles. Except for the first segment which is sparsely populated with tubercles, the abdomen is covered in numerous evenly spaced spinules. The median and submedian plates of the second segment of its abdomen bear large spines, as do the margins of the second through fifth segments.

== Distribution ==
Neolithodes indicus is known from three female specimens collected in the southeastern Arabian Sea off the coast of Thiruvananthapuram in Kerala, India from 2013 to 2014. These three specimens were found at depths between 1,064–1,338 m (3,491–4,390 ft) in the mid-continental slope on a bathymetric protrusion known as the Terrace of Trivandrum.

== Taxonomy ==
Neolithodes indicus was described in 2020 by carcinologists Vinay Padate, Sherine Sonia Cubelio, and Masatsune Takeda. Its genus name "Neolithodes" is derived from Greek and Latin and means "new stone-crab", while its species name "indicus" is Latin for "Indian". It is likely conspecific with Neolithodes alcocoki, a nomen nudum suggested in the 1980s, and it was originally identified erroneously as Lithodes agassizii (Note: Now Neolithodes agassizii) by A.R.S. Anderson in 1896. N. indicus most closely resembles N. brodiei from New Zealand, N. flindersi from southeastern Australia, and N. nipponensis from Japan and Taiwan.
