= Fauna of New Zealand =

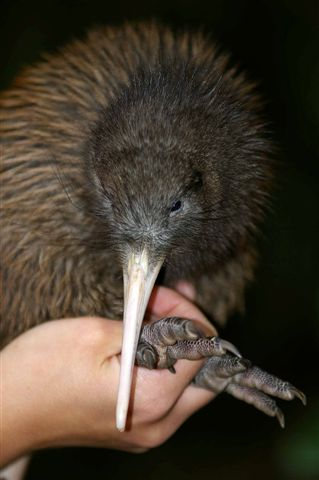
The kiwi is a national symbol of New Zealand.

The animals of New Zealand, part of its biota, have an unusual history because, before the arrival of humans less than 900 years ago, the country was mostly free of mammals, except those that could swim there (seals, sea lions, and, off-shore, whales and dolphins) or fly there (bats). However, as recently as the Miocene, it was home to the terrestrial Saint Bathans mammal, implying that mammals had been present since the island had broken away from other landmasses. The absence of mammals meant that all of the ecological niches occupied by mammals elsewhere were occupied instead by either insects or birds, leading to an unusually large number of flightless birds, including the kiwi, the weka, the moa (now extinct), the takahē, and the kākāpō.

Because of the lack of predators, even bats spend most of their time on the ground. There are also about 60 species of lizard (30 each of gecko and skink), four species of frog (all rare and endangered), and the tuatara (reptiles resembling lizards but with a distinct lineage).

Some butterflies of New Zealand are endemic, while many species have been introduced and some species of butterflies periodically migrate to New Zealand. The Australian painted lady has been known to migrate from Australia to New Zealand in times of strong migration in Australia.

Humans brought mammals to New Zealand. Māori settlers arrived before about 1300 CE with the kurī (dog) and kiore (Polynesian rat). Europeans later introduced pigs, mice, other rats, cats, stoats, ferrets, possums and deer, among others. Rats, ferrets, cats, stoats and dogs have seriously harmed native species and driven some to extinction, while possums and deer have damaged forest that many birds depend on. Since the 1910s, mammals have been removed from many offshore islands, and some mainland reserves now use predator-proof fences to keep them out.

== Birds ==
The birds of New Zealand evolved into an avifauna that included many endemic species found in no other country. As an island archipelago, New Zealand accumulated bird diversity.

The mix includes species with unusual biology such as the kākāpō, which is the world's only flightless, nocturnal parrot and exhibits competitive display breeding using leks.

There are also many species that are similar to neighbouring land areas. A process of colonisation, speciation and extinction has been at play over many millions of years, including recent times. Some species have arrived in human recorded history, while others arrived earlier but are little changed.

== Mammals ==
Prior to human settlement, the mammals of New Zealand consisted entirely of several species of bat and several dozen marine mammal species. Far earlier, during the Miocene, at least one "archaic" terrestrial mammal species is known to have existed, the Saint Bathans mammal. The Māori brought the kurī (Polynesian Dog) and kiore (Polynesian rat) in about 1250 CE, and Europeans from 1769 onwards brought the pig, mice, two additional species of rats, weasels, stoats, ferrets and possums and many other species, some of which cause conservation problems for indigenous species.

== Reptiles ==
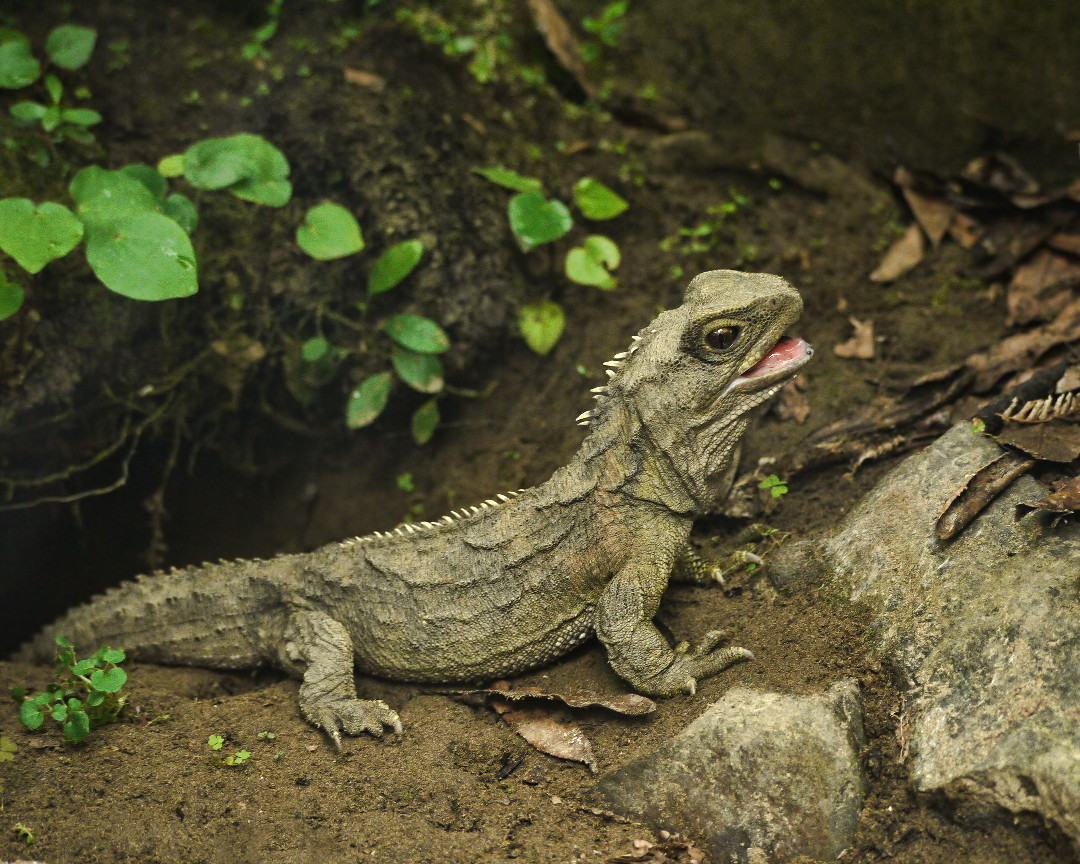
A tuatara, sometimes described as a "living fossil"

The extant (living) reptiles of New Zealand consist of numerous species of terrestrial lizards and the lizard-like tuatara, and several species of sea turtles and sea snakes. All but one species are native to New Zealand, and all but one of the terrestrial species are endemic to New Zealand, that is, they are not found in any other country. Many species of foreign reptiles enter New Zealand through accidental importation or smuggling, but only the Australian native Lampropholis delicata (rainbow skink or plague skink) has become established in the wild, and it is considered an invasive pest.

Long-extinct taxa include numerous dinosaurs and other Mesozoic reptiles that are known from fossils found in New Zealand.

== Amphibians ==
All of the amphibians of New Zealand are either from the endemic genus Leiopelma or are one of the introduced species, of which three are extant. Pepeketua is the eponymized Māori word.

== Insects ==
=== Wētā ===
Wētā (also spelled weta in English) is the common name for a group of about 100 insect species in the families Anostostomatidae and Rhaphidophoridae endemic to New Zealand. They are giant flightless crickets, and some are among the heaviest insects in the world. Generally nocturnal, most small species are carnivores and scavengers while the larger species are herbivorous. Although some endemic birds (and tuatara) likely prey on them, wētā are disproportionately preyed upon by introduced mammals, and some species are now critically endangered.

=== Stick insects ===
Stick insects in New Zealand are found in a range of different environments, from cold high alpine areas to dry coastal forest. There are between 17 and 23 different species recognised, from 10 genera. The most common species of the stick insect in New Zealand is the smooth stick insect (Clitarchus hookeri) (Salmon 1991). Following Günther (1953), the New Zealand stick insects are placed into the subfamilies Phasmatinae (tribe: Acanthoxylini) and Pachymorphinae (tribe: Pachymorphinini). Classification and identification is based on Jewell & Brock (2002) and 2015.

This is a list of currently recognised stick insects in New Zealand:

=== Butterflies ===
The butterflies of New Zealand include twelve endemic species, as well as several introduced and migrant species. Lepidoptera, which includes the butterflies and moths, is the third largest insect order in New Zealand.

== Spiders ==
New Zealand has an estimated 2,000 species of spiders, with over 1,100 species described scientifically. Over 90% are endemic, with the approximately 70 non-endemic species being introduced through association with humans or by natural processes such as ballooning.

The New Zealand spider with the largest leg span is the Nelson cave spider (Spelungula cavernicola), with a leg span of up to 13 centimetres (5.1 in) and a body length of about 3 centimetres (1.2 in).

The flat huntsman spider (Delena cancerides), called the Avondale spider in New Zealand, was accidentally introduced from Australia in the early 1920s, possibly in shipments of hardwood logs used for railway sleepers. It is considered harmless to humans, and individuals have been collected for use in at least two films.

Very few New Zealand spiders have bites that can cause significant injury to humans, and, of these, only one – the katipō – is endemic. Katipō bites have been known to cause systemic effects, such as hypertension, seizure, or coma, though no deaths as a result of katipō bites have been recorded for over 200 years. Its more dangerous close relative, the venomous Australian redback spider, has established a foothold in some parts of New Zealand, notably in Taranaki and Central Otago. The Australian white-tailed spider, first recorded in New Zealand in 1886, has been falsely attributed as the cause of many necrotising spider bites.

== Crustaceans ==
In the waters in and around New Zealand, 77 living species of crabs (and 10 species of crab-like Anomura) have been recorded, along with a further 24 species of fossil crabs (marked with an obelisk). Of the extant crabs, 37 are endemic to New Zealand (marked in boldface). The taxonomy below follows Ng et al. (2008) for the extant species, and De Grave et al. (2009) for the fossils.

Almost all the species are marine, with a single freshwater species, Amarinus lacustris (Hymenosomatidae). An updated checklist published in 2010 lists 167 species of Brachyura, plus a little over 50 species of crab-like Anomura. This list (of N.Z. Decapoda) has been republished with annotations in 2011.

== Molluscs ==
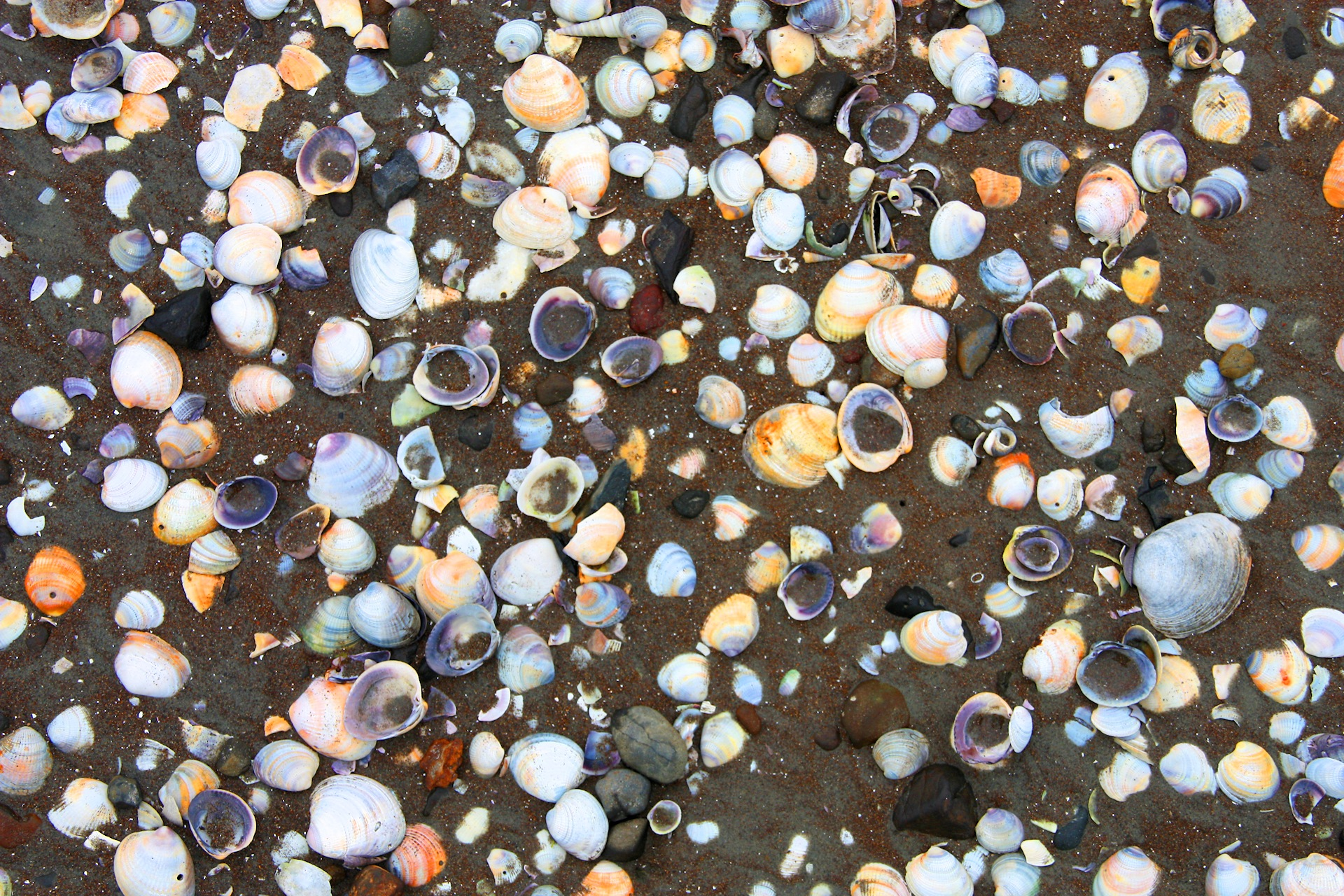
Diversity of marine mollusc shells at Akaroa Beach

=== List of marine molluscs of New Zealand ===
Marine molluscs include marine gastropods (sea snails and sea slugs), bivalves (such as pipis, cockles, oysters, mussels, scallops), octopuses, squid and other classes of Mollusca. This list does not include the land and freshwater species.

=== List of non-marine molluscs of New Zealand ===
Non-marine molluscs of New Zealand include gastropods, such as land snails, and freshwater molluscs (or shellfish), such as freshwater mussels. Among the best known are the large native forest snails such as the Paryphanta (kauri snails) and Powelliphanta.

== Invasive species ==
Humans first arrived via the Pacific islands, in several waves at some time before 1300 AD, bringing with them the Polynesian rat (kiore) and the domesticated dog. Europeans later brought pigs, ferrets, stoats, mice, rats, dogs, cats, sheep, cattle, and many other mammals. Of these, the rats, ferrets, cats, stoats and dogs have all seriously impacted the New Zealand fauna, driving some species to extinction. Brushtail possums were introduced from Australia for a fur industry, and deer from Europe as game animals, both seriously damaging the forest habitat of many birds.

Since the 1910's, successful efforts have been made to remove possums, rats, ferrets, and other mammals from many large and small offshore islands in an effort to return these places to something more closely resembling their pre-human state. Between 1982 and 1986, trappers eliminated all remaining possums from Kapiti Island, for example: over 20,000 were removed. In 1996, all rats on the island were eliminated using an aerial application of brodifacoum. Similarly, efforts are being made to control such species in selected locations on the mainland. In a further step, in certain mainland reserves mammals are being eliminated within predator-proof fences creating ecological islands. Examples are Zealandia in Wellington city, from which about a ton of dead possums was removed after the installation of a mammal-proof fence, and the Maungatautari Restoration Project.

== See also ==
- Animal welfare in New Zealand
- Biodiversity of New Zealand
- Conservation in New Zealand
- Flora of New Zealand

== Sources ==
- Buckley, T. R.; Attanayake, D.; Nylander, J. A.; Bradler, S. (2010). "The phylogenetic placement and biogeographical origins of the New Zealand stick insects (Phasmatodea)". Systematic Entomology. 35 (2): 207–225. Bibcode:2010SysEn..35..207B. doi:10.1111/j.1365-3113.2009.00505.x.
- Günther, K. (1953). "Über die taxonomische Gliederung und die geographische Verbreitung der Insektenordnung der Phasmatodea". Beiträge zur Entomologie. 3 (5). Berlin: 541–563.
- Jewell, Tony; Brock, Paul D. (2002). "A review of the New Zealand stick insects: new genera and synonymy, keys, and a catalogue". Journal of Orthoptera Research. 11 (2): 189–197. doi:10.1665/1082-6467(2002)011[0189:arotnz]2.0.co;2. ISSN 1082-6467.
- Salmon, J. T (1991). The stick insects of New Zealand. Raupo.
