= Queen crab =

Queen crab may refer to:

- Chionoecetes, a genus of crabs known in Canada as queen crab
- Tasmanian giant crab, Pseudocarcinus gigas, also known in Australia as queen crab
