= Huriwai Measures Formation =

Late Jurassic geologic formation in New Zealand

- Stratigraphic range: Tithonian
- Type: Geological formation
- Unit of: Huriwai Group
- Underlies: Matira Sandstone and Kaihu Group
- Overlies: Waikorea Siltstone
- Thickness: 1,500 metres (4,900 ft)

Lithology
- Primary: Breccia, conglomerates, and sandstone
- Other: Coal

Location
- Coordinates: 37.390°S 174.729°E
- Region: Waikato River
- Country: New Zealand

Type section
- Named by: Ferdinand von Hochstetter
- Year defined: 1864

The Huriwai Measures Formation is a geological formation in New Zealand, dating to the Late Jurassic (Tithonian).

It is one of two geological formations in New Zealand where dinosaur fossils have been found, with the other being the Late Cretaceous-aged Tahora Formation.

== History ==
Ferdinand von Hochstetter discovered the Huriwai Measures Formation during the Austrian Novara expedition to New Zealand in 1857, and he later described the formation in 1864.

Plant fossils were then identified from the formation by Purser (1961), and the first tetrapod fossil (specimen AU13802) was discovered in the formation in 1995. AU13802 was identified by Molnar, Wiffen & Hayes (1998) as a phalanx bone probably belonging to a theropod dinosaur, making it the first dinosaur fossil from the Jurassic to be discovered in New Zealand.

== Description ==
Plant fossils found in the Huriwai Measures Formation suggest that it was a forested environment. Ballance & Campbell (1993) have also suggested it to have been a braided floodplain delta because the region was subject to volcanic ash falls from a distant volcano.

== Fossil content ==
=== Flora ===
Plants recovered from the Huriwai Measures Formation include Cladophlebis, Equisetum, Taeniopteris, conifers, and liverworts.

=== Fauna ===
| Genus | Species | Location | Stratigraphic position | Material | Notes | Image |
|---|---|---|---|---|---|---|
| Bivalvia | Indeterminate | | | | Believed to be nonmarine. | |
| Mollusca | Indeterminate | | | | Believed to be nonmarine. | |
| Theropoda? | Indeterminate | Port Waikato | | "Phalanx." | The bone is stained black, and possible coprolites have also been assigned to this species. It is sometimes incorrectly referred to Compsognathidae. | |

== See also ==
- List of dinosaur-bearing rock formations
- South Polar region of the Cretaceous
- List of dinosaurs and other Mesozoic reptiles of New Zealand
