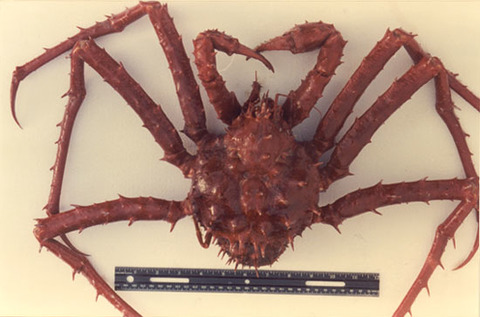
- Dorsal view of Neolithodes agassizii
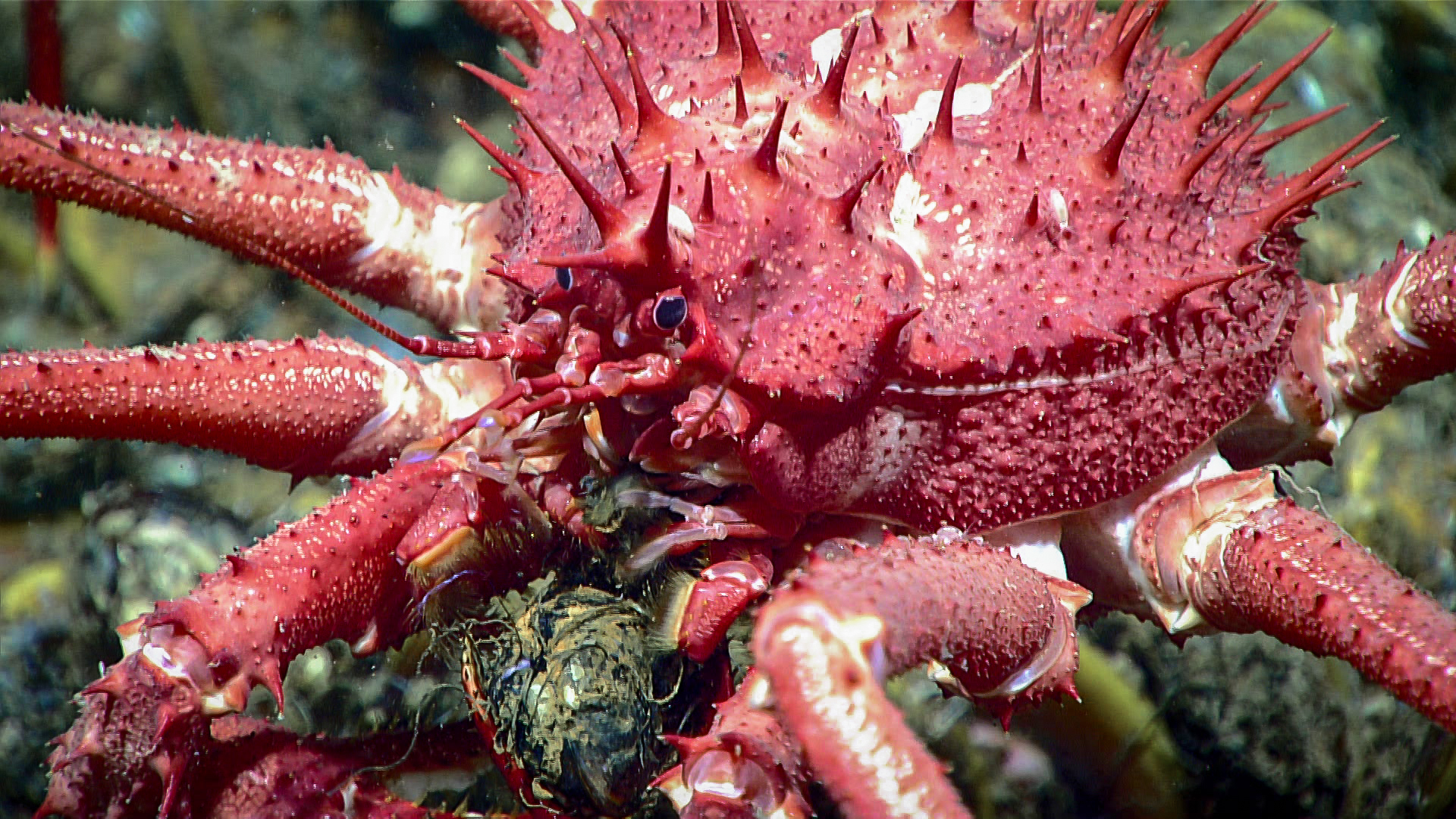
- Neolithodes agassizii eating a mussel

Scientific classification
- Kingdom: Animalia
- Phylum: Arthropoda
- Class: Malacostraca
- Order: Decapoda
- Suborder: Pleocyemata
- Infraorder: Anomura
- Family: Lithodidae
- Genus: Neolithodes
- Species: N. agassizii

Binomial name
- Neolithodes agassizii (Smith, 1882)

Synonyms
- Lithodes agassizii Smith, 1882

= Neolithodes agassizii =

Species of king crab

Neolithodes agassizii is a species of king crab native to the Western Atlantic which lives at depths of 200–1,900 metres (660–6,230 ft).

== Description ==
Neolithodes agassizii has a pyriform carapace; the largest adult specimen when it was described, a female, had a carapace measuring 123 mm (4.8 in) in postrostral length and 117 mm (4.6 in) in width. Whereas its carapace is about 9/10 as wide as it is long in adults, this is closer to 8/10 in juveniles. The spines around the margins of its carapace are slightly larger than those on its dorsal surface, and between these marginal spines are tubercles. Its rostrum is very short. Its chelipeds feature little spination and are similar in length, but the right is stouter than the left. Its rear walking legs – the longest pair – are nearly three times as long as the carapace width, and all of its dactyli are slightly curved and armed with small, sharp spines. Its underside features a symmetrical abdomen in juveniles, but in adults, there is a noticeable asymmetry in the third, fourth, and fifth segments: the left side is well-developed at the expense of the right side. Its second abdominal segment bears prominent spines.

== Distribution ==
Neolithodes agassizii is known from depths of 200–1,900 metres (660–6,230 ft). and have been found as far south as Rio de Janeiro, as far north as latitude 36°, and near the Equator. It has been found in the southwestern Caribbean Sea as well as the Gulf of Mexico.

== See also ==
- Neolithodes grimaldii, a species which small specimens of N. agassizii may be confused for
- Neolithodes indicus, a species originally misidentified as N. agassizii
