= Acanthocyclus =

Scientific classification
- Domain: Eukaryota
- Kingdom: Animalia
- Phylum: Arthropoda
- Class: Malacostraca
- Order: Decapoda
- Suborder: Pleocyemata
- Infraorder: Brachyura
- Family: Belliidae
- Subfamily: Belliinae
- Genus: Acanthocyclus; Lucas, 1844

Genus of crabs

Acanthocyclus is a genus of crabs belonging to the family Belliidae.

The species of this genus are found in Southern America.

Species:

- Acanthocyclus albatrossis Rathbun, 1898
- Acanthocyclus gayi Lucas, 1844
- Acanthocyclus hassleri Rathbun, 1898
