= Reptiles of New Zealand =

List of species

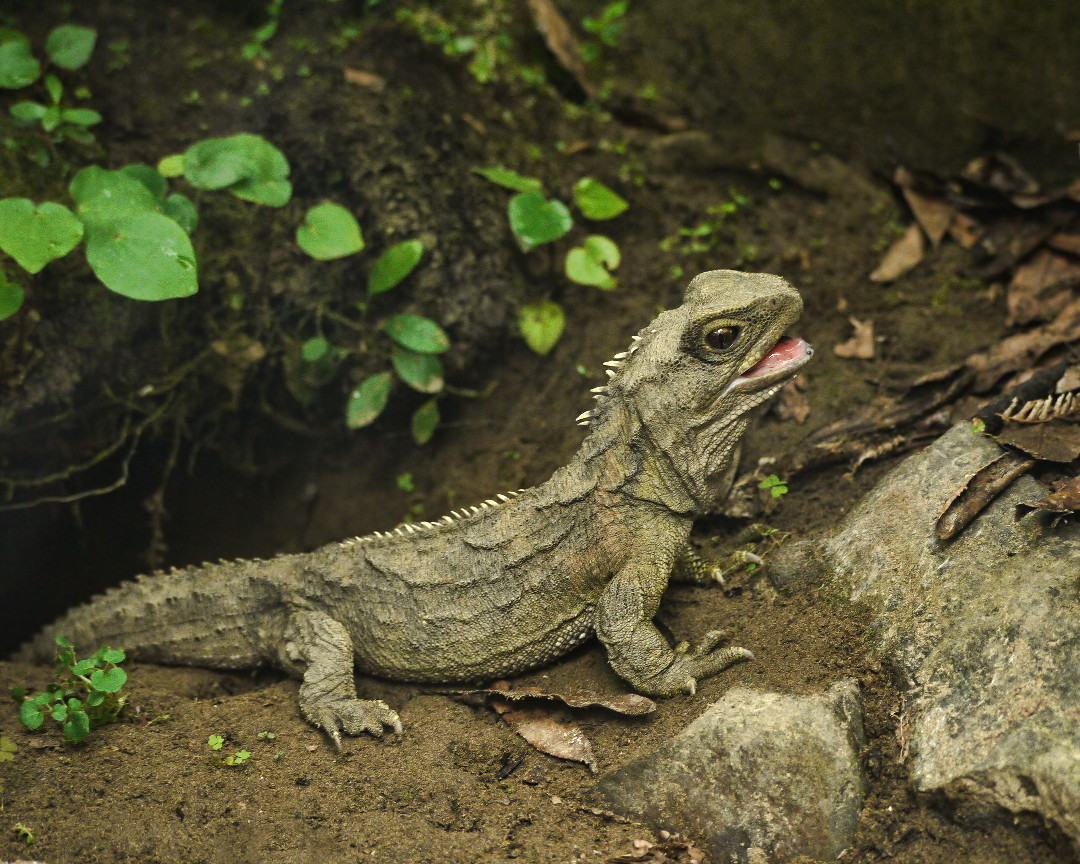
The tuatara looks like a lizard, but is not one.

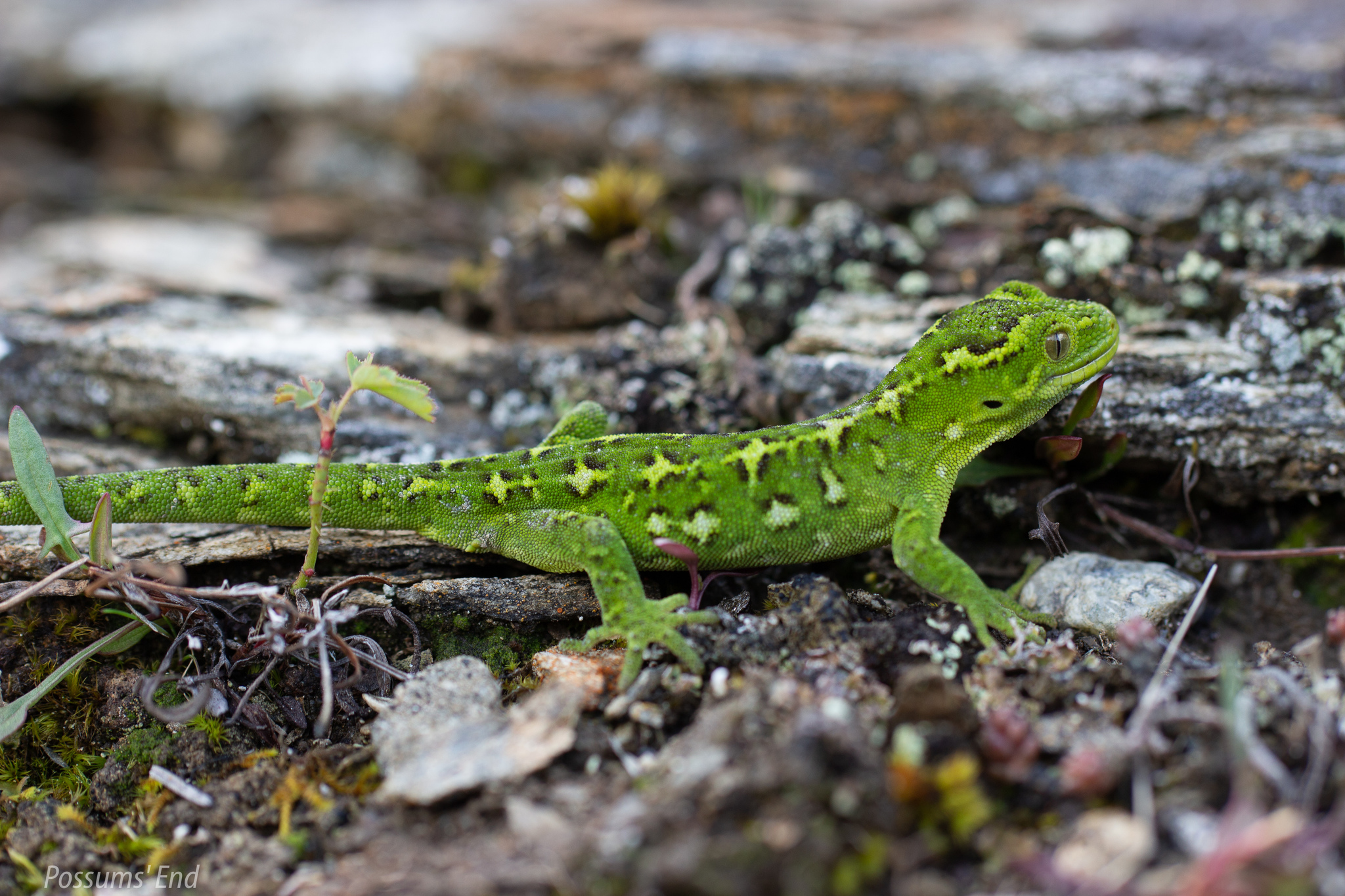
Jewelled gecko

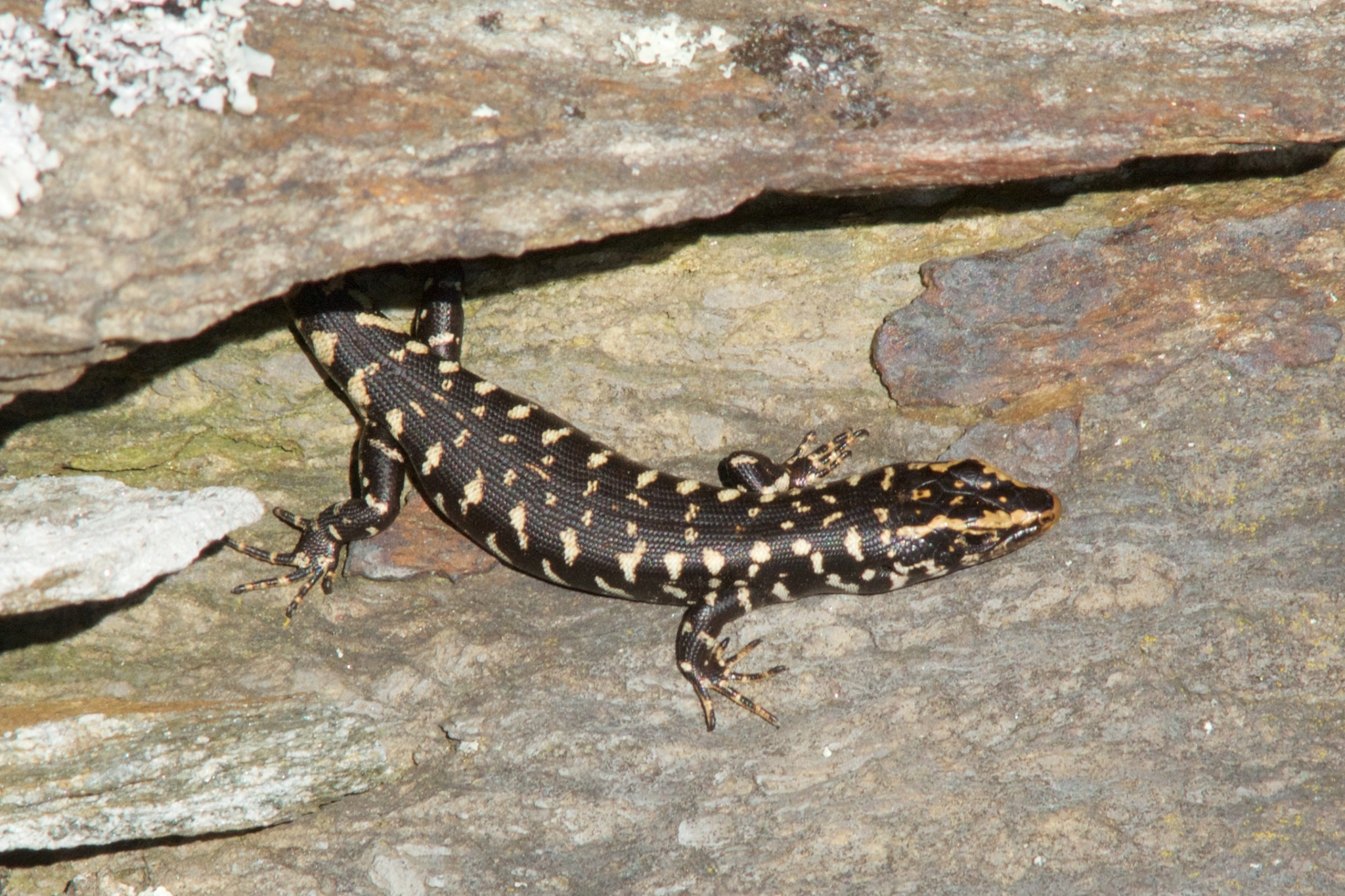
Otago skink

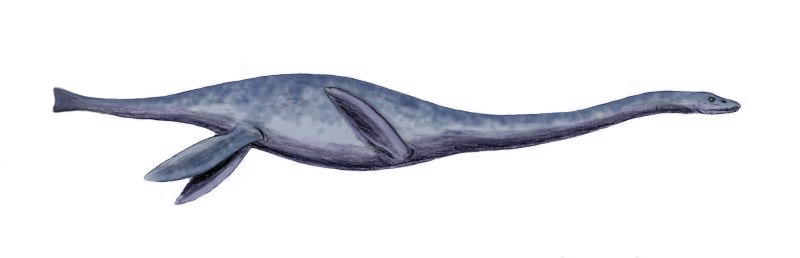
Mauisaurus haasti, a plesiosaur

The extant (living) reptiles of New Zealand consist of numerous species of terrestrial lizards and the lizard-like tuatara, and several species of sea turtles and sea snakes. All but one species are native to New Zealand, and all but one of the terrestrial species are endemic to New Zealand, that is, they are not found in any other country. Many species of foreign reptiles enter New Zealand through accidental importation or smuggling, but only the Australian native Lampropholis delicata (rainbow skink or plague skink) has become established in the wild, and it is considered an invasive pest.

Long-extinct taxa include numerous dinosaurs and other Mesozoic reptiles that are known from fossils found in New Zealand.

== Taxa ==
Modern taxa

- Lizards
  - Geckos – at least four dozen species, and probably more yet to be scientifically described
  - Skinks – over 70 endemic species in the Oligosoma genus, plus the introduced Lampropholis delicata (rainbow skink or plague skink)
- Tuatara – one unique species of this "living fossil" that looks like a lizard, but is not one.
- Sea turtles
  - Leatherback sea turtle (Dermochelys coriacea) – widespread around New Zealand
  - Green sea turtle (Chelonia mydas) – found around the northern North Island
  - Loggerhead sea turtle (Caretta caretta) – occasional visitor to the main islands of New Zealand
  - Hawksbill sea turtle (Eretmochelys imbricata) – rare visitor to the main islands
  - Olive ridley sea turtle (Lepidochelys olivacea) – rare straggler to New Zealand
- Sea snakes
  - Yellow-bellied sea snake (Hydrophis platurus) – occasional visitor to the northern half of New Zealand
  - Yellow-lipped sea krait or banded sea krait (Laticauda colubrina) – rare straggler to New Zealand
  - New Caledonian sea krait or Saint Giron's sea krait (Laticauda saintgironsi) – rare straggler to New Zealand
  - Blue-lipped sea krait or brown-lipped sea krait (Laticauda laticaudata) – extremely rare straggler to New Zealand

Extinct ancient taxa

Long-extinct taxa include numerous dinosaurs and other Mesozoic reptiles that are known from fossils found in New Zealand. The New Zealand mosasaur, named Moanasaurus, was one of the largest mosasaurs in the world. The New Zealand plesiosaur is named Mauisaurus.

== See also ==
- Frogs of New Zealand
- Fauna of New Zealand
- List of geckos of New Zealand
