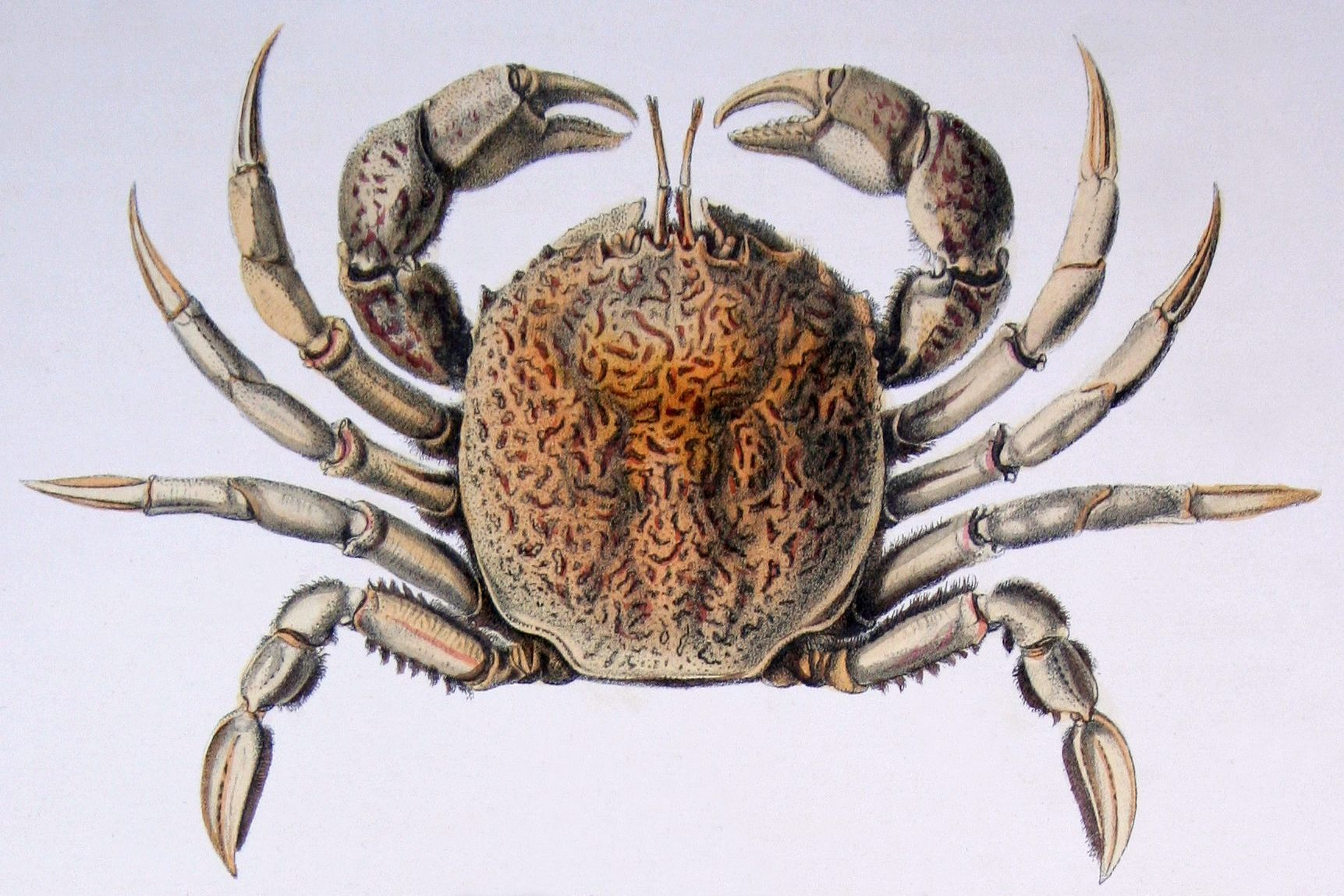

Scientific classification
- Kingdom: Animalia
- Phylum: Arthropoda
- Class: Malacostraca
- Order: Decapoda
- Suborder: Pleocyemata
- Infraorder: Brachyura
- Family: Belliidae
- Genus: Bellia; H. Milne-Edwards, 1848
- Species: B. picta

Binomial name
- Bellia picta H. Milne-Edwards, 1848

= Bellia =

Genus of crabs

Bellia picta is a species of crab that lives around the coasts of South America, and the only species in the genus Bellia. On the Atlantic coast, it is found in Rio Grande do Sul, Brazil, while on the Pacific coast, it is found off Peru and Chile. It probably lives in burrows and is a filter feeder.
