= Paralomis webberi =

Conservation status
- Data Deficit (NZ TCS)

Scientific classification
- Kingdom: Animalia
- Phylum: Arthropoda
- Class: Malacostraca
- Order: Decapoda
- Suborder: Pleocyemata
- Infraorder: Anomura
- Family: Lithodidae
- Genus: Paralomis
- Species: P. webberi

Binomial name
- Paralomis webberi Ahyong, 2010

Species of king crab

Holotype site: NMNZ Cr11141'"`UNIQ--ref-00000009-QINU`"'

Paralomis webberi is a species of king crab in the genus Paralomis. It is known from one specimen found off the coast of New Zealand.

== Description ==
Paralomis webberi is known only from a single, egg-carrying ("ovigerous") adult female holotype as of 2010. Its colour in life is not known. It has a pyriform carapace which, in the holotype, is 33.6 mm (1.32 in) long (Note: Using postorbital carapace length (pcl), which is measured from the rear margin of the orbit and therefore excludes the rostrum) and 29.2 mm (1.15 in) wide. Its rostrum is 7.4 mm (0.29 in) long, consisting of two median spines and a pair of outward-diverging spines, all angled obliquely upward, and nine spinules on an angular lobe underneath. The major cheliped is 1.31 times the carapace length and the minor cheliped 1.26 times. The first pair of walking legs are the longest at 1.33 times the carapace length.

The dorsal carapace, abdomen, chelipeds, and walking legs are all densely covered in slender spines. The carapace is uniformly covered in spines of similar size, while those on the abdomen become progressively shorter toward the anterior – eventually shrinking to blunt, setose tubercles on the semicircular telson. The coxae of the chelipeds and walking legs are unarmed, and the chelae and dactyli feature spines proximally but tufts of golden setae distally. The other segments of the chelipeds are spinose except the dorsal and ventral surfaces of the ischiobasis and the inner ("mesial") surface of the merus; the other segments of the walking legs are spinose except the ventral surface of the merus.

== Distribution ==
As of 2010, only one Paralomis webberi specimen has been identified. It was trawled in September 1998 from the Rumble III Seamount northeast of New Zealand between a depth of 632–1,255 m (2,073–4,117 ft). It is unknown if the specimen was taken from one of the seamount's active hydrothermal vent sites. Due to insufficient data, P. webberi's conservation status is unknown.

== Taxonomy ==
Paralomis webberi was described by carcinologist Shane T. Ahyong in 2010 and is named for Rick Webber of the Museum of New Zealand Te Papa Tongarewa. The holotype, an adult female preserved in Te Papa, was found on the Rumble III Seamount in 1998. It closely resembles P. echidna, with only subtle distinctions.

== See also ==
- List of crabs of New Zealand
