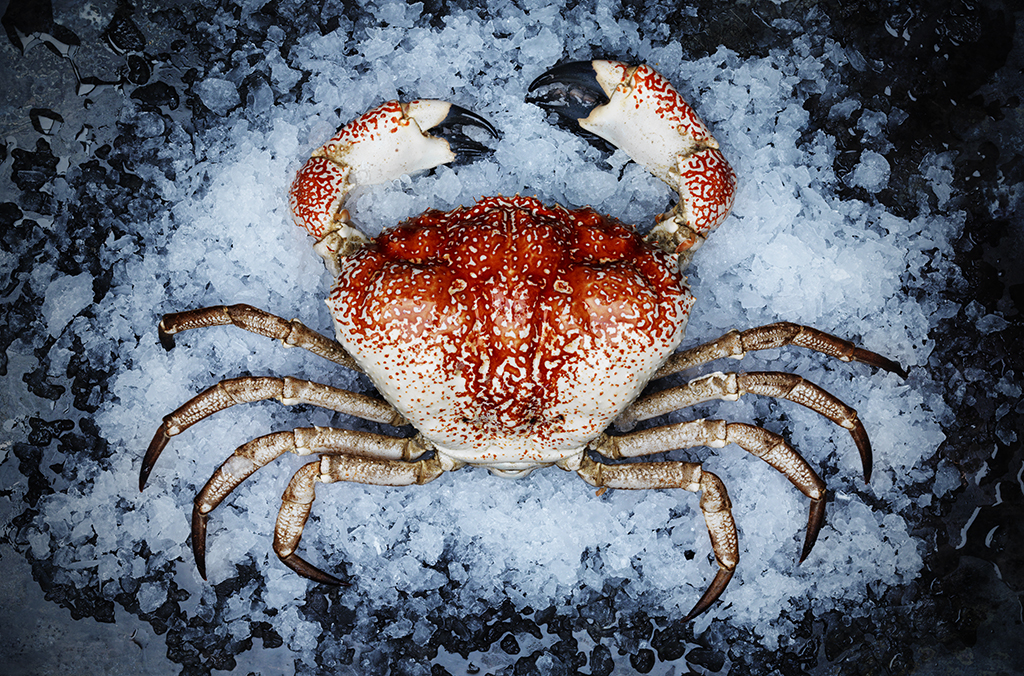

Scientific classification
- Kingdom: Animalia
- Phylum: Arthropoda
- Clade: Pancrustacea
- Class: Malacostraca
- Order: Decapoda
- Suborder: Pleocyemata
- Infraorder: Brachyura
- Family: Pseudocarcinidae
- Genus: Pseudocarcinus
- Species: P. gigas

Binomial name
- Pseudocarcinus gigas (Lamarck, 1818)

Synonyms
- Cancer gigas Lamarck, 1818

= Tasmanian giant crab =

Species of crab

The Tasmanian giant crab (Pseudocarcinus gigas), also known as the Tasmanian king crab, giant deepwater crab, giant southern crab, queen crab, or bullcrab, is a very large species of crab that resides on rocky and muddy bottoms in the oceans off Southern Australia. It is the only extant species in the genus Pseudocarcinus, the family Pseudocarcinidae, and the superfamily Pseudocarcinoidea.

== Habitat ==
The Tasmanian giant crab lives on rocky and muddy bottoms in the oceans off Southern Australia on the edge of the continental shelf at depths of 20–820 metres (70–2,690 ft). It is most abundant at 110–180 metres (360–590 ft) in the summer and 190–400 metres (620–1,310 ft) in the winter. The seasonal movements generally follow temperature as it prefers 12–14 °C (54–57 °F). The full temperature range where the species can be seen appears to be 10–18 °C (50–64 °F).

== Description ==
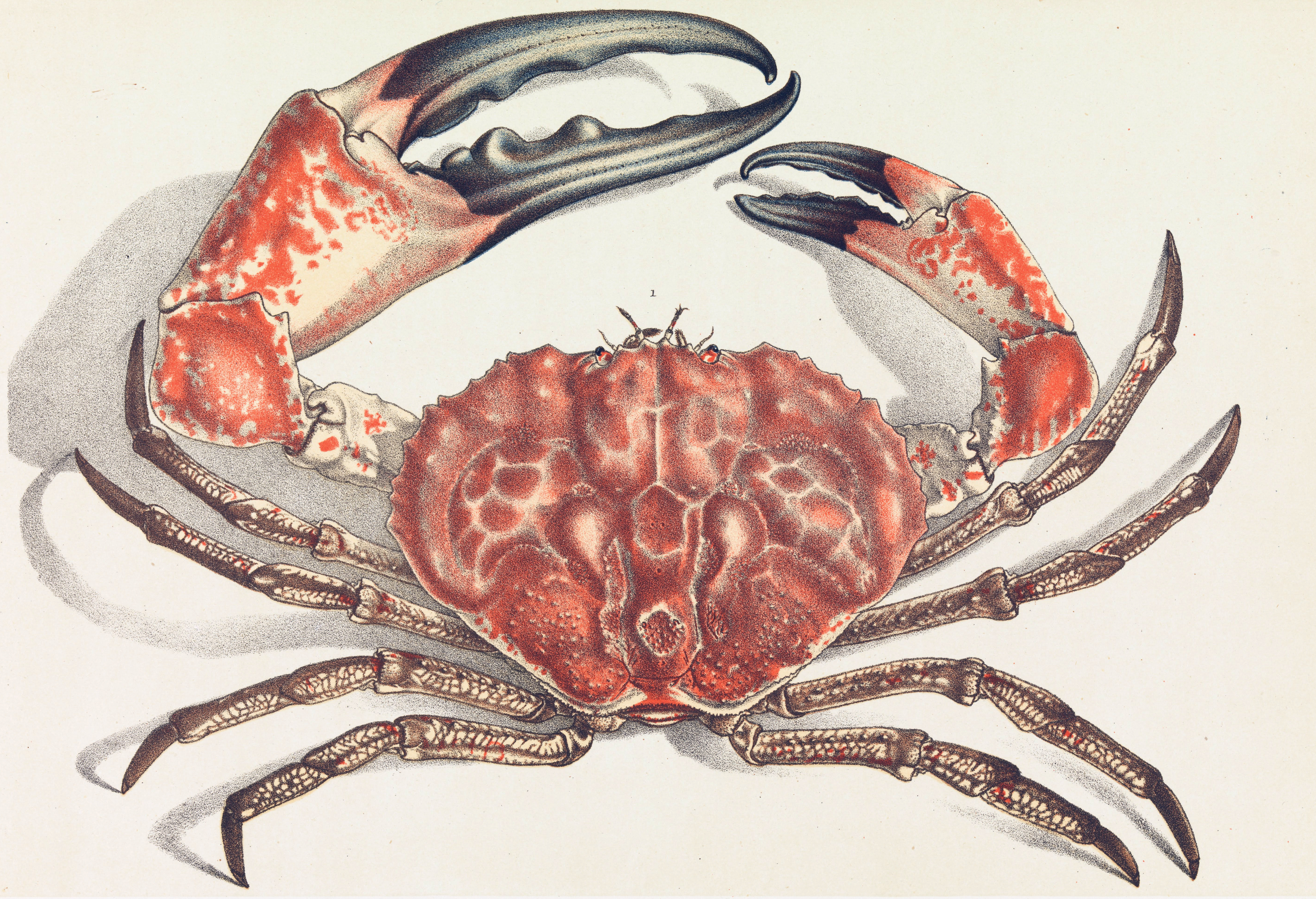
Lithograph of a male Pseudocarcinus gigas.

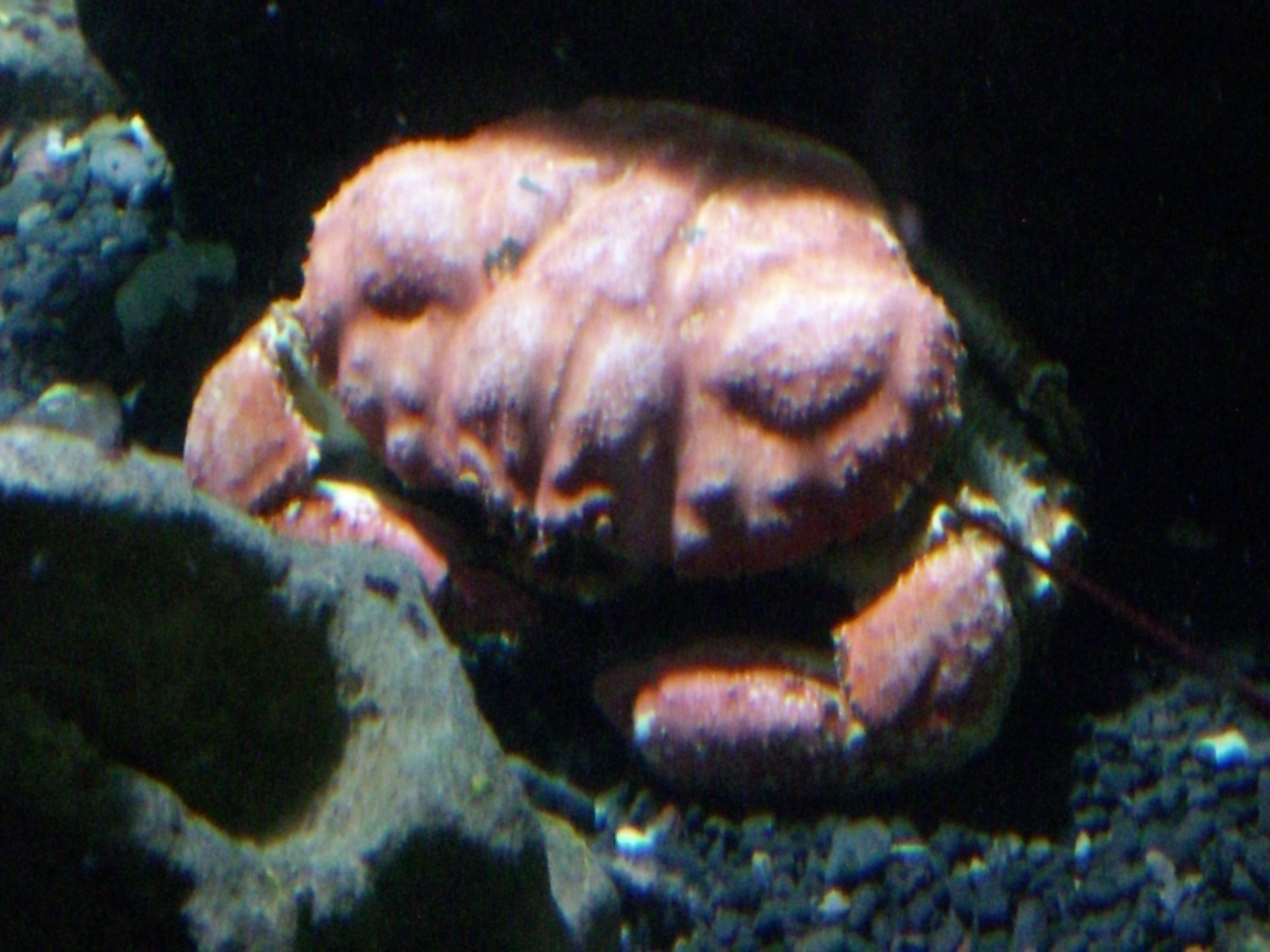
Tasmanian giant crab in Sydney Aquarium, Australia

The Tasmanian giant crab is one of the largest crabs in the world, reaching a mass of 17.6 kg (39 lb) and a carapace width of up to 46 cm (18 in). Among crabs, only the Japanese spider crab (Macrocheira kaempferi) can weigh more. Male Tasmanian giant crabs reach more than twice the size of females, which do not exceed 7 kg (15 lb). Males have one normal-sized and one oversized claw (which can be longer than the carapace width), while both claws are normal-sized in females. This crab is mainly whitish-yellow below and red above; the tips of the claws are black. Small individuals are yellowish-and-red spotted above. Its also called Pseudocarcinus gigas..

== Behaviour ==
The Tasmanian giant crab feeds on carrion and slow-moving species, including gastropods, crustaceans (anomura and brachyura) and starfish. Cannibalism also occurs. They breed in June and July, and the female carries the 0.5–2 million eggs for about four months. After hatching, the planktonic larvae float with the current for about two months before settling on the bottom. The species is long-lived and slow-growing; juveniles moult their carapace every three-four years and adult females about once every nine years. This greatly limits the breeding frequency, as mating is only possible in the period immediately after the old carapace has been shed, and the new is still soft.

== Fishery ==
The Tasmanian giant crab has been commercially fished in Tasmanian waters since 1992 and a minimum size was established in Australia in 1993. Fishing is typically by pots in water deeper than 140 m (460 ft). Following concerns surrounding the sustainability of catch numbers, the total allowable catch was adjusted for 2024/25 quota year to 20.7 tonnes (46,000 lb). valued at about A$2 million. The Tasmanian giant crab is very long-lived and slow-growing, making it vulnerable to overfishing. Before export, they are sometimes kept alive in tanks with water that is 10–14 °C (50–57 °F).
