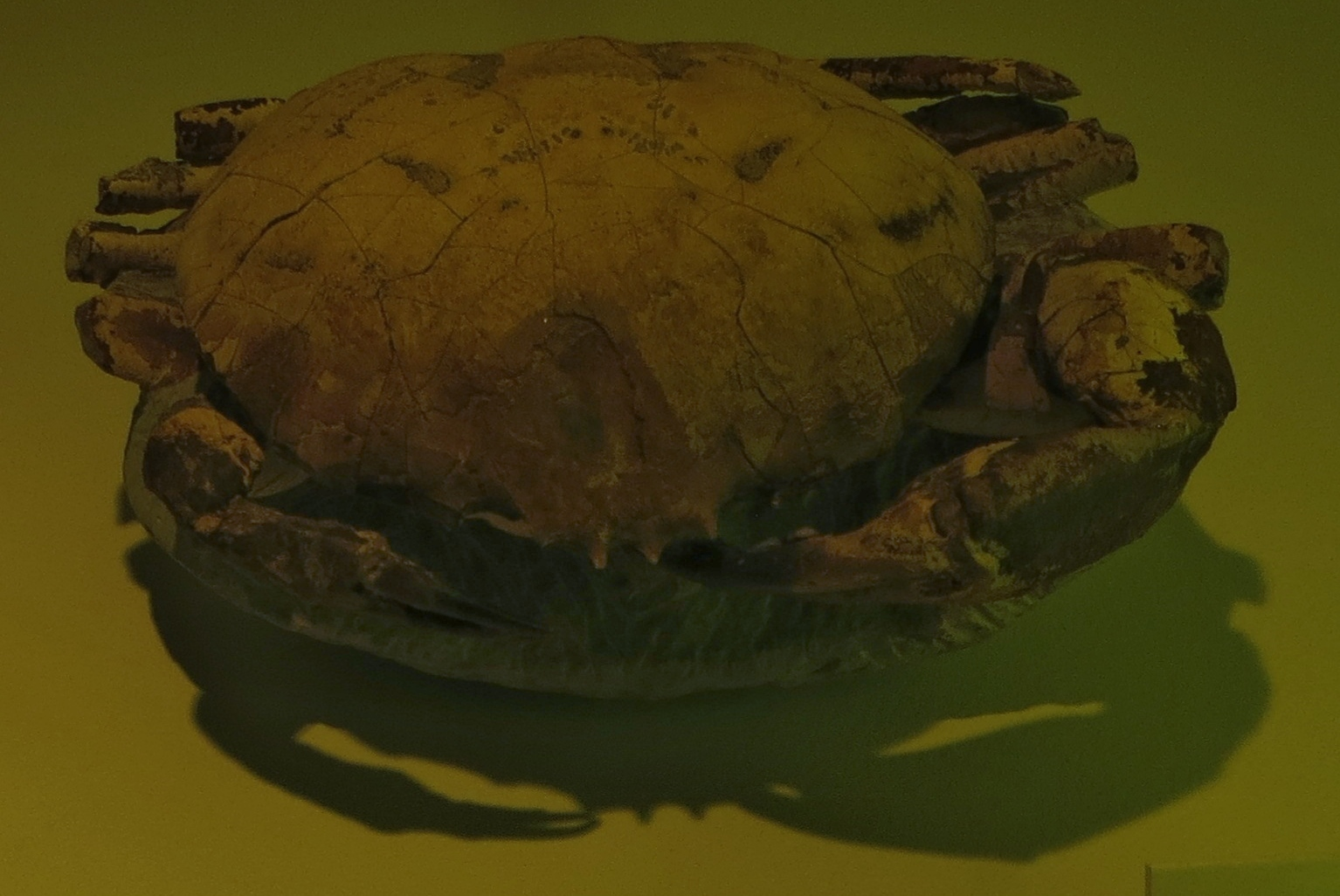
- Tumidocarcinus giganteus fossil

Scientific classification
- Kingdom: Animalia
- Phylum: Arthropoda
- Class: Malacostraca
- Order: Decapoda
- Suborder: Pleocyemata
- Infraorder: Brachyura
- Family: †Tumidocarcinidae
- Genus: †Tumidocarcinus (*Glaessner, 1960)

= Tumidocarcinus =

Tumidocarcinus Temporal range: Eocene–Miocene

Crab genus

Tumidocarcinus is an extinct genus of large crabs in the family Tumidocarcinidae, containing the following species:

- Tumidocarcinus dentatus
- Tumidocarcinus foersteri
- Tumidocarcinus giganteus
- Tumidocarcinus tumidus
- Tumidocarcinus victoriensis

It is a host of the parasitic Kentrogonida barnacles.

== Fossil record ==
This genus is known in the fossil record from the Eocene to the Miocene epoch. Most species of Tumidocarcinus are known from New Zealand and Australia, however, T. foersteri is known from the La Meseta Formation from Seymour Island, Antarctica.
