= List of dinosaurs and other Mesozoic reptiles of New Zealand =

Dinosaurs and other Mesozoic reptiles that lived in what is now New Zealand

Although the evidence is rare, fossils reveal that there were Mesozoic reptiles, including non-avian dinosaurs in New Zealand. Possibly because it lacks the right conditions for fossilization, only fragmentary dinosaur remains have been found there. These fossils are often only a single bone or a piece of a bone, and thus the dinosaurs' species cannot be identified. By comparing the fossils with other, more complete remains from other areas it can be inferenced which family or order a given fossil belonged to. Marine fossils are more common than fossils of land animals in New Zealand because dead animals and plants are easily preserved in sand and mud. Therefore, some fossils of marine reptiles are complete enough to be assigned to a specific genus or species.

== Species list ==
So far, there have been fossils found in New Zealand that have been identified as coming from:

=== Non-avian dinosaurs ===
Name	Time	Formation	Location	Notes
Ankylosaur	Maastrichtian (Haumurian)	Tahora Formation		Probably a parankylosaur similar to Kunbarrasaurus
Compsognathid?	Tithonian (Puaroan or Ohauan)	Huriwai Measures Formation	Waikato River, Waikato	Known from phalanges. Associated with possible coprolites. It can’t be identified for certain, but the bones superficially resemble Compsognatids
Ornithopod	Maastrichtian (Haumurian)	Tahora Formation		Possibly an elasmarian
Joan Wiffen's theropod	Maastrichtian (Haumurian)	Tahora Formation		Refer to the linked article for sources
Titanosaur	Maastrichtian (Haumurian)	Tahora Formation		Known from a rib

Dinosaurs that lived in the Ross Dependency, a part of Antarctica within the Realm of New Zealand, include the tetanuran Cryolophosaurus. The Ross Dependency, unlike the Chatham Islands, is not actually part of New Zealand, and this is why it is excluded from the list above until sufficient evidence shows that it entered what was the sector of Gondwana that is now New Zealand. Newer fossils from a Cretaceous-Paleogene boundary fossil formation known as the Takatika Grit in the Chatham Islands include six or seven (possibly more) bones from dinosaurs, as well as numerous bones from early birds, but more information is needed about these to add them to the list.

=== Other Mesozoic reptiles ===
Fossils of other reptiles from the Mesozoic Era have also been found in New Zealand. These creatures include:

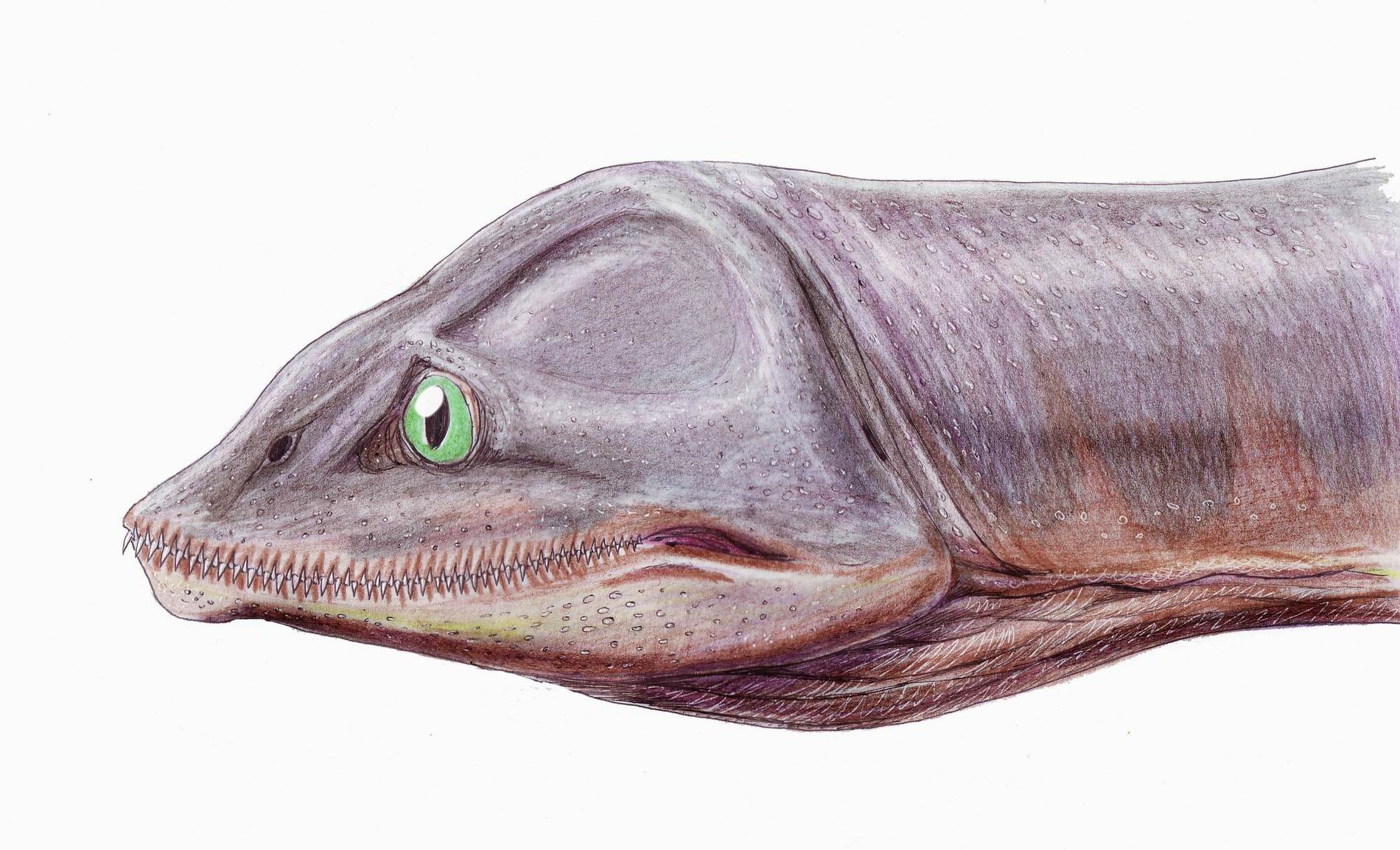
Kaiwhekea

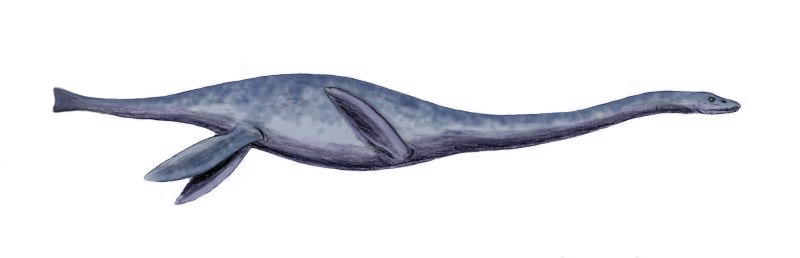
Mauisaurus

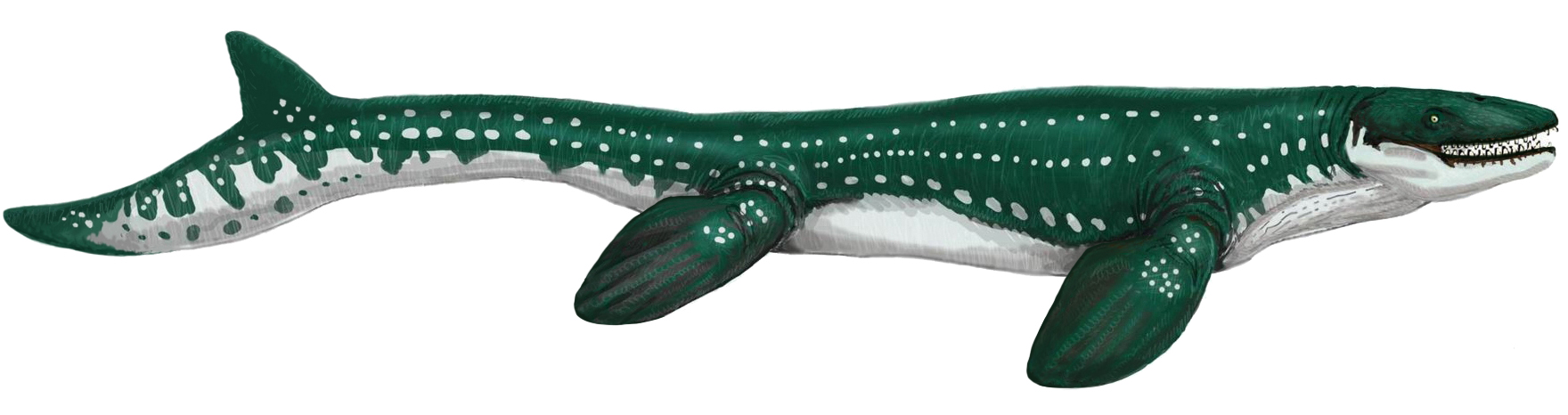
Prognathodon

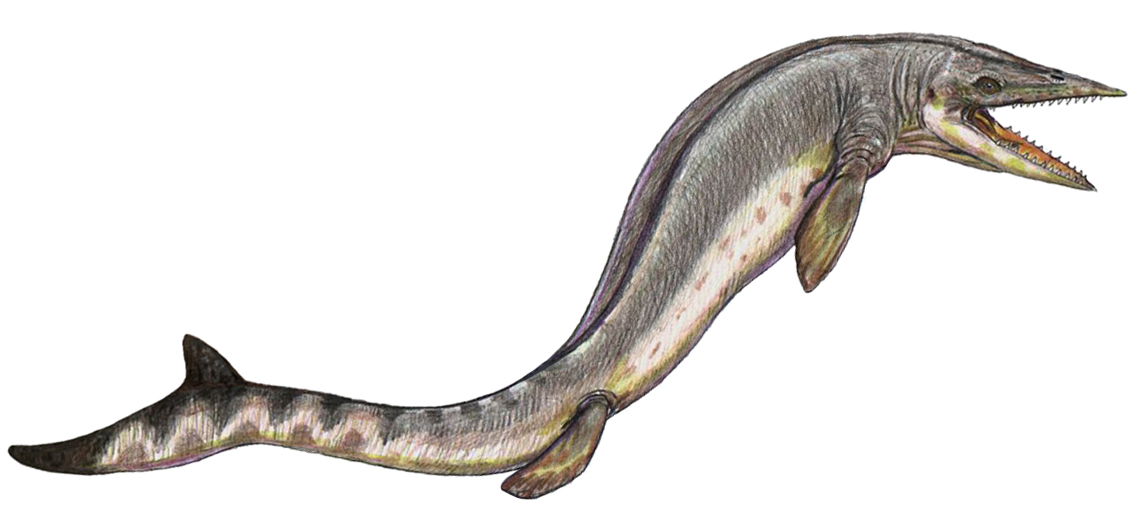
Taniwhasaurus

Name	Period	Formation	Area	Notes
Alexandronectes	Maastrichtian	Conway Formation	Canterbury	The first Plesiosaurus described from the Conway Formation
Eidolosaurus	Cretaceous			A mosasauroid outside of the mosasaurid family
"Hector's ichthyosaur" ("Ichthyosaurus" hectori)	Triassic	Torlesse Composite Terrane	Mount Potts	The first ichthyosaur reported from New Zealand. It is officially named as "Ichthyosaurus" hectori by Lydekker (1889), which is a replacement name for the previously used preoccupied name "Ichthyosaurus" australis, though the taxon is invalid and undiagnostic. Known from ribs, a partial humerus, a possible tooth and vertebral centra, the largest of which measured 45 cm (18 in) in diameter. With centra almost twice the diameter of those belonging to the largest ichthyosaur with preserved vertebrae, Shastasaurus sikanniensis, it may have been among the largest vertebrates to ever exist. These specimens can no longer be located, and may have been lost. A Canterbury Museum presentation mentioned unprepared giant ichthyosaur bones from Mount Potts.
Kaiwhekea	Late Cretaceous	Katiki Formation		An aristonectine plesiosaur
Liodon	Cretaceous			A dubious genus, the maximum length of this species is 30 feet (9.1 m).
Mauisaurus	Late Cretaceous	Conway Formation		A dubious genus; largest plesiosaur in New Zealand
Moanasaurus	Late Cretaceous	Tahora Formation		Largest mosasaur in New Zealand
Nothosaur	Triassic	Torlesse Composite Terrane		
Prognathodon	Cretaceous	Laidmore Formation		A large mosasaur
Pterosaur	Late Cretaceous			Discovered 1987. Possibly an azhdarchid.
Taniwhasaurus	Late Cretaceous	Conway Formation		A mosasaur
Tuarangisaurus	Late Cretaceous	Tahora Formation		An elasmosaurid

== See also ==
- Reptiles of New Zealand
- Geology of New Zealand
- New Zealand geologic time scale
