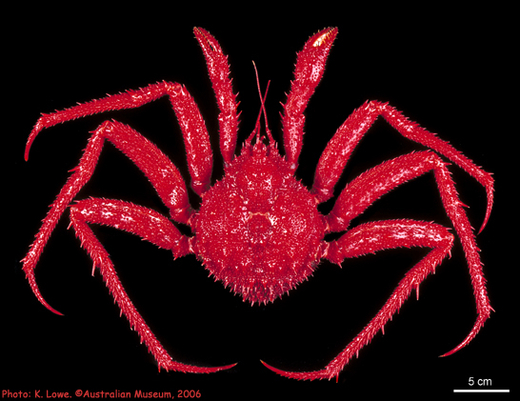

Scientific classification
- Kingdom: Animalia
- Phylum: Arthropoda
- Clade: Pancrustacea
- Class: Malacostraca
- Order: Decapoda
- Suborder: Pleocyemata
- Infraorder: Anomura
- Family: Lithodidae
- Genus: Neolithodes
- Species: N. flindersi

Binomial name
- Neolithodes flindersi Ahyong, 2010

= Neolithodes flindersi =

Species of king crab

Neolithodes flindersi is a species of king crab found in southeastern Australia. It has been found at depths of 887–1,333 metres (2,910–4,373 ft) but typically appears from 950–1,050 metres (3,120–3,440 ft). It most closely resembles Neolithodes brodiei and Neolithodes nipponensis.

== Description ==
Neolithodes flindersi is deep-red in colour – slightly more vivid dorsally than ventrally. The dorsal surface of its pyriform carapace is armed with scattered major spines and a dense, uniform cover of small, secondary spinules. The carapace is longer than it is wide by 1.01–1.15 times, with the largest specimen – the male holotype – reaching 126.1 mm (4.96 in) in postorbital length (Note: 183.3 mm (7.22 in) when including the rostrum) and 115.8 mm (4.56 in) in width.

Its walking legs are long and slender, and like in all Neolithodes, its third pair are the longest. Like the dorsal surface, the walking legs are densely covered with small spines in between the major ones. The coxae of the walking legs in males and juvenile females are covered in short, conical spines. The meral extensor spines of the walking legs are notably uniform in size rather than markedly uneven, distinguishing this species from its congeners. The secondary spines covering the surfaces of the walking legs are distinctly shorter compared to related species, with the spinulation extending in longitudinal rows along the ischium, merus, carpus, and propodus.

== Ecology ==
Neolithodes flindersi have been found to be parasitised by the snailfish genus Careproctus, who deposit eggs in the crabs' gill chambers. They have been found in Octocorallia corals such as Chrysogorgia orientalis.
