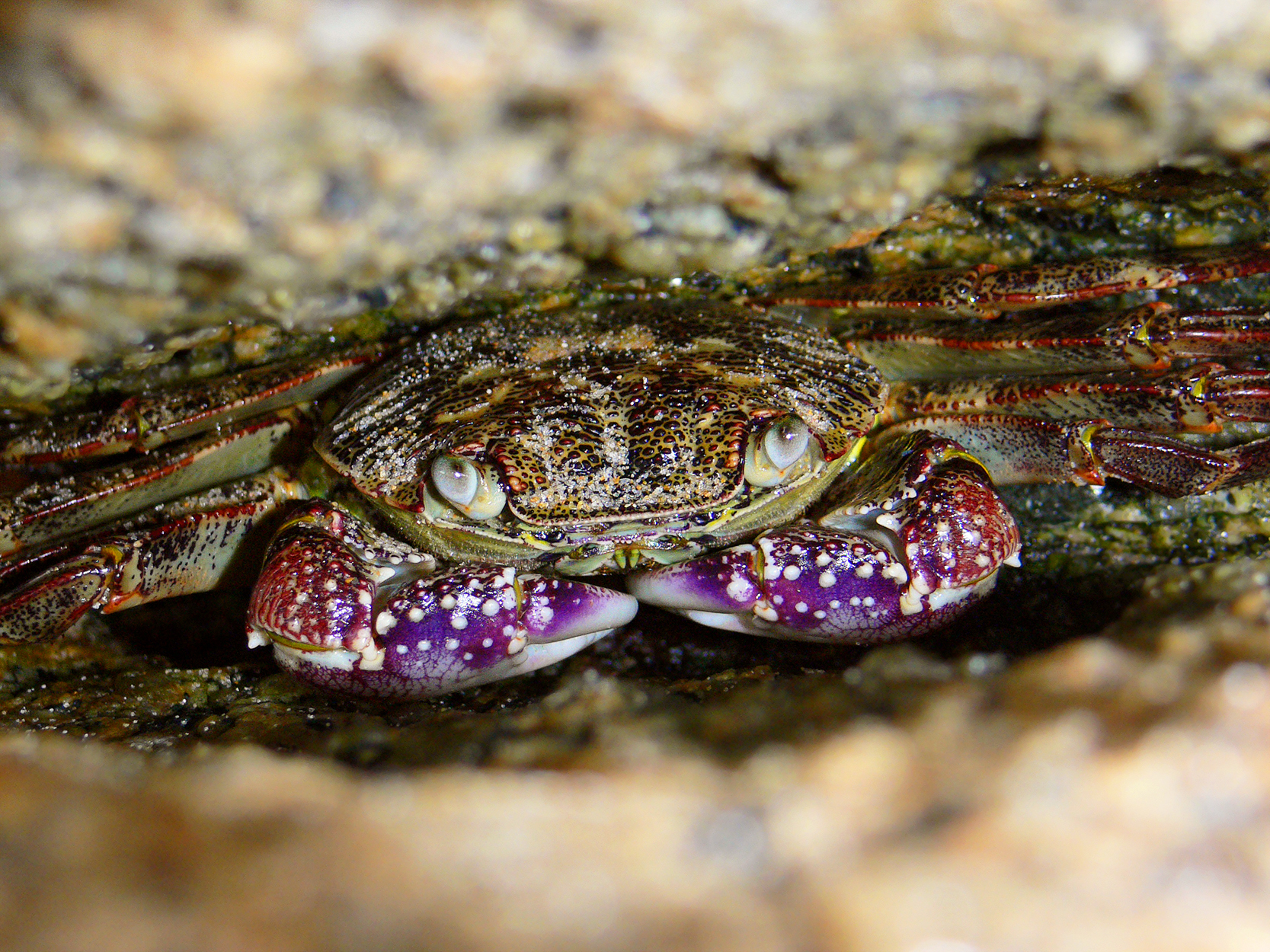

Scientific classification
- Kingdom: Animalia
- Phylum: Arthropoda
- Clade: Pancrustacea
- Class: Malacostraca
- Order: Decapoda
- Suborder: Pleocyemata
- Infraorder: Brachyura
- Family: Grapsidae
- Genus: Leptograpsus; H. Milne-Edwards, 1853
- Species: L. variegatus

Binomial name
- Leptograpsus variegatus (Fabricius, 1793)

= Leptograpsus =

Leptograpsus variegatus

Genus of crabs

Leptograpsus variegatus, known as the purple rock crab, is a marine large-eyed crab of the family Grapsidae, found in southern subtropical Indo-Pacific Oceans. It grows to around 50 millimetres (2.0 in) shell width. It is the only species in the genus Leptograpsus.

== Taxonomy ==
Leptograpsus variegatus was first described in 1793 as Cancer. variegatus. In 1803, C. variegatus was moved to the Grapsus genus and became Grapsus variegatus. In 1818, 1842 and 1852, L. variegatus was described again as Grapsus personatus, Grapsus strigilatus and Grapsus planifrons. In 1853, Henri Milne-Edwards erected the Leptograpsus genus and used G. variegatus as the type taxon. In his publication, Milne-Edwards recognized G. personatus, G. strigilatus and G. planifrons to be synonyms of L. variegatus. Milne-Edwards also described Leptograpsus ansoni, Leptograpsus gayi and Leptograpsus verreauxi, however these would later also be recognized as synonyms of L. variegatus.

== Description ==
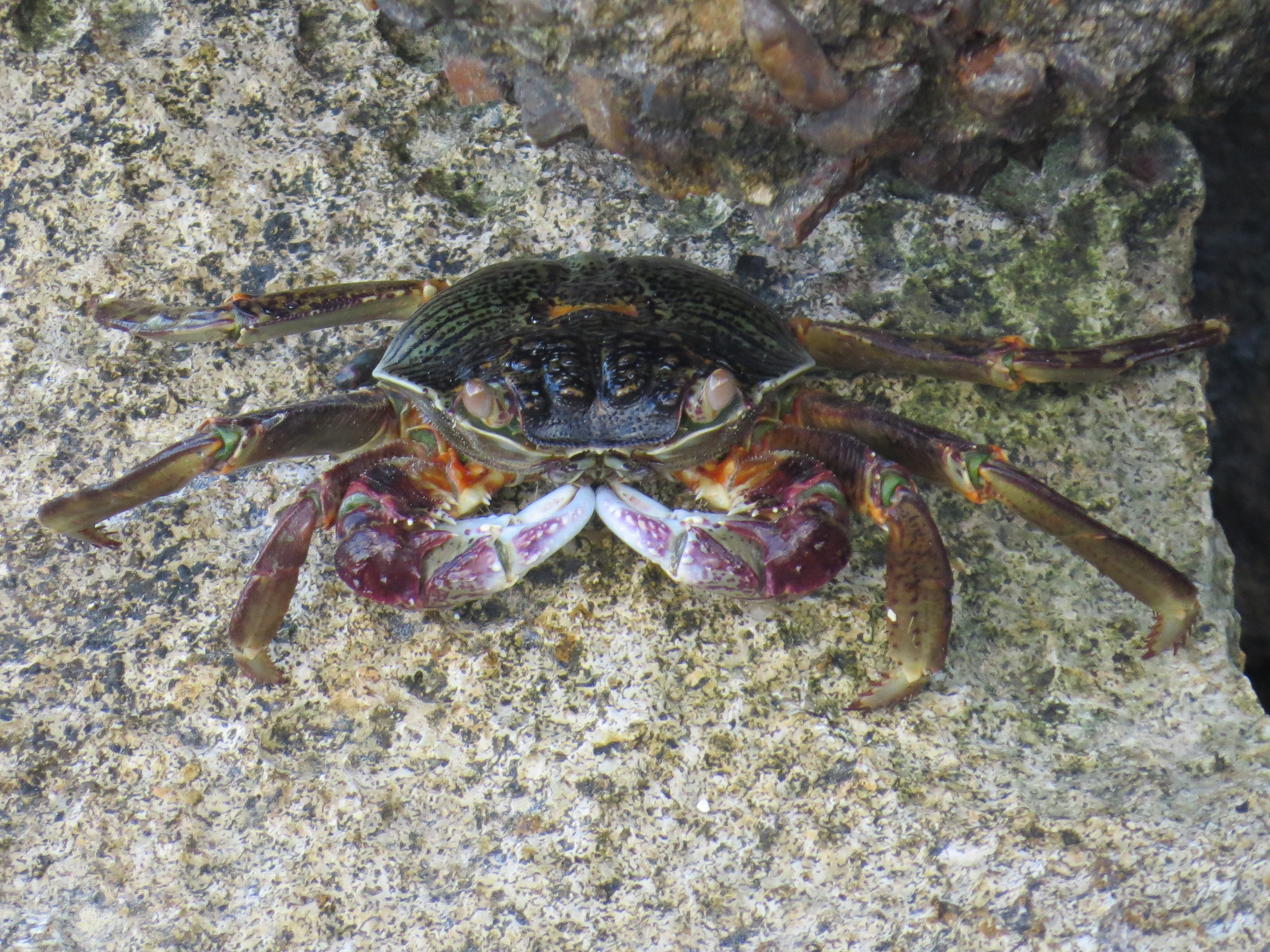
Leptograpsus variegatus

Individuals are large and may have a carapace that reaches up to 50mm in width. The crab has an overall purple colouration with a variable amount of white patterning when mature. Juveniles are a bluish grey colour with black patterning. The carapace is shaped somewhat like a square and eyes are relatively short. The body is smooth overall with no hairs.

When immature, the eggs are about 0.36mm in diameter and have a very dark brown colour. When the eggs are about to hatch, they are roughly 0.44x0.42mm and the eggs are light brown.

The first zoea of the crab are about 1.31mm in length.

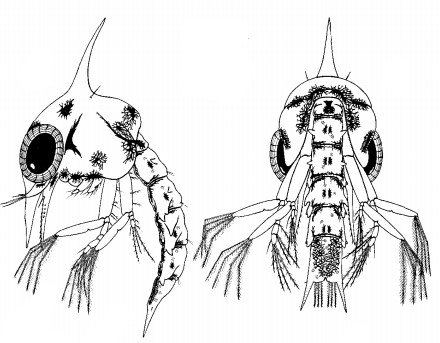
First zoea of Leptograpsus variegatus

== Distribution/habitat ==
Leptograpsus variegatus is known to occur in Australia (from western Australia to southern Australia), South America (from Peru to Chile), New Zealand and numerous islands in the Pacific Ocean. The crab lives in upper intertidal rocky zones and is often spotted running along exposed rock, hiding in cracks or under boulders.

== Life history ==
Adult females are known to carry eggs only in December. The females will incubate the eggs for roughly six weeks.

== Prey ==
Leptograpsus variegatus is an omnivore and will eat a broad range of plant and animal life. While the crab may eat algae growing on rocks (such as Corallina and Ulva lactuca), they have also been observed feeding on barnacles and limpets. The crab captures limpets by quickly placing their chelae under the limpets shell when it begins to move and then flips it over. Notably, there is also a single observation of this species preying upon a Raukawa gecko, which is native to New Zealand.

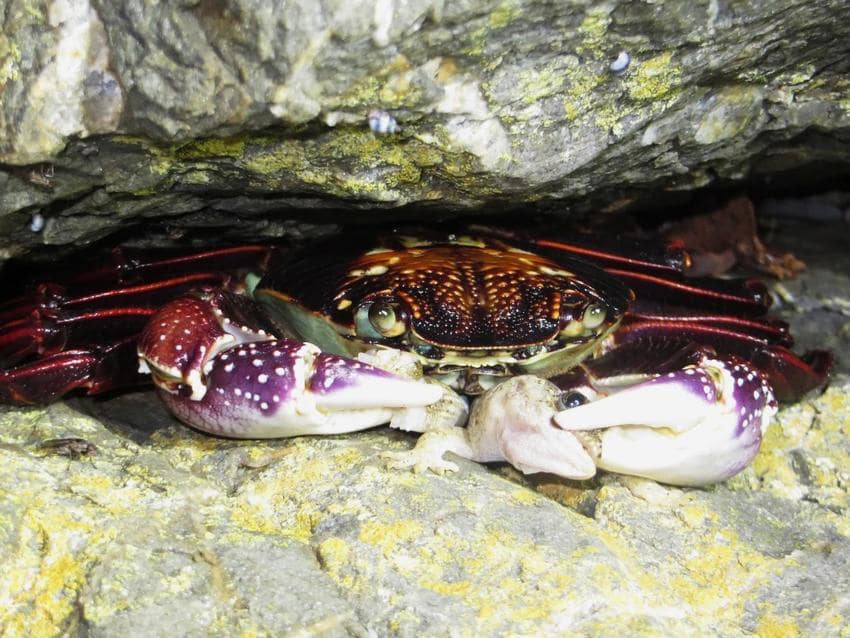
Leptograpsus variegatus preying upon a Raukawa gecko
