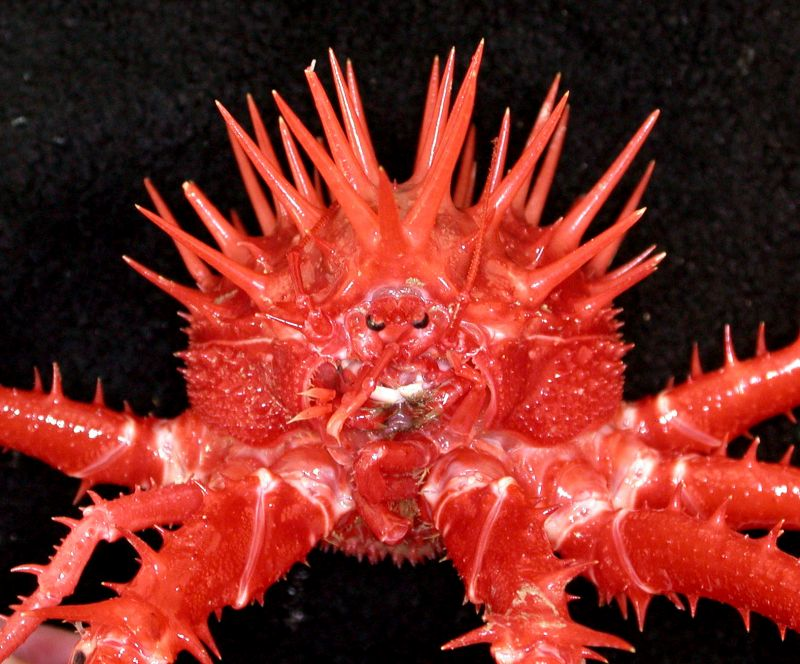

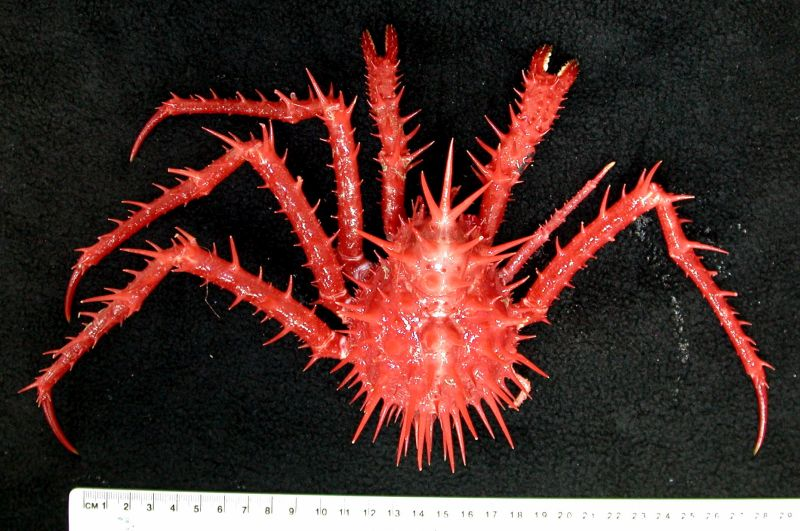

Conservation status
- Naturally Uncommon (NZ TCS)

Scientific classification
- Kingdom: Animalia
- Phylum: Arthropoda
- Clade: Pancrustacea
- Class: Malacostraca
- Order: Decapoda
- Suborder: Pleocyemata
- Infraorder: Anomura
- Family: Lithodidae
- Genus: Neolithodes
- Species: N. bronwynae

Binomial name
- Neolithodes bronwynae Ahyong, 2010

= Neolithodes bronwynae =

Species of king crab

Neolithodes bronwynae, commonly known as the rock crab, is a species of king crab that is found in the West Pacific.

== Description ==
Neolithodes bronwynae is deep-red in colour and has a pyriform carapace having been measured as large as 220.0 mm (8.66 in) in length and 155.9 mm (6.14 in) in width. The dorsal surfaces of its carapace, chelipeds, and walking legs are covered in long, slender spines with granules in between. Long spines cover its second abdominal segment, while the rest are covered in spines or nodules.

== Distribution ==
Neolithodes bronwynae has been found in the Whakatane Seamount in the Bay of Plenty, the Lord Howe Rise near Lord Howe Island, eastern Australia, and possibly New Caledonia. In 2025, it was identified in the Hawaiian–Emperor seamount chain's Koko Guyot and Yuryaku Seamount. It has been found at depths of 1,245–2,643 metres (4,085–8,671 ft).

== Taxonomy ==
Neolithodes bronwynae was described in 2010 by carcinologist Shane T. Ahyong from a male holotype taken from the Whakatane Seamount. Its specific name, "bronwynae", is after Bronwyn Ahyong. It most closely resembles N. vinogradovi and N. duhameli.

== See also ==
- List of crabs of New Zealand
