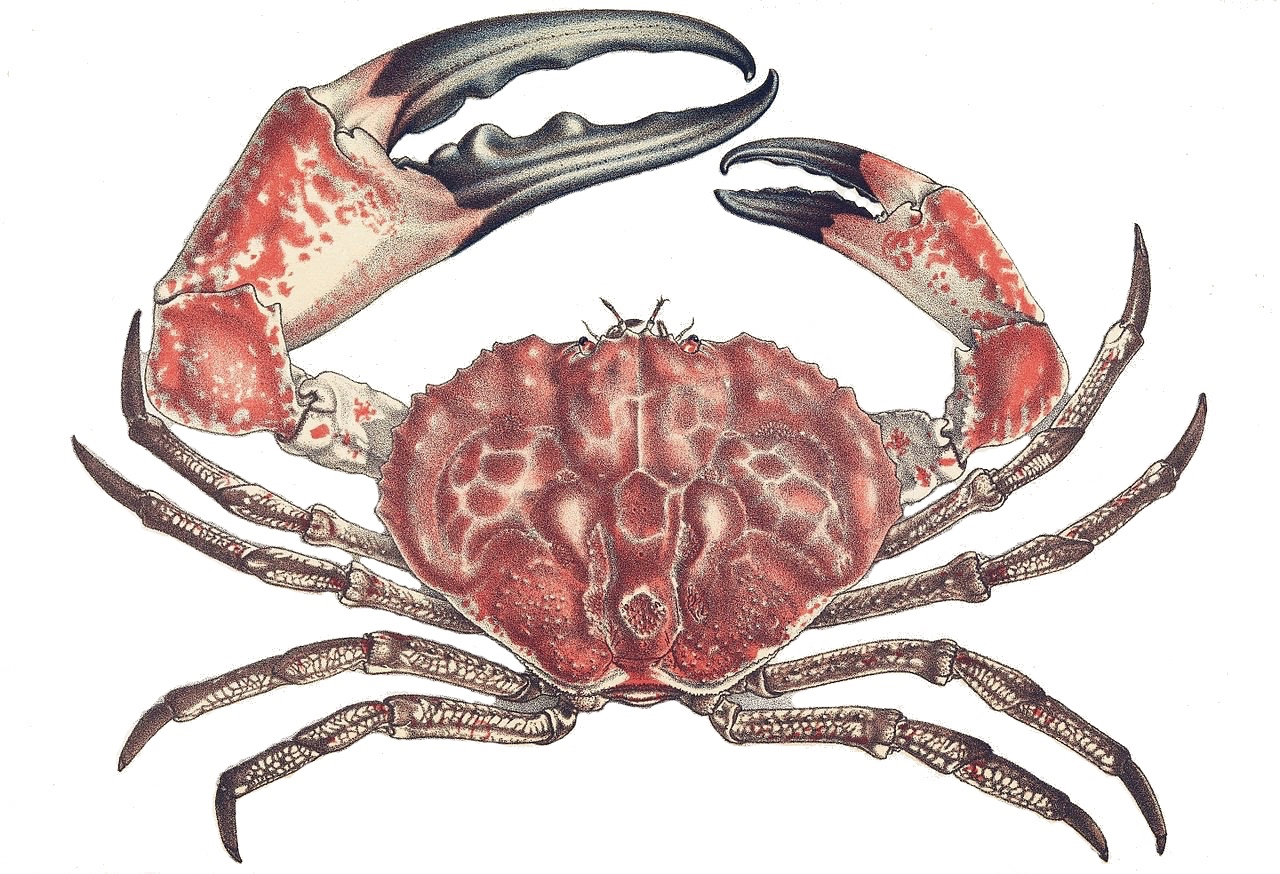
- Tasmanian giant crab (Pseudocarcinus gigas)

Scientific classification
- Kingdom: Animalia
- Phylum: Arthropoda
- Clade: Pancrustacea
- Class: Malacostraca
- Order: Decapoda
- Suborder: Pleocyemata
- Infraorder: Brachyura
- Section: Eubrachyura
- Subsection: Heterotremata
- Superfamily: Pseudocarcinoidea; Ng & Davie, 2020
- Family: Pseudocarcinidae; Ng & Davie, 2020
- Genus: Pseudocarcinus; H. Milne-Edwards, 1834

Species
- Pseudocarcinus gigas (Tasmanian giant crab); †Pseudocarcinus karlraubenheimeri

= Pseudocarcinus =

Pseudocarcinus Temporal range: Miocene - Recent

Genus of crabs

Pseudocarcinus is a genus of crab that contains two species, an extant species Tasmanian giant crab (Pseudocarcinus gigas) and the fossil species Pseudocarcinus karlraubenheimeri from the Miocene of New Zealand.
