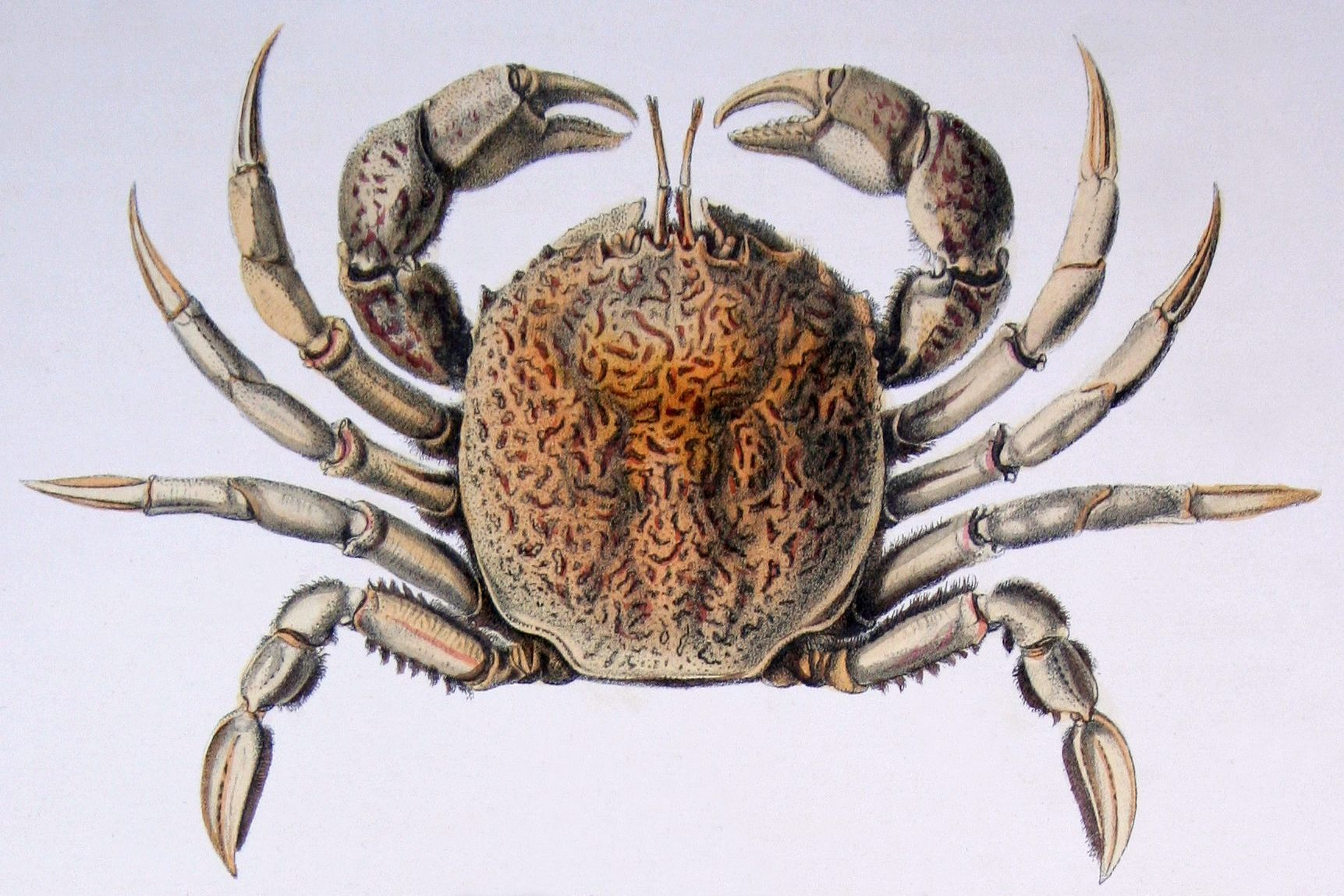
- Bellia picta

Scientific classification
- Kingdom: Animalia
- Phylum: Arthropoda
- Clade: Pancrustacea
- Class: Malacostraca
- Order: Decapoda
- Suborder: Pleocyemata
- Infraorder: Brachyura
- Subsection: Heterotremata
- Superfamily: Bellioidea; Dana, 1852
- Family: Belliidae; Dana, 1852

Genera
- Acanthocyclus; Bellia; Corystoides; Heterozius

= Belliidae =

Family of crabs

Belliidae is a family of crabs of the order Decapoda.

They respond to predators by hyper-extending all of their limbs and remain in this position a long time (Hazlett).

== Species ==
Seven species belong to the family Belliidae :

- Acanthocyclus albatrossis Rathbun, 1898
- Acanthocyclus gayi Lucas, 1844
- Acanthocyclus hassleri Rathbun, 1898
- Bellia picta H. Milne-Edwards, 1848
- Corystoides abbreviatus A. Milne-Edwards, 1880
- Corystoides chilensis Lucas, 1844
- Heterozius rotundifrons A. Milne-Edwards, 1867
