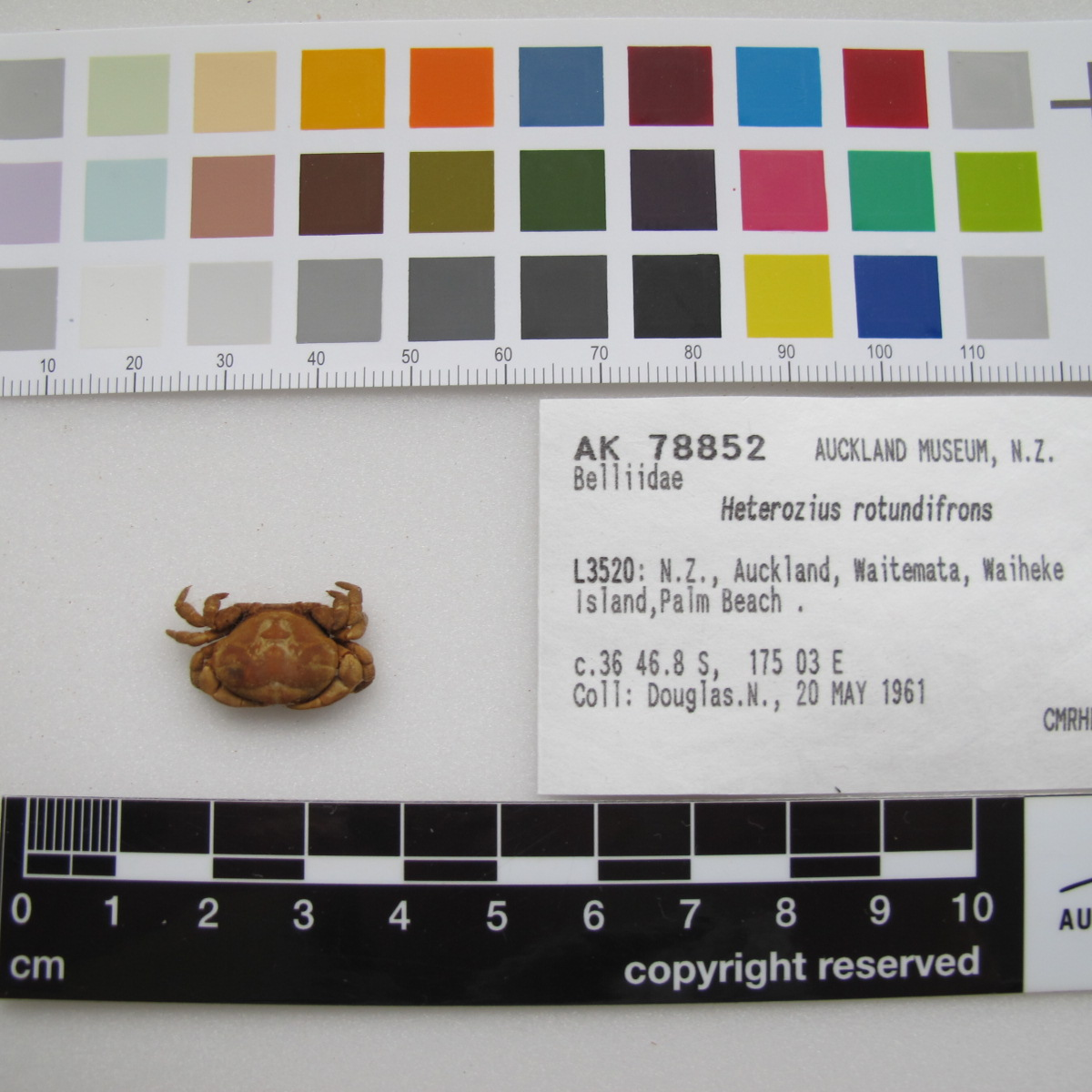
- Preserved specimen of Heterozius rotundifrons

Scientific classification
- Kingdom: Animalia
- Phylum: Arthropoda
- Clade: Pancrustacea
- Class: Malacostraca
- Order: Decapoda
- Suborder: Pleocyemata
- Infraorder: Brachyura
- Family: Belliidae
- Subfamily: Heteroziinae; Števčić, 2005
- Genus: Heterozius; A. Milne-Edwards, 1867
- Species: H. rotundifrons

Binomial name
- Heterozius rotundifrons A. Milne-Edwards, 1867

= Heterozius =

Species of crustacean

Heterozius rotundifrons, or big hand crab, is a species of crab of the family Belliidae, endemic to New Zealand. The carapace width is up to 25 millimetres (1 in).

== Behavior ==
When threatened, Heterozius rotundifrons has a unique antipredator behavior where it fully extends all its limbs including its chelipeds and becomes immobile. The crab keeps defensive stance for up to a few minutes.
