= Neolithodes nipponensis =

Scientific classification
- Kingdom: Animalia
- Phylum: Arthropoda
- Class: Malacostraca
- Order: Decapoda
- Suborder: Pleocyemata
- Infraorder: Anomura
- Family: Lithodidae
- Genus: Neolithodes
- Species: N. nipponensis

Binomial name
- Neolithodes nipponensis Sakai, 1971

Species of king crab

Neolithodes nipponensis (Japanese: ニホンイバラガニ, 'Japanese spiny crab') is a species of king crab that is found in Japan and Taiwan. It has been found at depths from 200–1,752 metres (656–5,748 ft).

== Description ==
Neolithodes nipponensis has a rounded pentagonal carapace whose margins are covered in several dozen sharp spines. It has been measured with a carapace length as large as 191 mm (7.5 in). With a legspan of approximately 108 cm (43 in), its walking legs are densely covered with sharp prickles. Its chelipeds are similarly covered in prickles, but these are mixed in with longer spines angled substantially away the from perpendicular. It has a very short rostrum of approximately 1/20 the length of its carapace. Its underside has seven abdominal segments which are well-defined and covered with prickles.

== Distribution ==
In 2001, an article was published in Zoosystema which reported N. nipponensis in Fiji. Likewise, in 2003, an article was published in Scientia Marina which reported it in the Solomon Islands. However, both of these appear to be a yet-undescribed species.

== Taxonomy ==
"Neolithodes" is derived from Greek and Latin and means "new stone-crab", while "nipponensis" – "Nippon" with the Latin suffix "-ensis" – means "of or from Japan".

== See also ==
- Neolithodes flindersi, a species which closely resembles N. nipponensis
