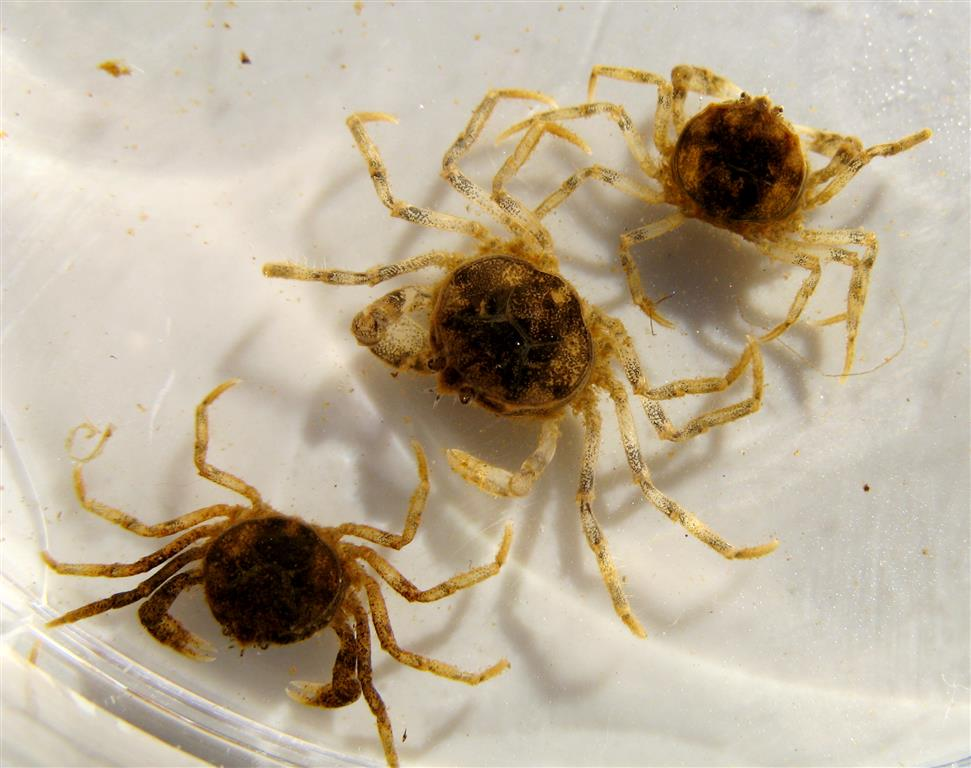

Scientific classification
- Kingdom: Animalia
- Phylum: Arthropoda
- Clade: Pancrustacea
- Class: Malacostraca
- Order: Decapoda
- Suborder: Pleocyemata
- Infraorder: Brachyura
- Family: Hymenosomatidae
- Genus: Amarinus
- Species: A. lacustris

Binomial name
- Amarinus lacustris (Chilton, 1882)

Synonyms
- Elamena lacustris Chilton, 1882; Hymenosoma lacustris (Chilton, 1882); Halicarcinus lacustris (Chilton, 1882)

= Amarinus lacustris =

Species of crab

Amarinus lacustris is a species of freshwater crab from Australia, New Zealand and nearby islands, where it lives in water of various salinities. It grows up to 10 mm (0.4 in) wide, with an H-shaped groove on its back. It is an omnivore and is eaten by crayfish and fish. It was first discovered in Lake Pupuke, near Auckland, and is the only freshwater crab in New Zealand.

== Distribution ==
Amarinus lacustris is widespread in south-eastern Australia, from Tasmania to the Murray-Darling basin in South Australia and Victoria. It reaches as far inland as Lake Colac, Victoria.

In New Zealand, A. lacustris is the only freshwater crab, and is found in a variety of habitats, including lakes, slow-flowing streams and larger rivers. It is found from the lower reaches of the Waikato River to Northland, with a notable population in the Oratia Stream near Auckland.

The species is also found on small islands in the Tasman Sea, such as Lord Howe Island and Norfolk Island, where it was first found at an altitude of "about 3,000 ft" (900 m) on Mount Gower.

== Description ==
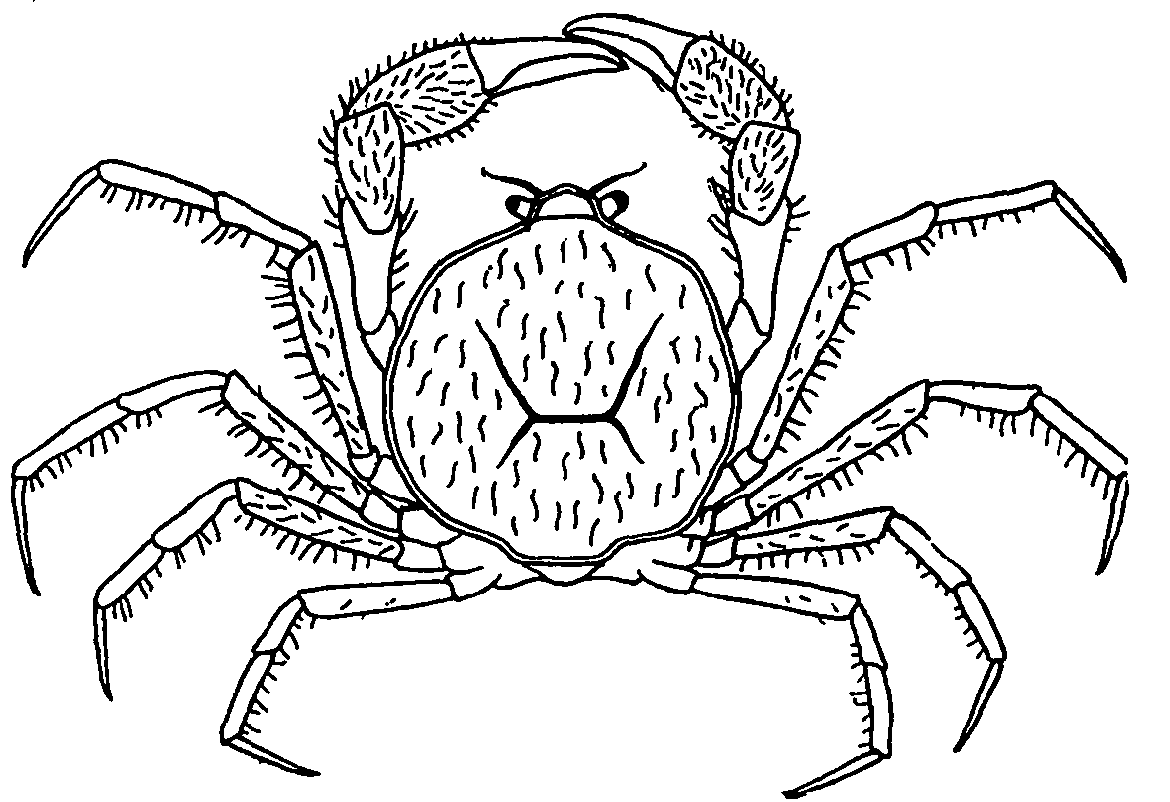
Amarinus lacustris (as Hymenosoma lacustris) in Chilton's 1914 description of a specimen from Norfolk Island

Amarinus lacustris grows to a maximum size of 10 millimetres (0.39 in) across the carapace, with a leg span of 20 mm. The carapace is grey-brown and almost circular, marked with a set of grooves forming an H-shape with the two uprights bending outwards, and the whole animal is covered in setae.

The closely related species A. paralacustris was separated from A. lacustris in 1970, but only mature females can be identified to the species level. The main difference between the two is that A. lacustris has "direct development", in which there are no free-living larval stages, whereas A. paralacustris has indirect development, including free-swimming larvae. Hatchlings are carried under the female's tail until they are large enough to feed independently.

== Ecology ==
Amarinus lacustris lives in estuarine, freshwater and shallow subtidal habitats, usually in salinities of 1–6‰, but occasionally to 0.1–9.6‰. It can be found living amongst detritus and vegetation in the shaded edges of rivers and lakes. Remains of both animals and plants have been found in the gut contents of A. lacustris, indicating an omnivorous diet. Its predators include crayfish and introduced trout.

== Taxonomic history ==
Amarinus lacustris was first described (as Elamena lacustris) by Charles Chilton in 1882, based on a single juvenile female collected from Lake Pupuke on New Zealand's North Island. The species was later transferred to the genera Hymenosoma and Halicarcinus, and then to a new genus, Amarinus, in 1980. The name amarinus is derived from the Latin meaning "not the sea", while the specific epithet lacustris means "of lakes".
