= Zoosystema =

- Discipline: Animal Science and Zoology
- Language: English and French
- Edited by: Laure Desutter-Grandcolas

Publication details
- History: 1997-present
- Publisher: Muséum national d'histoire naturelle (France)
- Frequency: Quarterly
- Open access: yes
- Impact factor: 1.0 (2022)

Standard abbreviations
- ISO 4: Zoosystema

Indexing
- ISSN: 1280-9551
- OCLC no.: 930608541

Links
- Journal homepage; Online archive

Zoosystema is a peer-reviewed scientific journal published by the National Museum of Natural History, France (Muséum national d'histoire naturelle), covering research in animal biodiversity. Specific subjects within the journal's scope include comparative, functional and evolutionary morphology, phylogeny, biogeography, taxonomy and nomenclature, among others. Zoosystema publishes articles in English and French.

== Indexing ==
The journal is abstracted and indexed by Current Contents, Biological Abstracts, ASFA (Aquatic Sciences and Fisheries Abstracts), Pascal, Zoological Record, Journal Citation Index Expanded (SciSearch®) and Scopus.
