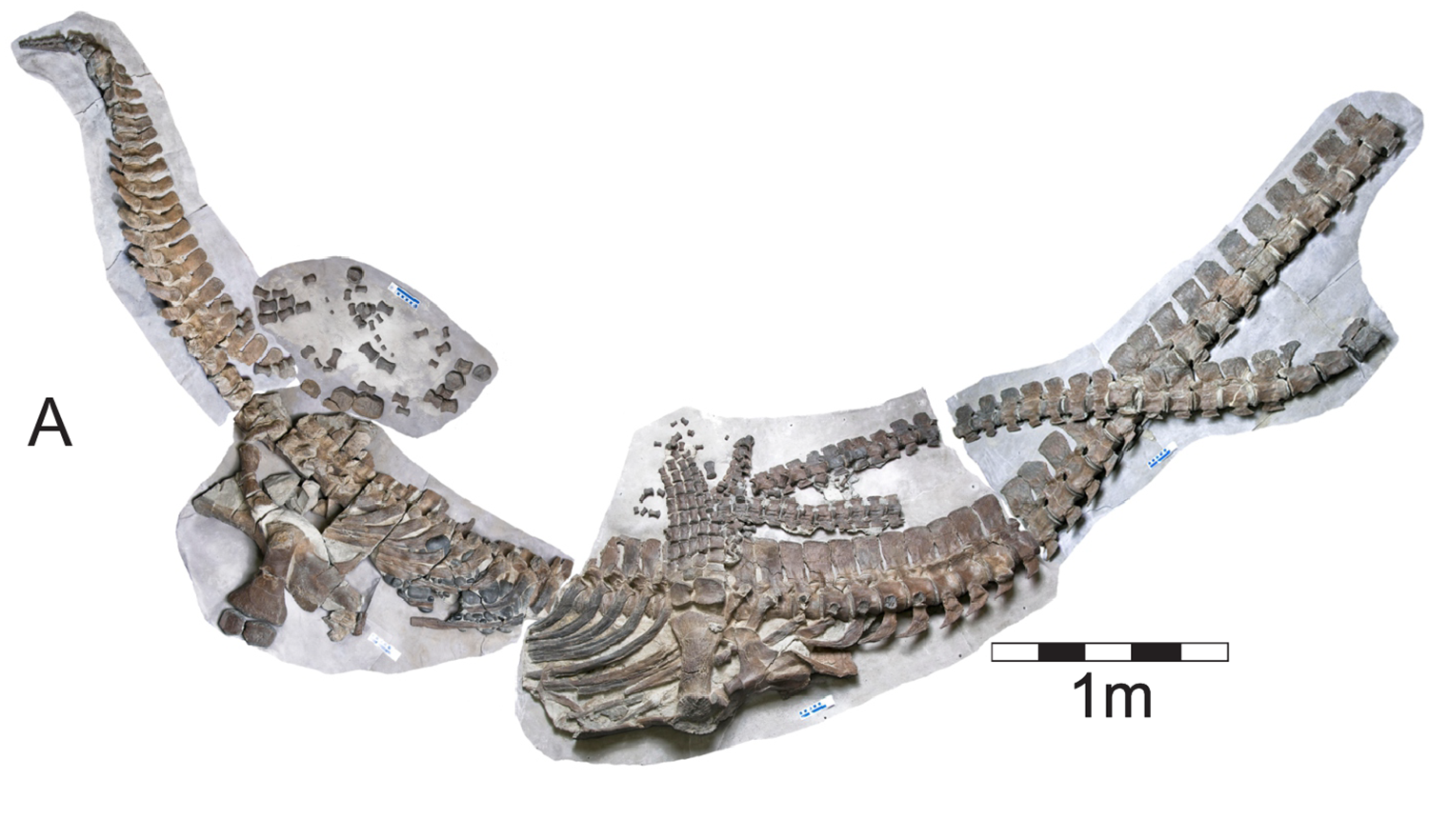
- Holotype skeleton (TMP 2007.011.0001)

Scientific classification
- Kingdom: Animalia
- Phylum: Chordata
- Class: Reptilia
- Superorder: †Sauropterygia
- Order: †Plesiosauria
- Superfamily: †Plesiosauroidea
- Family: †Elasmosauridae
- Subfamily: †Elasmosaurinae
- Genus: †Albertonectes; Kubo et al., 2012

Type species
- †Albertonectes vanderveldei Kubo et al., 2012

= Albertonectes =

Albertonectes Temporal range: Late Cretaceous (Campanian), 73.5 Ma

Extinct genus of reptiles

Albertonectes (meaning 'Alberta swimmer') is an extinct genus of large plesiosaurs that lived in North America during the Campanian stage of the Late Cretaceous period, at around 73.5 million years ago. The only known species is A. vanderveldei, described in 2012 from an almost complete postcranial skeleton discovered in 2007 near Lethbridge, in the province of Alberta, Canada. Although currently only documented from the holotype, a possible second specimen was discovered in 2015 in the same locality.

With a maximum length estimated at 12.1 metres (40 ft), Albertonectes is the longest known elasmosaurid. Like the other representatives of this group, it has a streamlined body with paddle-like limbs, a short tail, a small head, and an extremely long neck. The neck alone is estimated at around 7 meters (23 ft) long, making Albertonectes one of the animals with the longest known necks. It is also the vertebrate with the greatest number of cervical vertebrae identified to date, 76, ahead of its close relative Elasmosaurus.

== Discovery and naming ==
The first known specimen of Albertonectes was discovered in 2007 near the St. Mary River, near the town of Lethbridge, in southern Alberta, Canada. It was discovered unexpectedly by an excavator during ammolite mining carried out by the company Korite International Ltd. At the initial moment of the discovery, the excavator accidentally broke part of the fossils coming from the middle of the animal's trunk, including an unknown quantity of gastroliths (stomach stones). A large part of these fossils have since been noted as lost, and due to the unique character of the specimen as well as its excellent preservation, it was subsequently decided to leave it as is and not to remove any elements found there. This specimen, since housed at the Royal Tyrrell Museum of Palaeontology and numbered as TMP 2007.011.0001, consists of an almost complete and articulated skeleton of a large plesiosaur, but the skull is missing. More precisely, it includes 132 vertebrae from the atlas-axis complex to fused tip of the tail vertebrae, a complete pectoral but an incomplete pelvic girdle, almost complete forelimbs and hindlimbs, disarticulated ribs, an abdominal rib, and at least 97 associated gastroliths. The skeleton also preserves two teeth coming from the lamniform shark Squalicorax, the few traces of grooves present on the left coracoid indicating that the specimen would have been scavenged after its death. Stratigraphically, the skeleton was exhumed in an area dating from the middle of the late Campanian of the Bearpaw Formation, a period located around 73.5 million years ago. In 2012, Japanese paleontologist Tai Kubo and his Canadian colleagues Mark T. Mitchell and Donald M. Henderson described the specimen as the holotype of a new genus and species of elasmosaurid named Albertonectes vanderveldei. The genus name Albertonectes comes from Alberta, in reference to the province where the animal was discovered, and from the Ancient Greek word νηκτός (nêktós, "swimmer"). The specific name is named in honor of Rene Vandervelde, the founder of the Korite International, the gem-mining company that discovered the holotype. Albertonectes represents the first significantly complete plesiosaur to be discovered in the Bearpaw Formation, as well as the second elasmosaurid to be identified in the same formation after Terminonatator in 2003.

On November 9, 2015, it was reported to the Royal Tyrrell Museum that some articulated vertebrae were discovered in conditions similar to those previously mentioned, still near Lethbridge. Subsequently, more vertebrae were discovered by Korite workers, but due to the particularly difficult conditions in winter, the recovery of the fossils had to be done quickly. The fossils recovered consist of a partial skeleton preserving a vertebral column running from the base of the neck to the base of the tail, followed by a few articulated and disarticulated ribs. The discovery was made official the following year by Canadian paleontologist Darren H. Tanke via a summary, in which he referred this specimen as cf. Albertonectes.

== Description ==
Size compared to a human

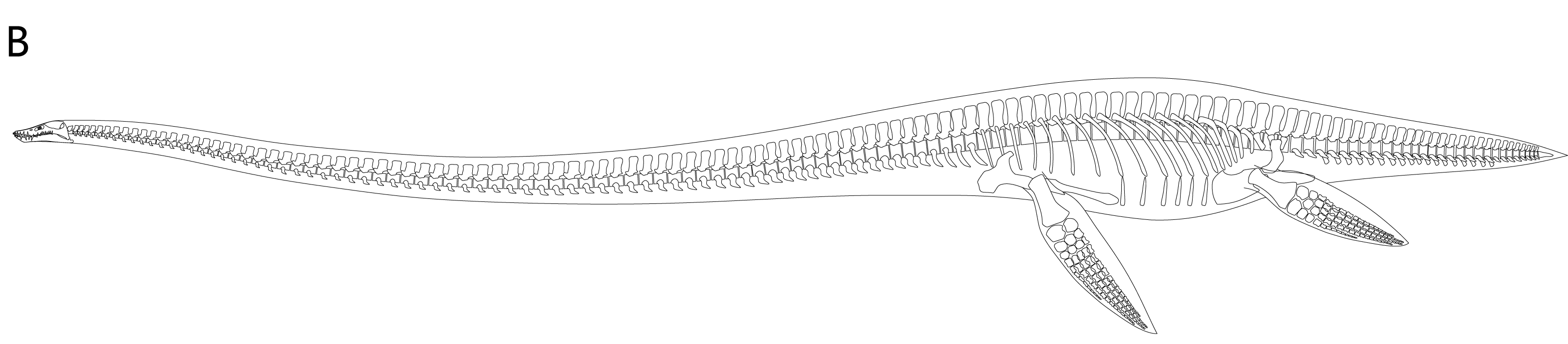
Skeletal diagram

Albertonectes has the longest neck of any elasmosaur ever discovered, which reached up to 7 metres (23 ft). The holotype, missing the skull, measures at 11.2 metres (37 ft) from the atlas-axis complex to the tip of the tail, suggesting a total body length of 11.6 metres (38 ft) with the skull. In 2024, Henderson estimated its total body length up to 12.1 metres (40 ft) and its total body mass around 4.8 metric tons (5.3 short tons). In 2026, Zhao estimated a lower body mass estimate of 3.1 metric tons (3.4 short tons) for an individual of same body length.

Albertonectes is also unique among other elasmosaurids in having 76 neck vertebrae, a record number among elasmosaurids (and vertebrates as a whole). Callawayasaurus with a similar count of 56 lacks the dumbbell-shaped articular faces that are present on the vertebrae of Vegasaurus. Additional traits rarely seen in other elasmosaurids include: a tapered front-side projection on the pubis that extends to the side beyond the acetabulum, a longitudinal ridge on the side of most neck vertebrae up to cervical 69, a clavicular arch that is wider than the adjacent front edge of the scapula, the lack of pectoral and pelvic bar, a tip of the tail that is made of seven fused tail vertebrae, and a slender humerus with a width-to-length ratio of 0.56, among other traits.

Albertonectes is known from a mature individual, as suggested by the fused neural spines and most cervical ribs to their centra, and by the only partial connection between the trochanter and the capitulum (head) of the femur, seen in TMP 2007.011.0001. Other observation also support an adult age, e.g. rough and wrinkled vertebral surfaces as well as well-developed facets and articulations on its wrist and ankle bones.

=== Gastroliths ===
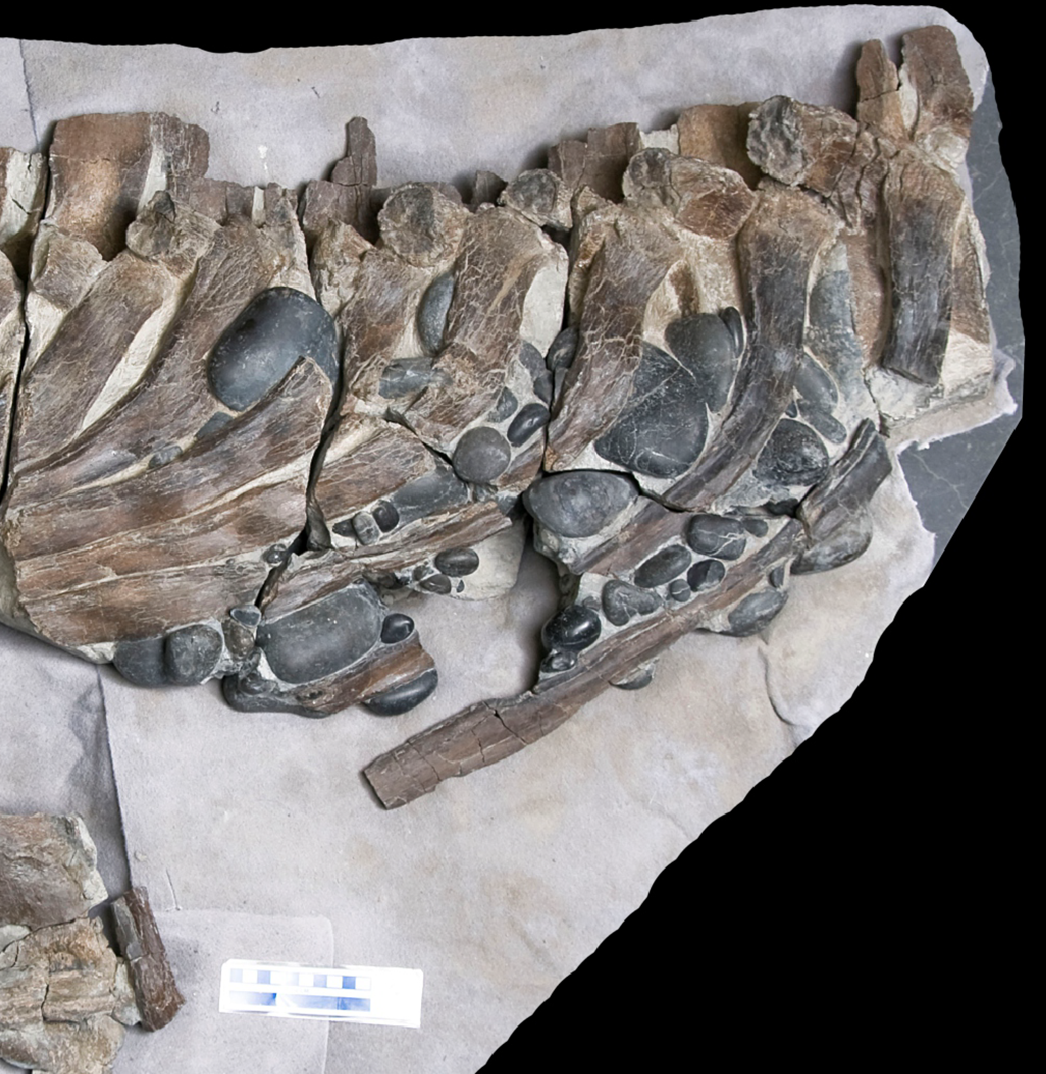
Gastroliths. This area of the body had been smashed by an excavator bucket, resulting in the loss of parts of the ribs and some gastroliths.

The single known specimen of Albertonectes preserves gastroliths, 97 of which are exposed and visible. These poked out of the dorsal side of the body between the ribs, as the animal had come to lie down on the seabed on its back some time after death, the gastroliths moving into the present position through gravity as the body decayed. The largest of the visible gastroliths weighed an estimated 1.13 kg. Gastroliths were generally either disc-shaped or spherical; the former would've come from beaches and the latter from river mouths. All were composed of chert, as is the case with several other species of plesiosaurs. It is hypothesized that chert stones were specifically sought out by plesiosaurs as gastroliths for their hardness and durability.

== Classification ==
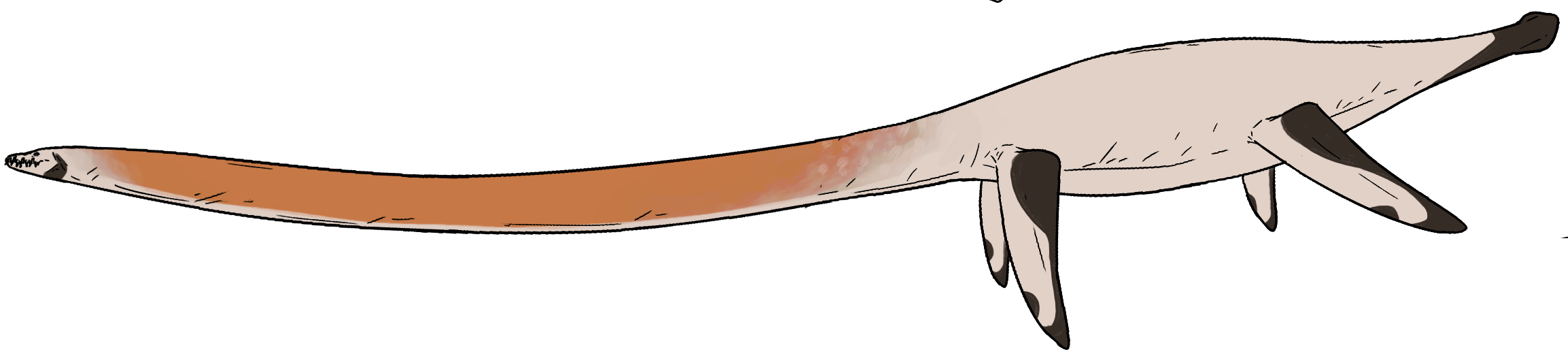
Life restoration

In their original 2012 description, Kubo and colleagues argued that assigning Albertonectes to the Elasmosauridae would be problematic in the absence of cranial material, as the skull provides key diagnostic features for newly described species. Nevertheless, many other elasmosaurids, including the type genus Elasmosaurus, are known primarily from postcranial remains, and numerous previous cladistic analyses have shown that more than one-third of the characters used are postcranial. To determine the phylogenetic affinities of Albertonectes, the authors coded it into a data matrix originally created by Tamaki Sato in 2002. They recovered it in a relatively basal position within the Elasmosauridae, although the exclusion of cranial characters increased the number of unresolved polytomies. In the official description of the related genus Vegasaurus, published in 2015, Argentine paleontologist José P. O’Gorman and colleagues adopted the modified topology proposed by Kubo et al. (2012). In this analysis, Albertonectes occupied a more derived position, within a clade that also included Futabasaurus and Mauisaurus—the latter since recognized as a nomen dubium in a paper published two years later.

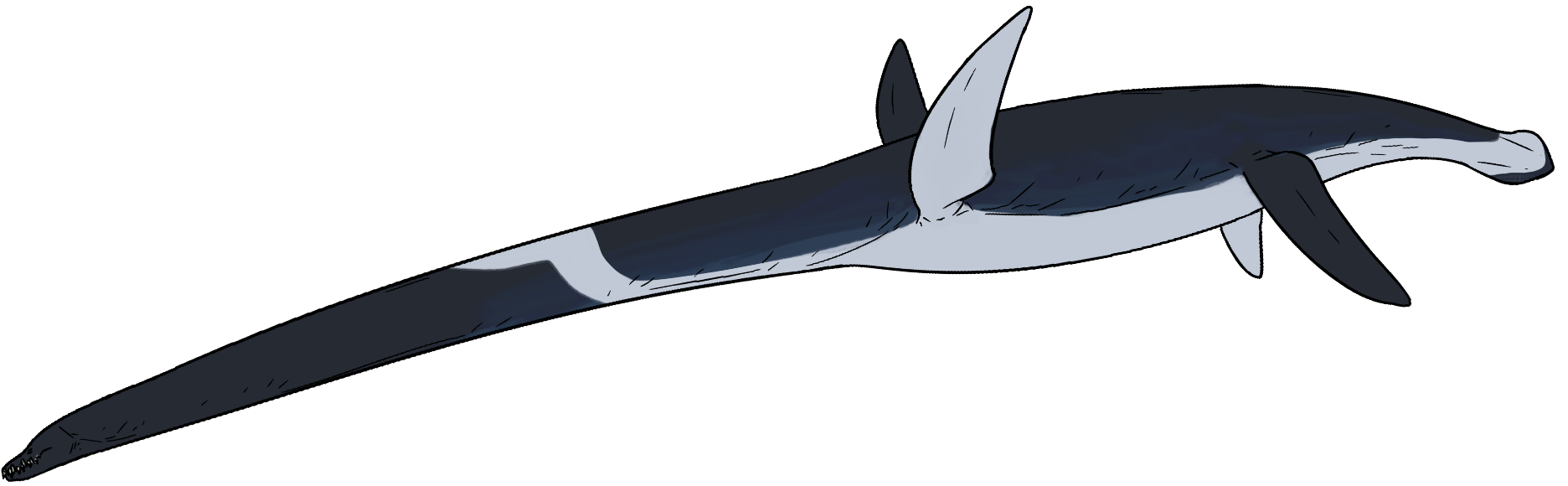
Life restoration of Elasmosaurus, viewed as the sister taxon of Albertonectes according to the most recent phylogenetic analyses.

In 2016, Chilean paleontologist Rodrigo A. Otero established the subfamily Styxosaurinae to include four genera: Terminonatator, Styxosaurus, Albertonectes, and Elasmosaurus. Members of this group are primarily characterized by having more than 60 cervical vertebrae. Within the subfamily, Albertonectes and Elasmosaurus form a derived branch that includes the only known representatives with more than 70 cervical vertebrae. In another analysis published the following year, American paleontologist Danielle J. Serratos and her colleagues did not resolve the position of Elasmosaurus, but noted that the Styxosaurinae could be synonymous with the Elasmosaurinae if the type genus indeed belongs to the group. In 2020, O’Gorman formally synonymized the Styxosaurinae with the Elasmosaurinae based on the inclusion of Elasmosaurus within the clade, and also provided a list of diagnostic features defining it. The following cladogram follows Otero (2016), with clade names following O’Gorman (2020):

- Cryptoclidia
  - Cryptoclididae
  - Xenopsaria
    - Leptocleidia
      - Leptocleididae
      - Polycotylidae
    - Elasmosauridae
      - Eromangasaurus
      - - Callawayasaurus
        - - Libonectes
          - - - Tuarangisaurus
              - Thalassomedon
            - - Specimen CM Zfr 115
              - - Hydrotherosaurus
                - Futabasaurus
            - - Aristonectinae
                - Kaiwhekea
                - - Alexandronectes
                  - - Morturneria
                    - Aristonectes
              - Elasmosaurinae
                - Terminonatator
                - - - Elasmosaurus
                    - Albertonectes
                  - Styxosaurus

== See also ==
- Timeline of plesiosaur research
- List of plesiosaur genera
