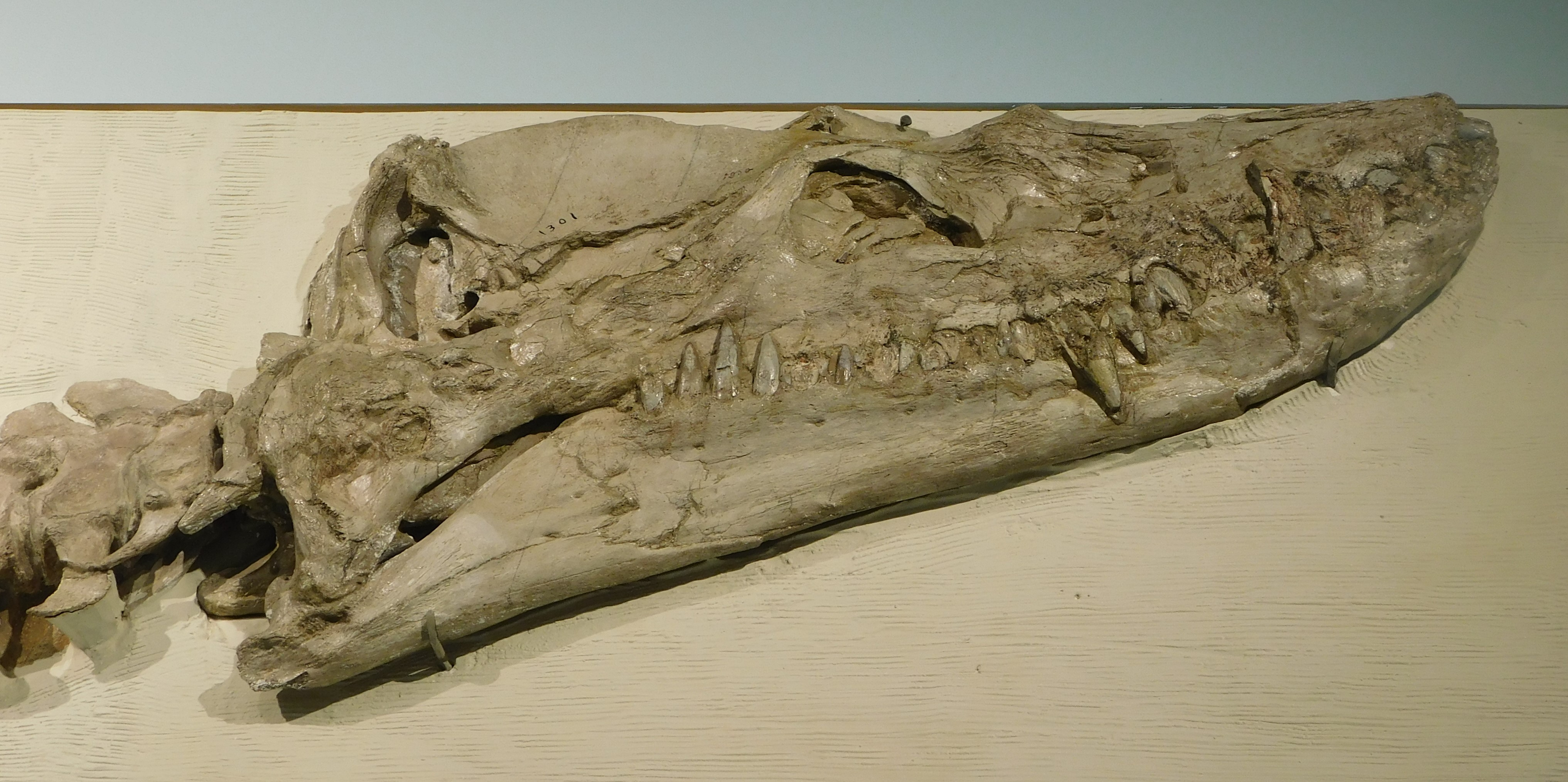
- Holotype skull of Styxosaurus snowii

Scientific classification
- Kingdom: Animalia
- Phylum: Chordata
- Class: Reptilia
- Superorder: †Sauropterygia
- Order: †Plesiosauria
- Superfamily: †Plesiosauroidea
- Family: †Elasmosauridae
- Subfamily: †Elasmosaurinae
- Genus: †Styxosaurus; Welles, 1943

Species
- †S. snowii (Williston, 1890; type); †S. browni Welles, 1952; †S. rezaci Smith & O'Keefe, 2023

Synonyms
- Cimoliasaurus snowii Williston, 1890; Elasmosaurus snowii (Williston, 1890); Ogmodirus ischiadicus Williston & Moodie, 1903/1913; Thalassonomosaurus marshi (Williston, 1906) Welles, 1943 [originally Elasmosaurus]; Alzadasaurus pembertonii Welles & Bump, 1949; Alzadasaurus kansasensis Welles, 1952

= Styxosaurus =

Styxosaurus Temporal range: Late Cretaceous, 100.5-72.1 Ma, Cenomanian–Campanian

Extinct genus of reptiles

Styxosaurus is a genus of elasmosaurid plesiosaur that lived during the Late Cretaceous period. Three species are known: S. snowii, S. browni, and S. rezaci. Fossils are known from North America and are mainly found in the Niobrara and Pierre Shale formations. Older fossils are known from the Graneros Shale.

== Discovery ==
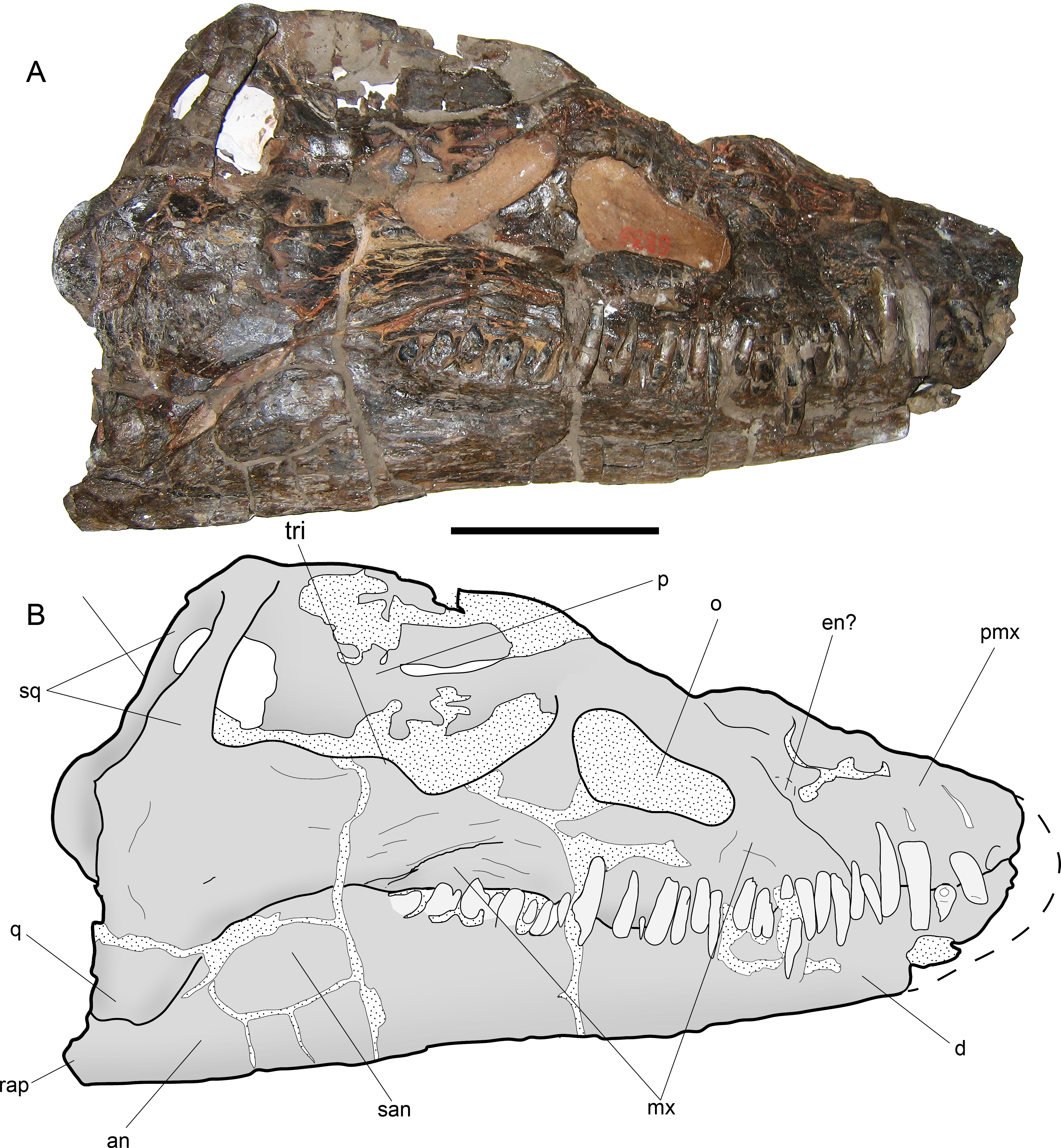
Skull of S. browni

The holotype specimen of Styxosaurus snowii a complete skull and 20 vertebrae and was first described by S.W. Williston Styxosaurus is named for the mythological River Styx (Στυξ), which separated the Greek underworld from the world of the living. The -saurus part comes from the Greek sauros (σαυρος), meaning "lizard" or "reptile." The type specimen was found on Hell Creek in Logan County, Kansas, which is the source of the genus name coined by Samuel Paul Welles, who described the genus in 1943.

Another more complete specimen, SDSMT 451, was discovered near Iona, South Dakota, also in the US, in 1945. The specimen was originally described and named Alzadasaurus pembertoni by Welles and Bump (1949) and remained so until it was synonymized with S. snowii by Carpenter. Its chest cavity contained about 250 gastroliths, or "stomach stones". Although it is mounted at the School of Mines as if its head were looking up and out of the water, such a position would be physically impossible. In 2023, Elliott Smith and Robin O'Keefe also assigned this specimen to Styxosaurus but considered it to be indeterminate at the species level.

In 2023, another species of Styxosaurus, S. rezaci, was named by Smith and O'Keefe, based on a specimen from the Cenomanian of Nebraska previously thought to belong to Thalassomedon.

== Description ==
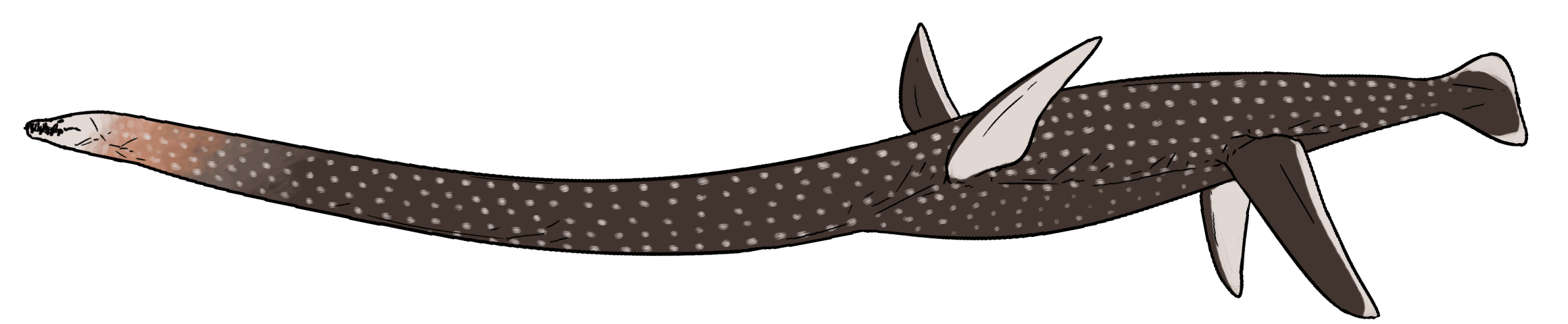
Life restoration of S. snowii

Styxosaurus was a large elasmosaur, with a long neck measuring about 5.25 metres (17.2 ft) in total. The S. snowii specimen NJSM 15435 was reported to measure 10 m (33 ft), though it lacks the skull and the frontmost neck vertebrae. The size of specimen SDSM 451 assigned to Styxosaurus sp. is estimated around 11.3 metres (37 ft) in body length and 3.1 metric tons (3.4 short tons) in body mass. The cranium of the holotype measures 42 cm (1.38 ft) long, with its mandible measuring 48 cm (1.57 ft) long. Its sharp teeth were conical and were adapted to puncture and hold rather than to cut; like other plesiosaurs, Styxosaurus swallowed its food whole.

== Classification ==
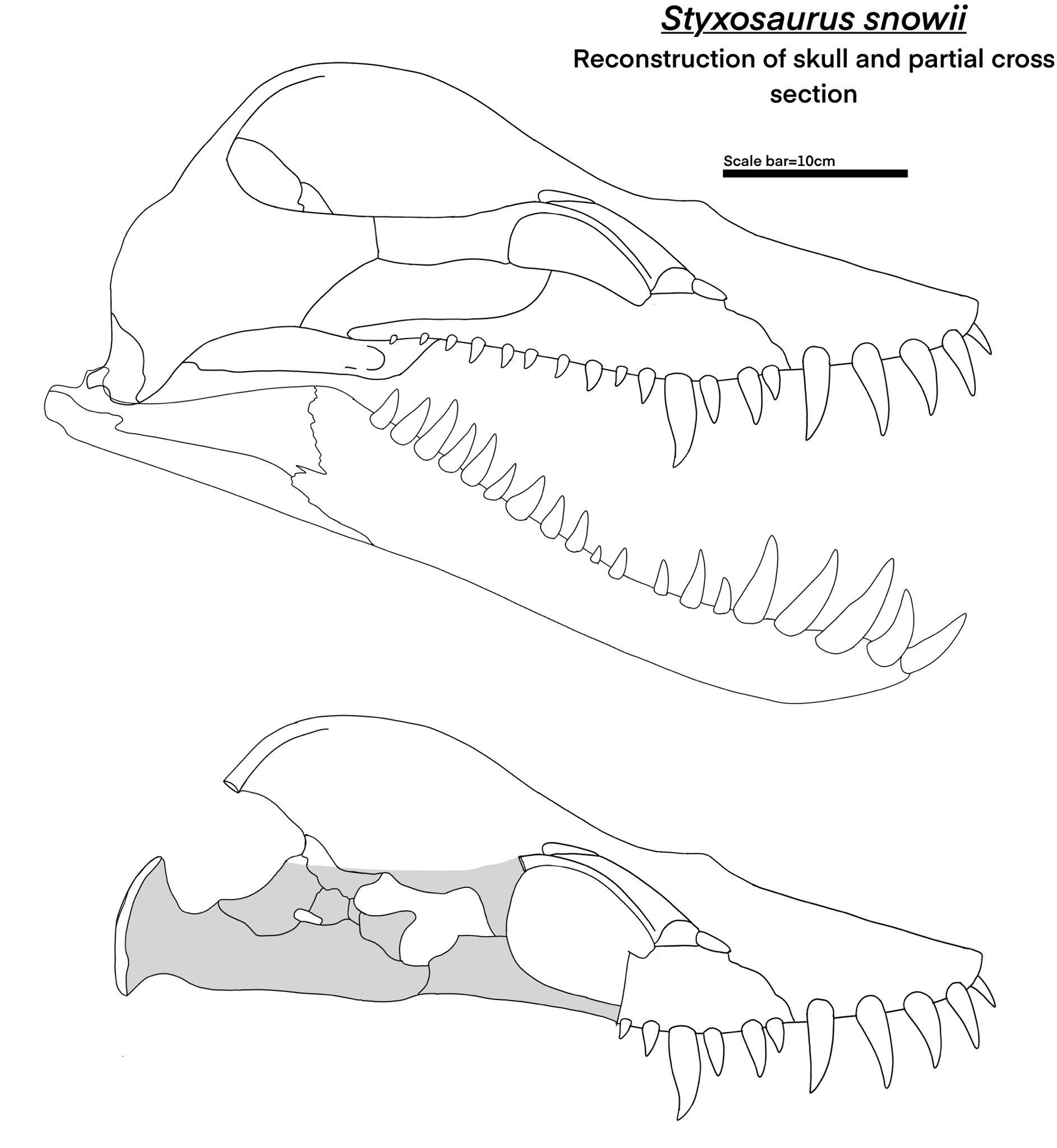
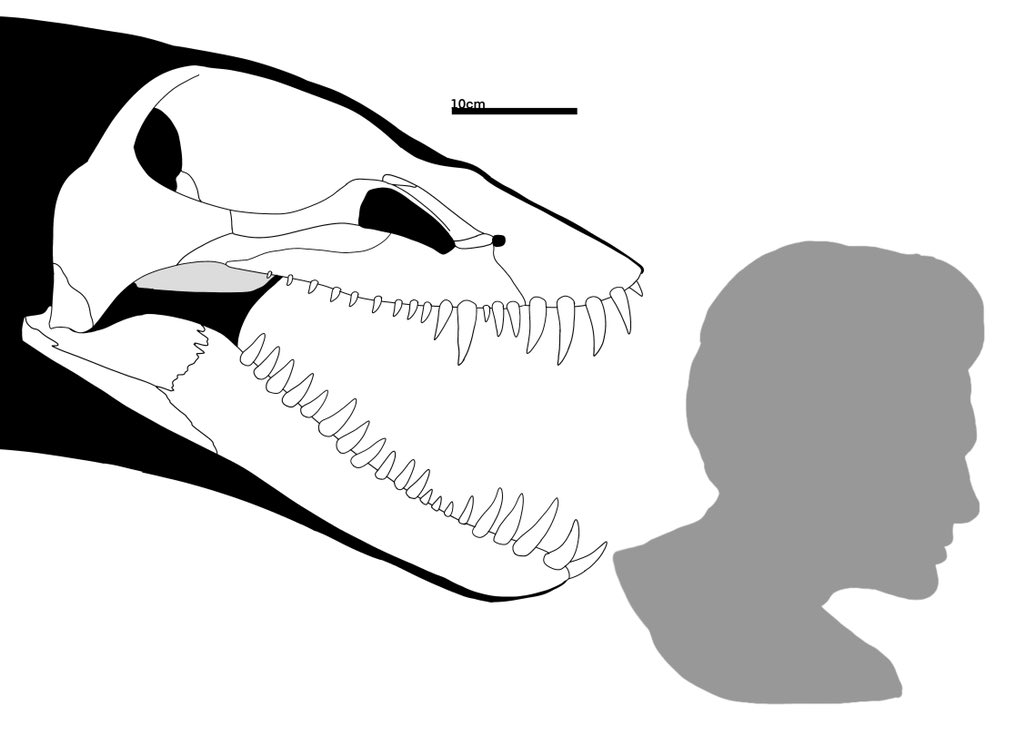
Skull diagrams of S. snowii (top) and S. browni (bottom)

Styxosaurus snowii is from a group called elasmosaurs, and is closely related to Elasmosaurus platyurus, which was found in Kansas, USA, in 1867.

The first Styxosaurus to be described was initially called Cimoliasaurus snowii by S.W. Williston in 1890. The specimen included a complete skull and more than 20 cervical vertebrae ( KUVP 1301) that were found near Hell Creek in western Kansas by Judge E.P. West.

The name was later changed to Elasmosaurus snowii by Williston in 1906 and then to Styxosaurus snowii by Welles in 1943.

A second species, Styxosaurus browni, was named by Welles in 1952. Although synonymized with Hydralmosaurus serpentinus by Kenneth Carpenter in 1999, it was revalidated by Rodrigo A. Otero in 2016.

The following cladogram shows the placement of Styxosaurus within Elasmosauridae following an analysis by Otero, 2016:

- Elasmosauridae
  - Eromangasaurus carinognathus
  - - Callawayasaurus colombiensis
    - - Libonectes morgani
      - - - Tuarangisaurus keyesi
          - Thalassomedon haningtoni
        - - CM Zfr 115
          - - Hydrotherosaurus alexandrae
            - Futabasaurus suzukii
        - - Aristonectinae
            - Kaiwhekea katiki
            - - Alexandronectes zealandiensis
              - - Morturneria seymourensis
                - - Aristonectes parvidens
                  - Aristonectes quiriquinensis
          - Elasmosaurinae
            - Terminonatator pointeixensis
            - - - Elasmosaurus platyurus
                - Albertonectes vanderveldei
              - - Styxosaurus sp. (="Hydralmosaurus serpentinus")
                - - Styxosaurus snowii
                  - Styxosaurus browni

== Palaeobiology ==
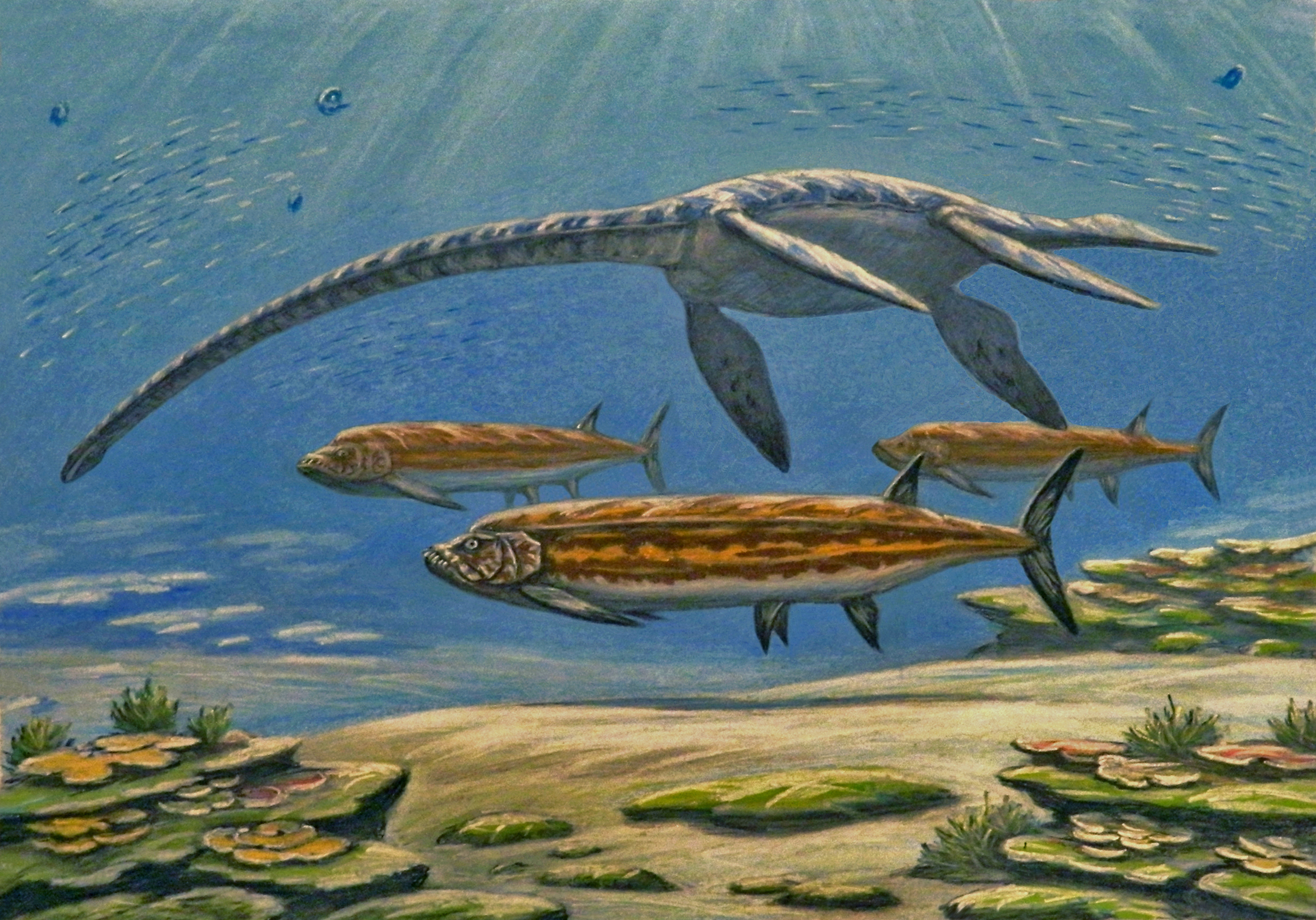
Restoration of Styxosaurus and Xiphactinus

While most predators do not use gastroliths for grinding of food, almost all reasonably complete elasmosaur specimens include gastroliths. Although it is possible Styxosaurus may have used the stones as ballast, a Styxosaurus specimen found in the Pierre Shale of western Kansas included ground up fish bones mixed with the gastroliths. In addition, the weight of the gastroliths found in elasmosaur specimens is always much less than 1% of the estimated weight of the living animal.

While crocodiles and some other animals may use gastroliths for ballast today, it appears likely that elasmosaurs used them as a gastric mill. See Henderson (2006) contra Wings (2004).

Styxosaurus, like most other plesiosaurs, probably fed on belemnites, fish (Gillicus, etc.) and squid. With its interlocking teeth, Styxosaurus could grab on to its slippery prey before swallowing it.

== See also ==
- List of plesiosaur genera
- Timeline of plesiosaur research

== Sources ==
- Everhart, M. J. 2000. Gastroliths associated with plesiosaur remains in the Sharon Springs Member of the Pierre Shale (Late Cretaceous), western Kansas. Transactions of the Kansas Academy of Science 103(1-2): 58–69.
- Cicimurri, D. J. and M. J. Everhart, 2001. An elasmosaur with stomach contents and gastroliths from the Pierre Shale (late Cretaceous) of Kansas. Kansas Acad. Sci. Trans 104(3-4):129-143.
- Everhart, M. J. 2005a. Oceans of Kansas - A Natural History of the Western Interior Sea. Indiana University Press, 320 pp.
- Everhart, M. J. 2005b. Elasmosaurid remains from the Pierre Shale (Upper Cretaceous) of western Kansas. Possible missing elements of the type specimen of Elasmosaurus platyurus Cope 1868? PalArch 4(3): 19–32.
- Everhart, M. J. 2006. The occurrence of elasmosaurids (Reptilia: Plesiosauria) in the Niobrara Chalk of Western Kansas. Paludicola 5(4):170-183.
- Henderson, J. 2006. Floating point: a computational study of buoyancy, equilibrium, and gastroliths in plesiosaurs. Lethaia 39: 227–244.
- Welles, S. P. 1943. Elasmosaurid plesiosaurs with a description of the new material from California and Colorado. University of California Memoirs 13:125-254. figs.1-37., pls.12-29.
- Welles, S. P. 1952. A review of the North American Cretaceous elasmosaurs. University of California Publications in Geological Sciences 29:46-144. figs. 1-25.
- Welles, S. P. 1962. A new species of elasmosaur from the Aptian of Columbia and a review of the Cretaceous plesiosaurs. University of California Press, Berkeley and Los Angeles.
- Welles, S. P. and Bump, J. 1949. Alzadasaurus pembertoni, a new elasmosaur from the Upper Cretaceous of South Dakota. Journal of Paleontology 23(5): 521–535.
- Williston S. W. (1890a). "Structure of the Plesiosaurian Skull". Science. 16 (405): 262. doi:10.1126/science.ns-16.405.262. JSTOR 1766513. PMID 17829759.
- Williston S. W. (1890b). "A New Plesiosaur from the Niobrara Cretaceous of Kansas". Transactions of the Annual Meetings of the Kansas Academy of Science. 12: 174–178. doi:10.2307/3623798. JSTOR 3623798.
- Williston S. W. (1891). "An Interesting Food Habit of the Plesiosaurs". Transactions of the Annual Meetings of the Kansas Academy of Science. 13: 121–122. doi:10.2307/3623988. JSTOR 3623988.
- Williston S. W. (1906). "North American plesiosaurs: Elasmosaurus, Cimoliasaurus, and Polycotylus". American Journal of Science. Series 4. 21 (123): 221–236. Bibcode:1906AmJS...21..221W. doi:10.2475/ajs.s4-21.123.221.
