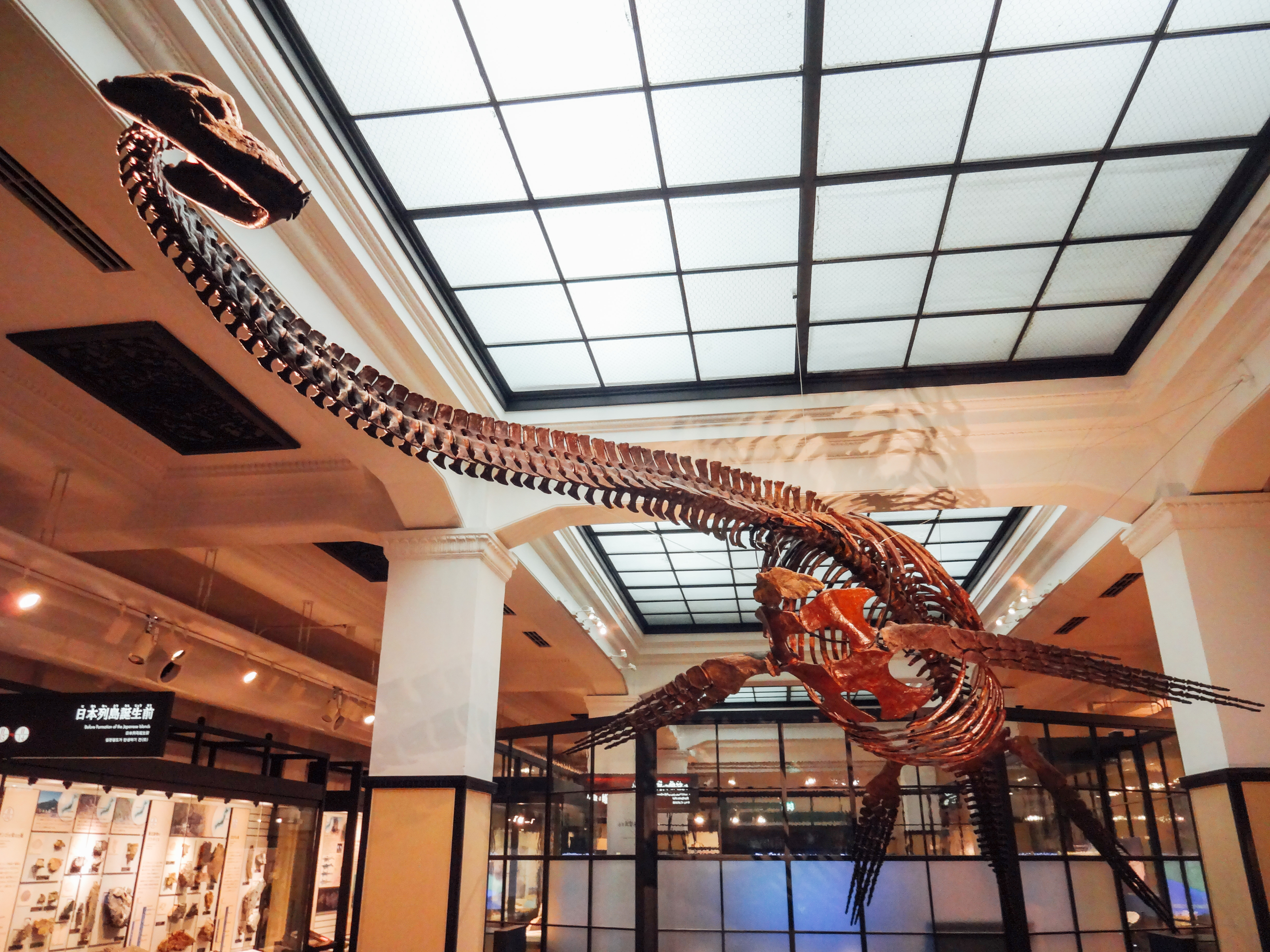
- Reconstructed skeleton at National Science Museum, Tokyo

Scientific classification
- Kingdom: Animalia
- Phylum: Chordata
- Class: Reptilia
- Superorder: †Sauropterygia
- Order: †Plesiosauria
- Superfamily: †Plesiosauroidea
- Family: †Elasmosauridae
- Genus: †Futabasaurus; Sato, Hasegawa & Manabe, 2006
- Species: †F. suzukii

Binomial name
- †Futabasaurus suzukii Sato, Hasegawa & Manabe, 2006

= Futabasaurus =

Futabasaurus Temporal range: Late Cretaceous (Santonian) 86.3–85 Ma

Extinct genus of reptiles

Futabasaurus is a genus of plesiosaur from the Late Cretaceous of Fukushima, Japan. It was described and named in 2006, and was assigned to the family Elasmosauridae. The genus contains one species, F. suzukii.

== Description ==
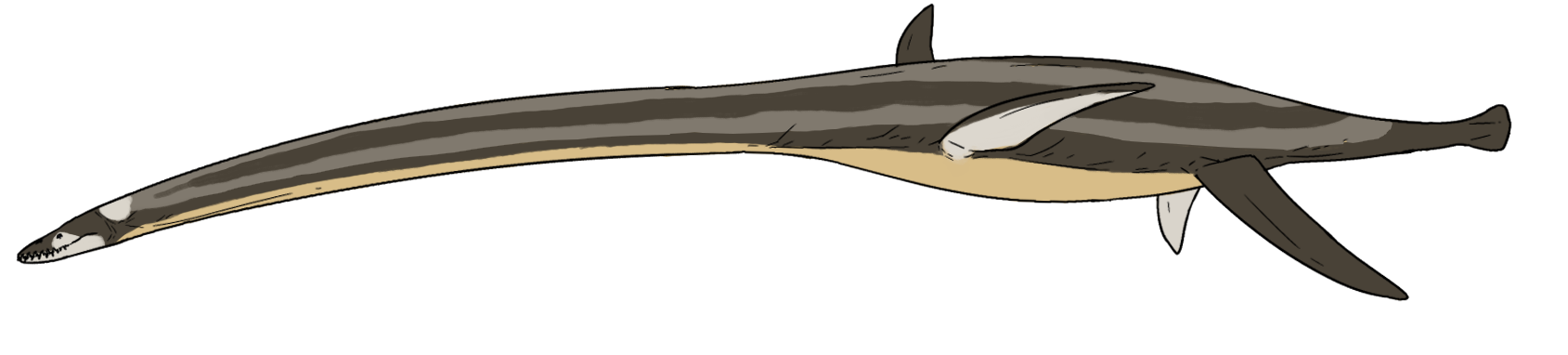
Life restoration

Futabasaurus has been estimated over 6 metres (20 ft) in length, possibly within the range of 6.4–9.2 metres (21–30 ft). It can be distinguished from other elasmosaurids by the following characteristics: there is a long distance between the eye sockets and nostrils; the interclavicles and clavicles are fused, and the anterior edge is bent; the humerus is relatively long; and the femora are slim and show prominent muscle scars.

== Discovery and naming ==
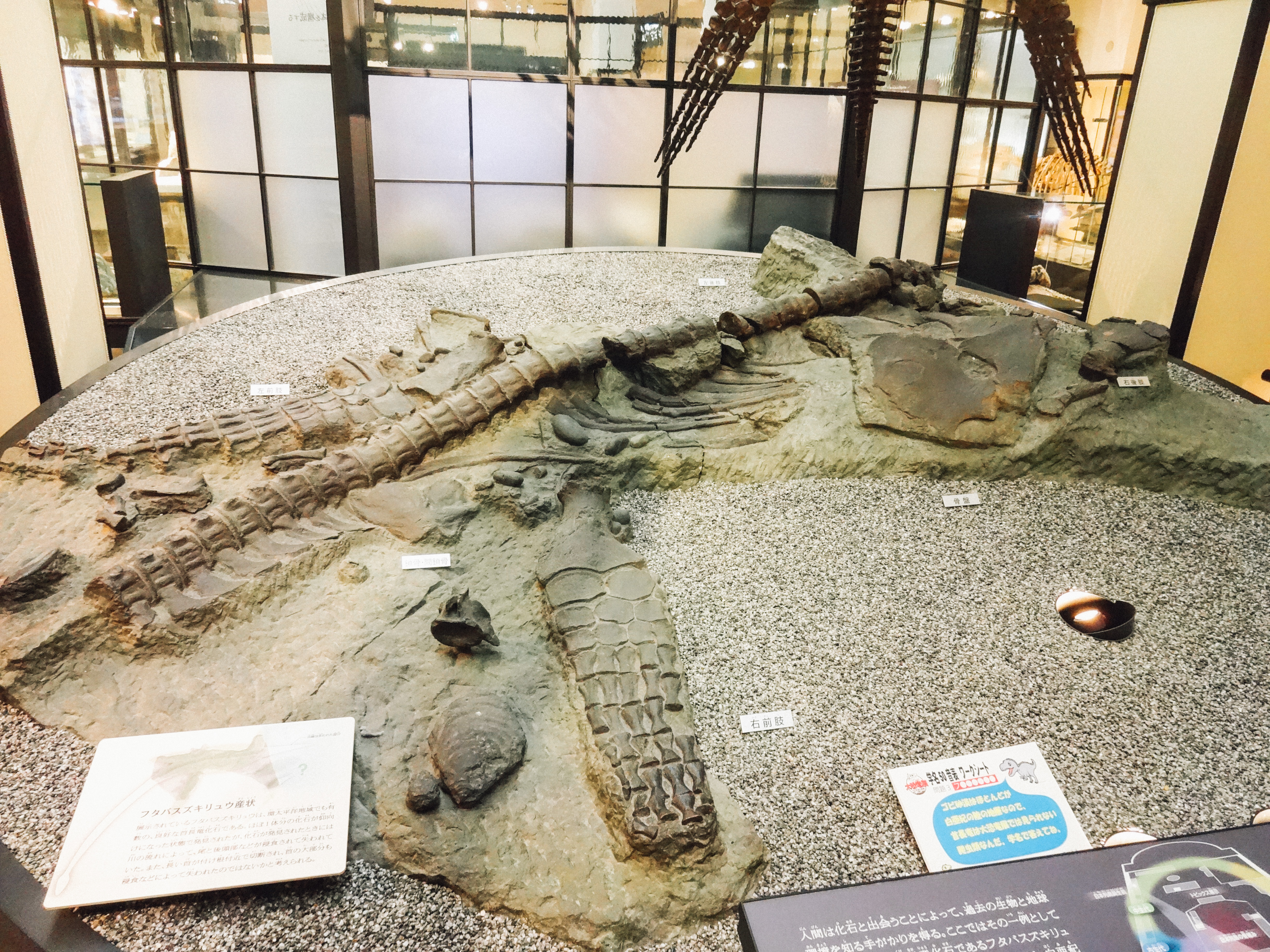
Cast of fossils of Futabasaurus suzukii exhibited at the National Museum of Nature and Science, Tokyo, Japan.

Futabasaurus is the first elasmosaurid found in Japan. It was originally known as either "Wellesisaurus suzukii" or "Futaba Suzuki ryu" before publication. The type specimen of Futabasaurus was found in the Irimazawa Member of the Tamayama Formation, in the Futaba Group of Fukushima Prefecture, Japan. The rocks in which it were found date to the Inoceramus amakusensis zone of the early Santonian. The fossils were found by Tadashi Suzuki, then a high school student. Many of the bones of the type specimen show signs of apparent scavenging or predation by sharks, specifically Cretalamna.

The genus Futabasaurus was named after the Futaba Group, in which it was discovered; the specific name is derived from the family name of its discoverer, Suzuki.

The name "Futabasaurus" has also been used for an unrelated theropod dinosaur, from the Late Cretaceous Ashizawa Formation of Japan. However, this dinosaur was not officially named, and remains a nomen nudum.

== Classification ==
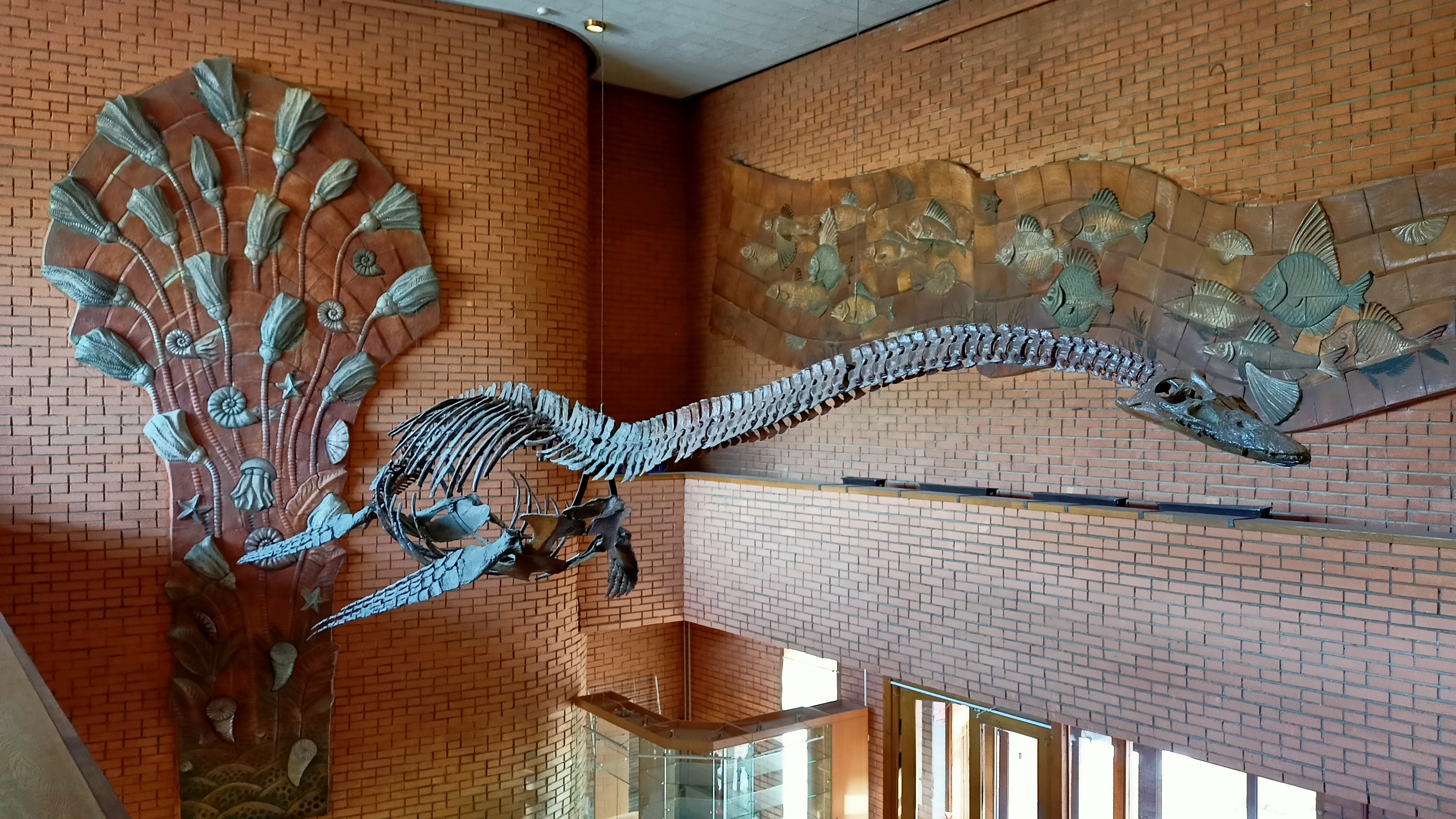
Pre-2006 skeletal mount which is informally labelled as "Wellesisaurus suzukii", Moscow Paleontological Museum

The following cladogram shows the placement of Futabasaurus within Elasmosauridae following an analysis by Rodrigo A. Otero, 2016:

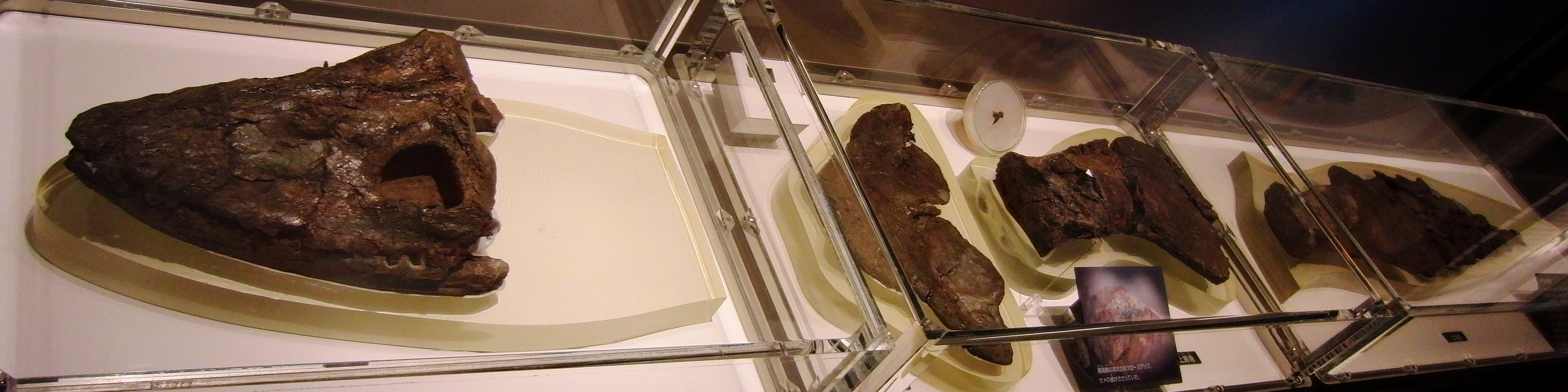
Fossils

- Elasmosauridae
  - Eromangasaurus carinognathus
  - - Callawayasaurus colombiensis
    - - Libonectes morgani
      - - - Tuarangisaurus keyesi
          - Thalassomedon haningtoni
        - - CM Zfr 115
          - - Hydrotherosaurus alexandrae
            - Futabasaurus suzukii
        - - Aristonectinae
            - Kaiwhekea katiki
            - - Alexandronectes zealandiensis
              - - Morturneria seymourensis
                - - Aristonectes parvidens
                  - Aristonectes quiriquinensis
          - Elasmosaurinae
            - Terminonatator pointeixensis
            - - - Elasmosaurus platyurus
                - Albertonectes vanderveldei
              - - Styxosaurus sp. (="Hydralmosaurus serpentinus")
                - - Styxosaurus snowii
                  - Styxosaurus browni

== In popular culture ==
In the anime movie, Doraemon: Nobita's Dinosaur, Nobita finds a fossilized futabasaurus egg. Using Doraemon's time wrapping cloth gadget, he makes the egg viable, hatches the egg, and raises it to adulthood before returning it to its time period.

== See also ==
- List of plesiosaur genera
- Timeline of plesiosaur research
