= Katiki Formation =

Late Cretaceous geologic formation in New Zealand

- Stratigraphic range: Campanian-Maastrichtian (Haumurian); ~83.5–66 Ma
- Type: Geological formation
- Overlies: Herbert Formation
- Thickness: 100 m (330 ft)

Lithology
- Primary: Siltstone

Location
- Coordinates: 45.5°S 170.8°E
- Approximate paleocoordinates: 60.3°S 153.5°E
- Region: South Island
- Country: New Zealand

Type section
- Named by: McKay
- Year defined: 1887
- Katiki Formation (New Zealand)

The Katiki Formation is a Late Cretaceous (Campanian to Maastrichtian, or Haumurian in the regional stratigraphy) geologic formation of the South Island of New Zealand. Plesiosaur remains of Kaiwhekea katiki, named after the formation, are among the fossils that have been recovered from the deltaic siltstones.

== Description ==
The Katiki Formation was defined by McKay in 1887 and comprises about 100 metres (330 ft) of gently north to northeast dipping and generally massive, dark grey, indurated, sandy siltstones. The Katiki Formation overlies more proximal marine sandstones of the Herbert Formation and, below that, non-marine quartzose sandy to pebbly coal measures of the Shag Point Group.

== Fossil content ==
- Belemnites
  - Dimitobelus (Dimitocamax) hectori
- Reptiles
  - Mosasauridae indet.
  - Elasmosauridae
    - Kaiwhekea katiki
- Dinophyceae
  - Gonyaulacaceae
    - Cribroperidinium edwardsii
  - Peridiniaceae
    - Chatangiella campbellensis
    - Palaeocystodinium granulatum

== See also ==
- Plesiosaur stratigraphic distribution
- South Polar region of the Cretaceous
- Conway Formation
- Tahora Formation
