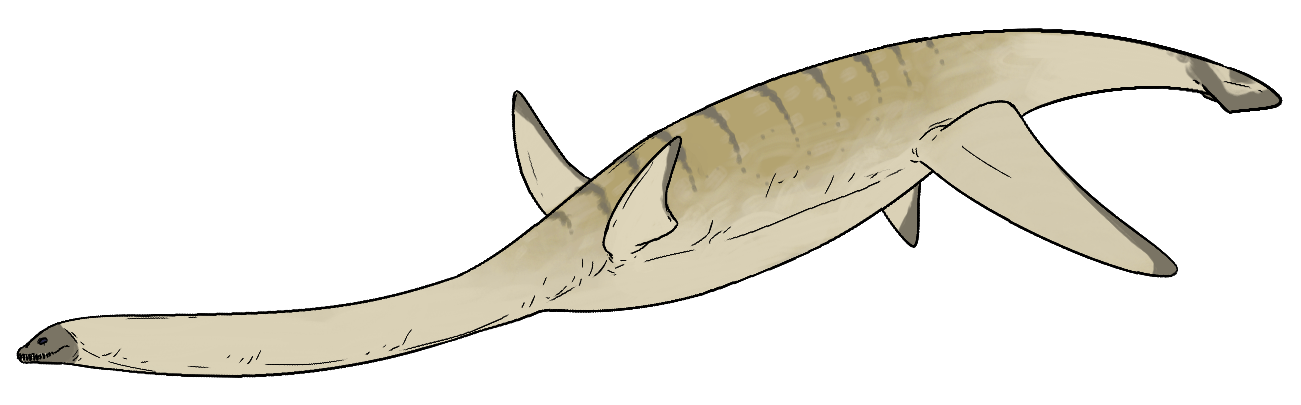
- Restoration

Scientific classification
- Kingdom: Animalia
- Phylum: Chordata
- Class: Reptilia
- Superorder: †Sauropterygia
- Order: †Plesiosauria
- Superfamily: †Plesiosauroidea
- Family: †Elasmosauridae
- Subfamily: †Aristonectinae
- Genus: †Kaiwhekea; Cruickshank & Fordyce, 2002

Type species
- †Kaiwhekea katiki Cruickshank & Fordyce, 2002

= Kaiwhekea =

Kaiwhekea Temporal range: Late Cretaceous, 70–69 Ma

Extinct genus of reptiles

Kaiwhekea ([ˌkaiˈfɛkɛa]) is an extinct genus of plesiosaur from the Late Cretaceous (Maastrichtian age) of what is now New Zealand.

== History of discovery ==
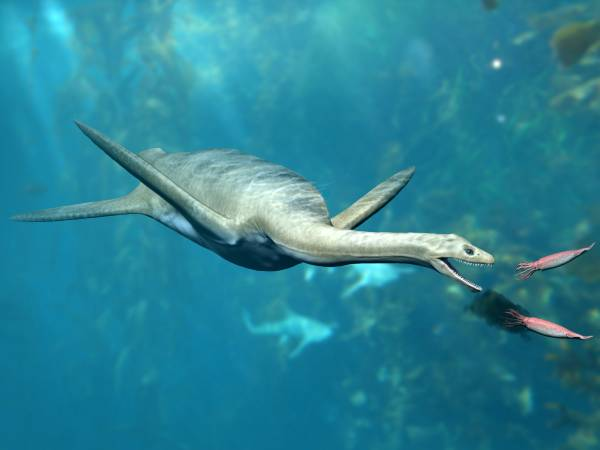
Restoration

The holotype was discovered in 1983 by Gary Raper, an amateur fossil collector, at the base of a cliff at Shag Point, Otago. It was later recovered by a team from the University of Otago's Geology department. The specimen was enclosed in a large concretion measuring c. 6.5 metres long and weighing an estimated 10 tons. The block was split along natural seams and dragged out on a sledge (made from a car bonnet). The skeleton is mostly preserved as negative moulds as the mineralised bone was too fragile to be preserved.

The type species, Kaiwhekea katiki, was first described by Arthur Cruickshank and Ewan Fordyce in 2002. The genus name comes from the Māori words kai meaning "food" and whekea meaning "squid", together meaning "squid-eater". The specific epithet refers to Kātiki Beach, to the north of the find location.

Kaiwhekea was approximately 6.5–7 metres (21–23 ft) long. It lived around 70-69 million years ago. The single known specimen, found in the Katiki Formation near Shag Point on the coast of Otago, is nearly complete, and is on display at the Otago Museum in Dunedin, New Zealand.

== Classification ==
Kaiwhekea has been placed as an aristonectine plesiosaur close to Aristonectes. In 2010, Kaiwhekea was transferred to Leptocleididae, but more recent analyses do not find the same result.

The following cladogram shows the placement of Kaiwhekea within Elasmosauridae following an analysis by Rodrigo A. Otero, 2016:

- Elasmosauridae
  - Eromangasaurus carinognathus
  - - Callawayasaurus colombiensis
    - - Libonectes morgani
      - - - Tuarangisaurus keyesi
          - Thalassomedon haningtoni
        - - CM Zfr 115
          - - Hydrotherosaurus alexandrae
            - Futabasaurus suzukii
        - - Aristonectinae
            - Kaiwhekea katiki
            - - Alexandronectes zealandiensis
              - - Morturneria seymourensis
                - - Aristonectes parvidens
                  - Aristonectes quiriquinensis
          - Elasmosaurinae
            - Terminonatator pointeixensis
            - - - Elasmosaurus platyurus
                - Albertonectes vanderveldei
              - - Styxosaurus sp. (="Hydralmosaurus serpentinus")
                - - Styxosaurus snowii
                  - Styxosaurus browni

== See also ==
- List of plesiosaur genera
- Timeline of plesiosaur research
