= Futaba Group =

Geologic formation in Japan

- Stratigraphic range: Coniacian–Santonian
- Type: Geological group
- Sub-units: Ashizawa Formation, Kasamatsu Formation, Tamayama Formation
- Underlies: Unconformity with Paleogene Shiramizu Group
- Overlies: Early Cretaceous Granite, Permian shale and sandstone
- Thickness: Over 300 metres

Lithology
- Primary: Sandstone, siltstone, conglomerate

Location
- Region: northern Honshu
- Country: Japan

The Futaba Group is a Late Cretaceous geologic group in Japan. Dinosaur remains are among the fossils that have been recovered from the formation, although none have yet been referred to a specific genus. It consists of both fluvial and shallow marine sediments. The plesiosaur Futabasaurus was found in this unit (specifically the Tamayama Formation).

== See also ==
- List of dinosaur-bearing rock formations
  - List of stratigraphic units with indeterminate dinosaur fossils
