= Tamayama Formation =

Geologic formation in Japan

- Stratigraphic range: Coniacian–Santonian
- Type: Geological formation
- Unit of: Futaba Group
- Sub-units: Kohisagawa Member, Irimaza Member
- Underlies: Unconformity with the Eocene Iwaki Formation
- Overlies: Kasamatsu Formation
- Thickness: ~ 150 metres

Lithology
- Primary: Sandstone
- Other: Siltstone

Location
- Region: northern Honshu
- Country: Japan

The Tamayama Formation is a Coniacian-Santonian geologic formation in Japan. Dinosaur remains not referrable to the genus level are among the fossils that have been recovered from the formation. The lower and middle part of the formation consists of braided river sandstone, while the upper portion consists of upper shoreface to inner shelf sandstone. Vertebrate taxa from the formation include Futabasaurus and Cretalamna, along with titanosauriform teeth and neosuchian remains. Seeds of the nymphaeales plant Symphaenale futabensis are also known from this formation.

== Fossils ==
=== Paleofauna ===
- Futabasaurus suzukii
- Cretalamna appendiculata
- Inoceramus
  - Inoceramus amakusensis
  - Inoceramus mihoensis
- Apiotrigonia minor
- Glycymeris? sp.
- Archaeromma chisatoi
- Ovaliblatta iwakiensis
- Titanosauriformes indet.
- Neosuchia indet.

=== Paleoflora ===
- Symphaenale futabensis
- Esgueiria sp.
- Hironoia sp.

== See also ==
- List of dinosaur-bearing rock formations
  - List of stratigraphic units with few dinosaur genera
