= Iwaki Formation =

Geologic formation in Japan

- Stratigraphic range: Eocene–early Oligocene
- Type: Geological formation
- Unit of: Shiramizu Group
- Overlies: Unconformity with the Tamayama Formation

Location
- Location: Iwaki, Fukushima
- Coordinates: 37°06′54.2″N 140°50′26.6″E
- Country: Japan

The Iwaki Formation is a palaeontological formation located in Iwaki, Fukushima, Japan. It dates to Eocene and early Oligocene periods. The formation contains three families of Artiodactyla–Anthracotheriidae, Entelodontidae, and Hypertragulidae.

== Paleofauna ==
- Anthracotheriidae indet.
- Entelodontidae indet.
- Hypertragulidae indet.

== See also ==
- List of fossil sites
