= Conway Formation =

Geologic formation in New Zealand

- Stratigraphic range: Campanian-Maastrichtian
- Type: Geological formation
- Unit of: Eyre Group
- Underlies: Loburn Mudstone
- Overlies: Broken River Formation

Lithology
- Primary: Sandstone, siltstone

Location
- Coordinates: 42.6°S 173.5°E
- Approximate paleocoordinates: 57.7°S 149.1°W
- Region: Canterbury
- Country: New Zealand
- Extent: South Island
- Conway Formation (New Zealand)

The Conway Formation, previously known as the Laidmore Formation, is a Campanian to Danian geologic formation in the South Island of New Zealand and therefore crosses the Cretaceous–Paleogene boundary. Plesiosaur remains are among the fossils that have been recovered from its strata. The Conway Formation is part of the Eyre Group and Haerenga Supergroup.

== Fossil content ==
Among others, the following fossils have been found in the formation:

Color key: Taxon / Reclassified taxon / Taxon falsely reported as present / Dubious taxon or junior synonym / Ichnotaxon / Ootaxon / Morphotaxon	Notes; Uncertain or tentative taxa are in small text; ~~crossed out~~ taxa are discredited.

=== Mosasaurs ===
Mosasaurs of the Conway Formation
Genus	Species	Location	Stratigraphic position	Material	Notes	Image
Prognathodon	P. waiparaensis				A prognathodontin mosasaurine	
Taniwhasaurus	T. oweni				A tylosaurine mosasaurid	

=== Plesiosaurs ===
Plesiosaurs of the Conway Formation
Genus	Species	Location	Stratigraphic position	Material	Notes	Image
Alexandronectes	A. zealandiensis				A aristonectine elasmosaurid	
Mauisaurus	M. ?haasti				A elasmosaurid plesiosaur	

=== Fish ===
==== Cartilaginous Fish ====
Cartilaginous Fish of the Conway Formation
Genus	Species	Location	Stratigraphic position	Material	Notes	Image
Australopristis	A. wiffeni				A sawskate	

== See also ==
- Tahora Formation
- Plesiosaur stratigraphic distribution
- Geology of Canterbury, New Zealand
- Stratigraphy of New Zealand
- South Polar region of the Cretaceous
