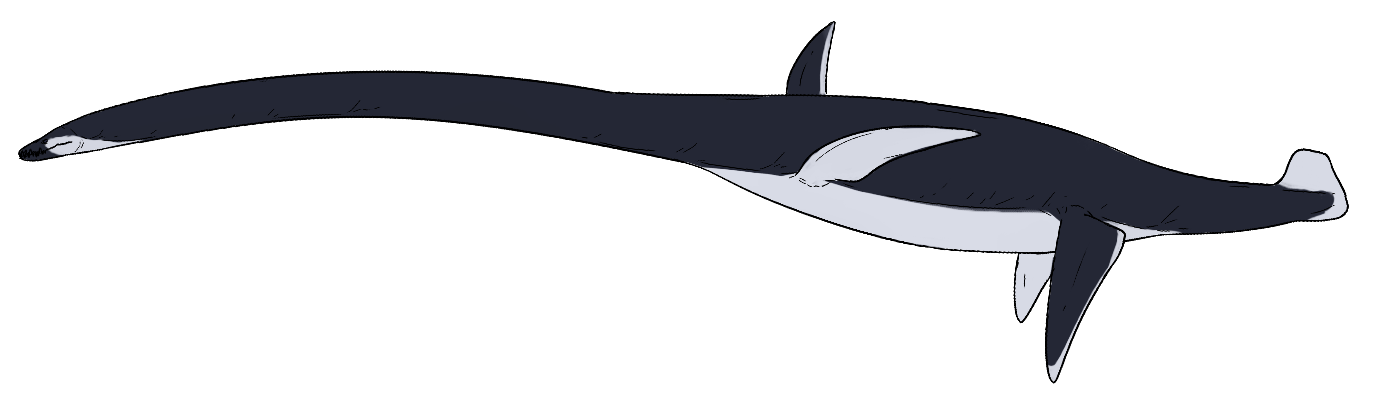
- Life restoration

Scientific classification
- Kingdom: Animalia
- Phylum: Chordata
- Class: Reptilia
- Superorder: †Sauropterygia
- Order: †Plesiosauria
- Superfamily: †Plesiosauroidea
- Family: †Elasmosauridae
- Subfamily: †Aristonectinae
- Genus: †Alexandronectes; Otero et al., 2016
- Species: †A. zealandiensis

Binomial name
- †Alexandronectes zealandiensis Otero et al., 2016

= Alexandronectes =

Alexandronectes Temporal range: Maastrichtian ~ 72–66 Ma

Extinct genus of reptiles

Alexandronectes is a genus of elasmosaurid plesiosaur, a type of long-necked marine reptile, that lived in the oceans of Late Cretaceous New Zealand. It contains one species, A. zealandiensis. Fossils of Alexandronectes were found in the Conway Formation of Canterbury, which can be dated to the Early Maastrichtian stage of the Cretaceous. Fossils of it were found around 1872 near the Waipara River, north of Christchurch, New Zealand.

Alexandronectes belongs to the elasmosaurid subfamily Aristonectinae based on the pterygoid structure and an A-shaped squamosal arch. However, it differs from other aristonectines in its smaller skull, different paroccipital processes, and different mandibular glenoid. A 2021 study used CT scans to create digital reconstructions of the holotype, and detected the stapes in the inner ear, marking the first time this bone has been found in an aristonectine. The study also found a recess in the floccular lobe of the cerebellum, which may have functioned to stabilise both the head and the retinal image of Alexandronectes. This is the first occurrence of this feature in an elasmosaurid.

Fossils of unknown animal were found in New Zealand, in a basin of the middle Waipara River, on the north of Christchurch (possible coordinates 43°03'24 S, 172°34'52 W). Fossils lied between rock of the Conway Formation, built of soft, erosive, but massive dark gray mudstones and mud sandstones with intensive marks of bioturbation and big spherical calcareous concretions from the end of Cretaceous, from Maastrichtian. The rocks probably precipitated in the environment of small oxygen capacity, in waters not stirred by strong current or waves. Previously in the rocks of aforementioned formation fossils of Teleostei, shark teeth, brachiopods, plant remains and dinoflagellates had been found, the latter used to date another ones. Aforementioned specimen was buried in a dinoflagellate A. acutulum layer.

Fossils were found by Alexander McKay. A precise date he found them is not known, but according to Canterbury Museum catalog it had to be before 1888. The specimen was cataloged as M Zfr 73 and CM Zfr 91. It comprised two elements of cranium. Zfr 73 contained part of mandible with quadrate bone and squamosal bone, with preserved paroccipital process. Zfr 91 comprised part of cranium (big cranium, as Hiller and Mannering would point out later) comprising fragment of right pterygoid bone, basisphenoid bone, basioccipital bone, crushed rights squamosal bone and quadrate bone. Initially these specimens were thought to originate from different individuals.

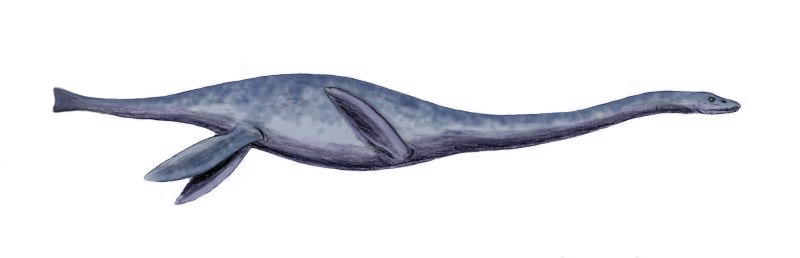
Hiller & Mannering compared the specimen to sympatric Mauisaurus haasti

The situation changed with publication of paper by Hiller and Mannering in 2004 in a journal published by Canterbury Museum, where the fossils had been transported to. Researches concluded that both cranial fragments had originated from the same individual, a big plesiosaur. Indeed, as Otero et al. had found, fragments in debate comprises complelemtary cranial parts, their sizes have corresponding sizes, there are no overlapping elements and the mineralisation level is the same. What is more, a way the bones had been damaged by crushing, erosion and disintegration was the same. Hiller & Mannering compared the specimen to sympatric Mauisaurus haasti, however, in a systematic chapter of their paper they described the specimen as simply unidentified Elasmosauridae.

Mentioned paper put the specimen in rich fauna of New Zealand late Cretaceous plesiosaurs, seven species of which had been described earlier, besides part of them becoming nomina dubia. Of the ones assumed valid nowadays one can mention Kaiwhekea, described in 2002 and classified by Cruickshank et al. to the Cryptoclididae family, and later do Aristonectidae (degraded subsequently to Aristonectinae), and Tuarangisaurus belonging to elasmosaurid family, but not to Aristonectinae, and finally Mauisaurus, described by Hector yet in 19th century. Besides, in New Zealand unidentified fossils of Polycotylidae and Pliosauroidea were found.

However, the discussed specimen distinguished from plesiosaurs known before due to earlier unobserved combination of characteristics. Its cranium was a bit shorter and narrower than these belonging to Aristonectes and Kaiwhekea, taller than Aristonectes one, but lower than those of Kaiwhekea. An articular surface of a temporomandibular joint was rounded, thick and somewhat similar to observed in Kaiwhekea. A squamosal bone had dorsal process pointed posterolaterally, it made A-shaped recess. According to Otero et al., this is one more trait resembling Kaiwhekea, however, they found a difference in stouter dorsal rami. On the other side, paroccipital process does not resemble its homologous counterparts in other Aristonectinae in the matter of size, as it is shorter and more corpulent. Its distal end is widened dorsoventrally and flattened axially, with its dorsal surface concave and convex ventral one. It can be compared to Libonectes one.

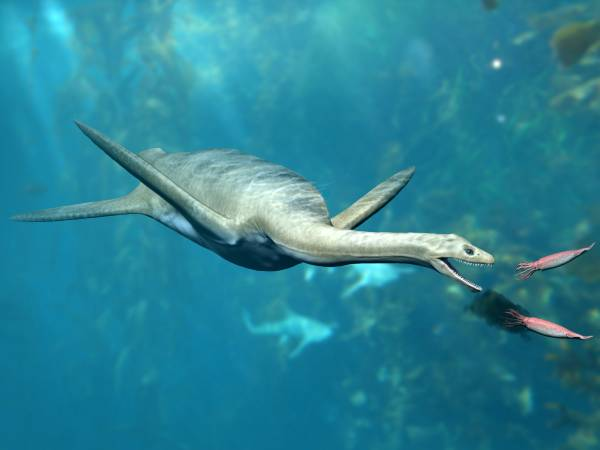
Kaiwhekea, either from New Zealand, was the closest kin of Alexandronectes

In 2016 Otero, R. A., O'Gorman, J. P., Hiller, N., O'Keefe, F. R. & Fordyce, R. E. published in Journal of Vertebrate Paleontology a paper titled Alexandronectes zealandiensis gen. et sp. nov., a new aristonectine plesiosaur from the lower Maastrichtian of New Zealand, making a formal description of a new plesiosaur genus and species. The generic name honors Alexander McKay, who discovered its bones. It this genus a single species was put, namely Alexandronectes zealandiensis. Its specific epithet appeals to microcontinent of Zealandia, a land mass that broke away from supercontinent Gondwana in late Cretaceous epoch and contained areas of what is nowadays New Zealand.

Researchers classified that animal in elasmosaurid family and Aristonectinae subfamily. They conducted a phylogenetic analysis, concerning 24 plesiosaur genera and 91 traits. It resulted in a strict consensus trees, according to which closest kin of Alexandronectes was Kaiwhekea.
