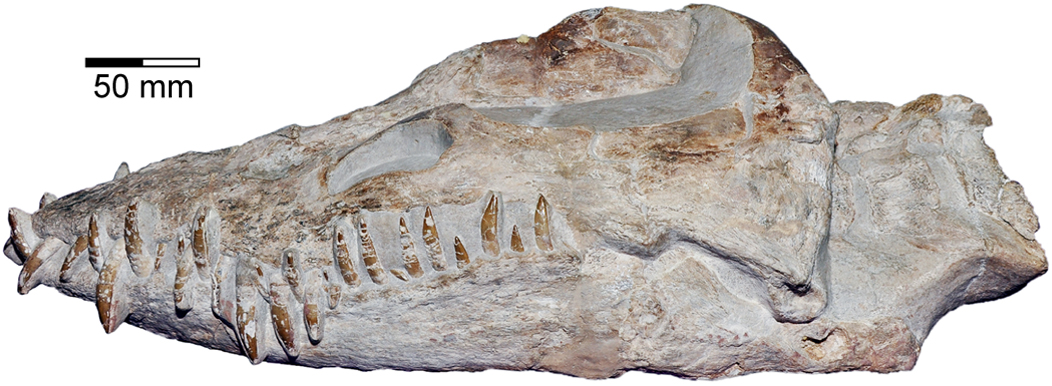
- Skull SMNK PAL 3978

Scientific classification
- Kingdom: Animalia
- Phylum: Chordata
- Class: Reptilia
- Superorder: †Sauropterygia
- Order: †Plesiosauria
- Superfamily: †Plesiosauroidea
- Family: †Elasmosauridae
- Genus: †Libonectes; Carpenter, 1997
- Species: †L. morgani

Binomial name
- †Libonectes morgani (Welles, 1949) [originally Elasmosaurus]

Synonyms
- Elasmosaurus morgani Welles, 1949; Libonectes atlasense Buchy, 2005

= Libonectes =

Libonectes Temporal range: Late Cretaceous, 93 Ma

Extinct genus of reptiles

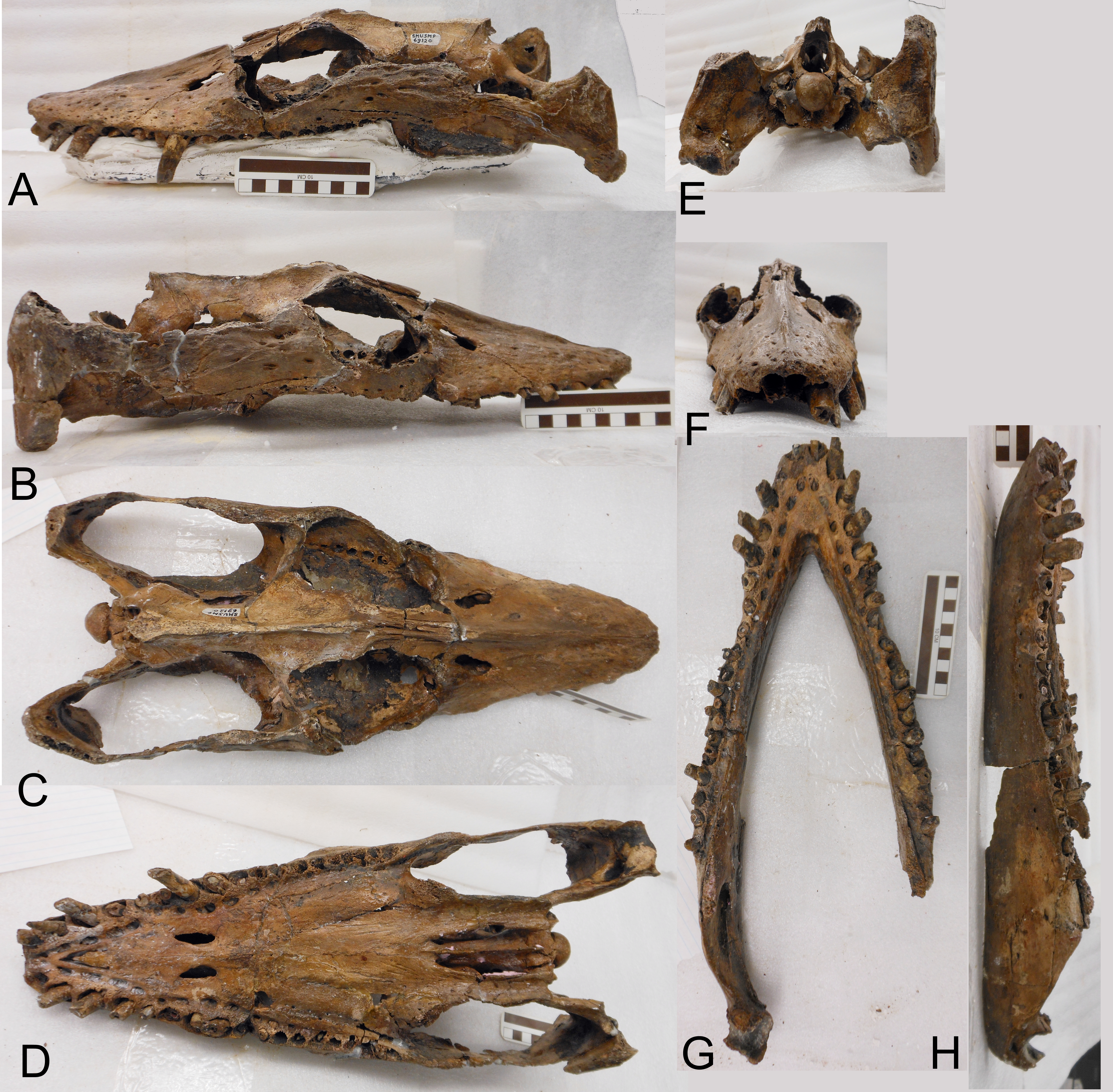
Holotype skull of Libonectes morgani

Libonectes is an extinct genus of sauropterygian reptile belonging to the plesiosaur order. It is known from specimens found in the Britton Formation of Texas (USA) and the Akrabou Formation of Morocco, which have been dated to the lower Turonian stage of the late Cretaceous period.

== Nomenclature ==
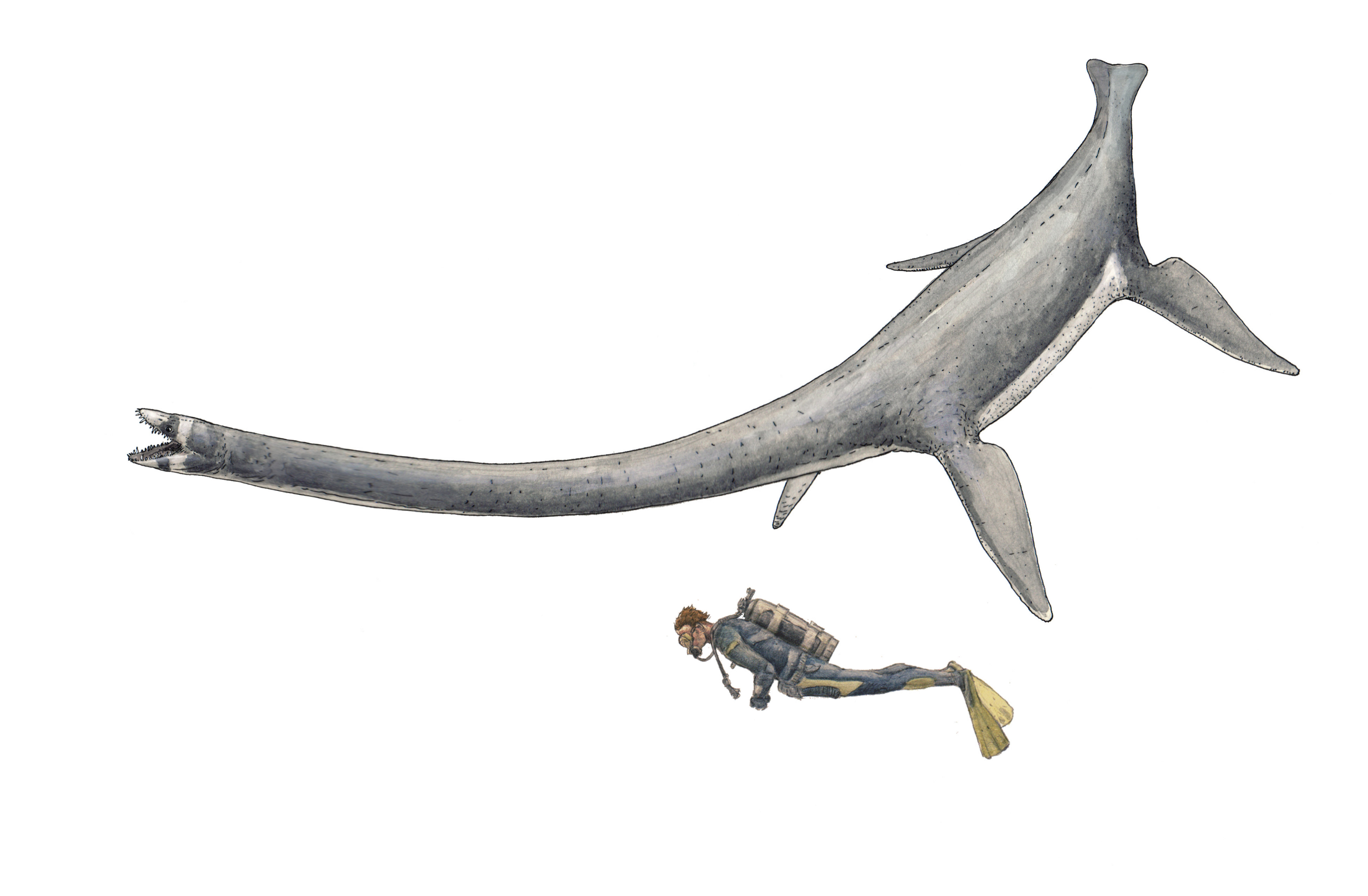
Life restoration

The prefix "libo" comes from Greek (lips), and means "southern (wind)," translated to English. "Nectes," the suffix, is also from Greek (nektes), and translates to "swimmer." In its entirety, Libonectes can be interpreted as "southern swimmer." Libonectes was an elasmosaurid plesiosaur, with many specimens unearthed in southern parts of North America- as a result, it was labeled with such a name as described in the preceding sentence. Charles Gill Morgan is credited with the acquiring and preparation of the first Libonectes fossils, found by tenant farmer T.W. Tidwell in the late 1930s, and it was for this reason that morgani was chosen as the specific name part of its binomial name.

== Description ==
Libonectes was a medium-sized plesiosaur, with the complete specimen (SMNK-PAL 3978) measuring 7.2 metres (24 ft) long. The type specimen belonged to an individual with a neck measuring 5.06 metres (16.6 ft) long. The animal was very similar to the related Thalassomedon, though the structure of the neck vertebrae was different, with taller neural spines and longer supporting processes of the bone, and its nostrils were slightly closer to the tip of the skull. The type specimen of L. morgani contains the best preserved elasmosaurid skull known as well as gastroliths. A shoulder girdle and flippers were also found but were apparently discarded at some point atter 1962, along with the rear fourteen neck vertebrae of which only forty-eight remain.

The specimen was originally named Elasmosaurus morgani by Welles in 1949, but it was reclassified to its own genus by Carpenter in 1997. A second species, L. atlasense, was named in 2005 from deposits in Morocco, but a 2017 redescription of the material recognized it as a junior synonym of L. morgani.

== Feeding Habits ==
The possible carnivorous nature of Libonectes is suggested by its dental layout, however, the presence of gastroliths inside some known fossils feasibly indicates an omnivorous lifestyle (though paleontological investigation notes that plesiosaurs may have used gastroliths in buoyancy control). The presence of these gastroliths could also point to the possibility that Libonectes swallowed prey items whole. Libonectes most likely hunted in deep waters, perhaps eating small fish and ammonites, as it is thought that its bulk prevented the creature from frequenting shallow waters. This reptile is also suspected to have used its large size to trap prey, as a result of its slow swimming speed.

== See also ==
- List of plesiosaur genera
- Timeline of plesiosaur research
