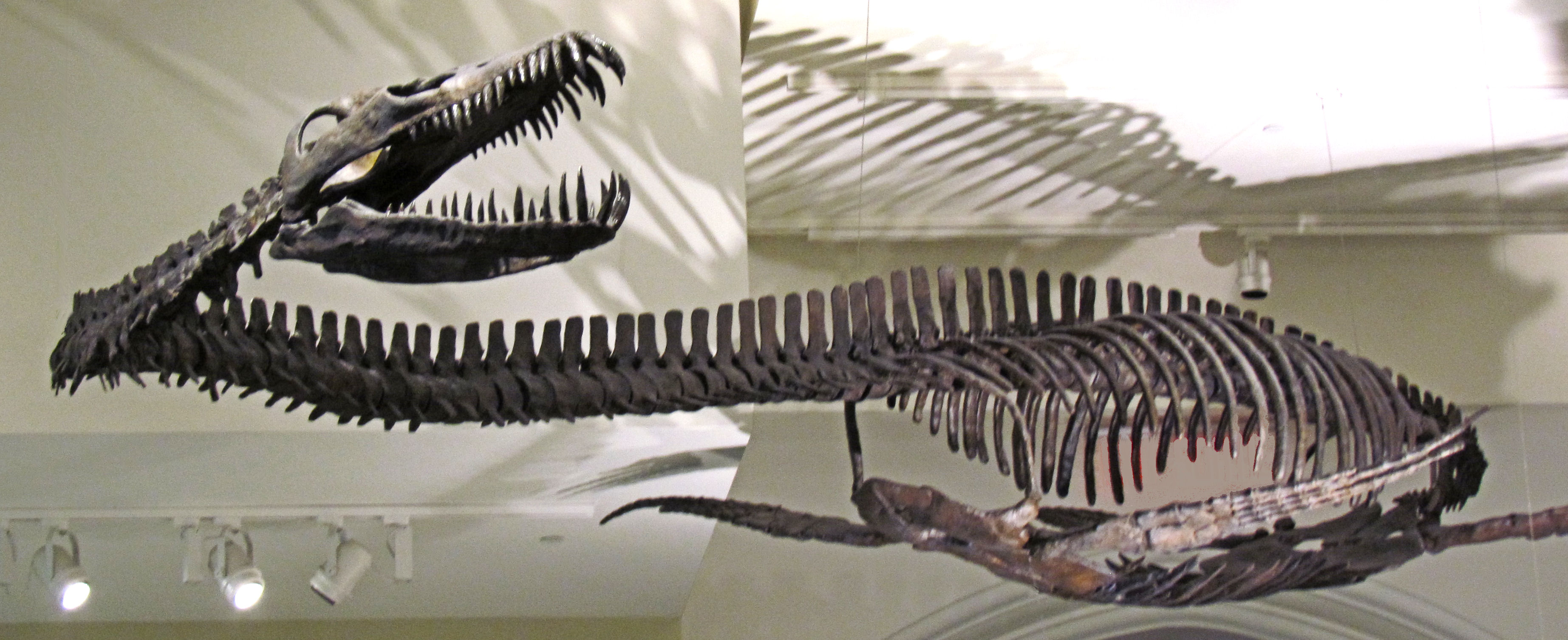
- Reconstructed skeleton in the Canadian Museum of Nature

Scientific classification
- Kingdom: Animalia
- Phylum: Chordata
- Class: Reptilia
- Superorder: †Sauropterygia
- Order: †Plesiosauria
- Superfamily: †Plesiosauroidea
- Family: †Elasmosauridae
- Genus: †Traskasaura; O'Keefe et al., 2025
- Species: †T. sandrae

Binomial name
- †Traskasaura sandrae O'Keefe et al., 2025

= Traskasaura =

Traskasaura Temporal range: Late Cretaceous (Santonian), ~86–84 Ma

Genus of plesiosaurs

Traskasaura (meaning "Trask lizard") is an extinct genus of basal elasmosaurid plesiosaurs from the Late Cretaceous (Santonian age) Haslam Formation of British Columbia, Canada. The genus contains a single species, Traskasaura sandrae, known from three partial skeletons. It is the first elasmosaurid discovered in and named from British Columbia.

== Discovery and naming ==
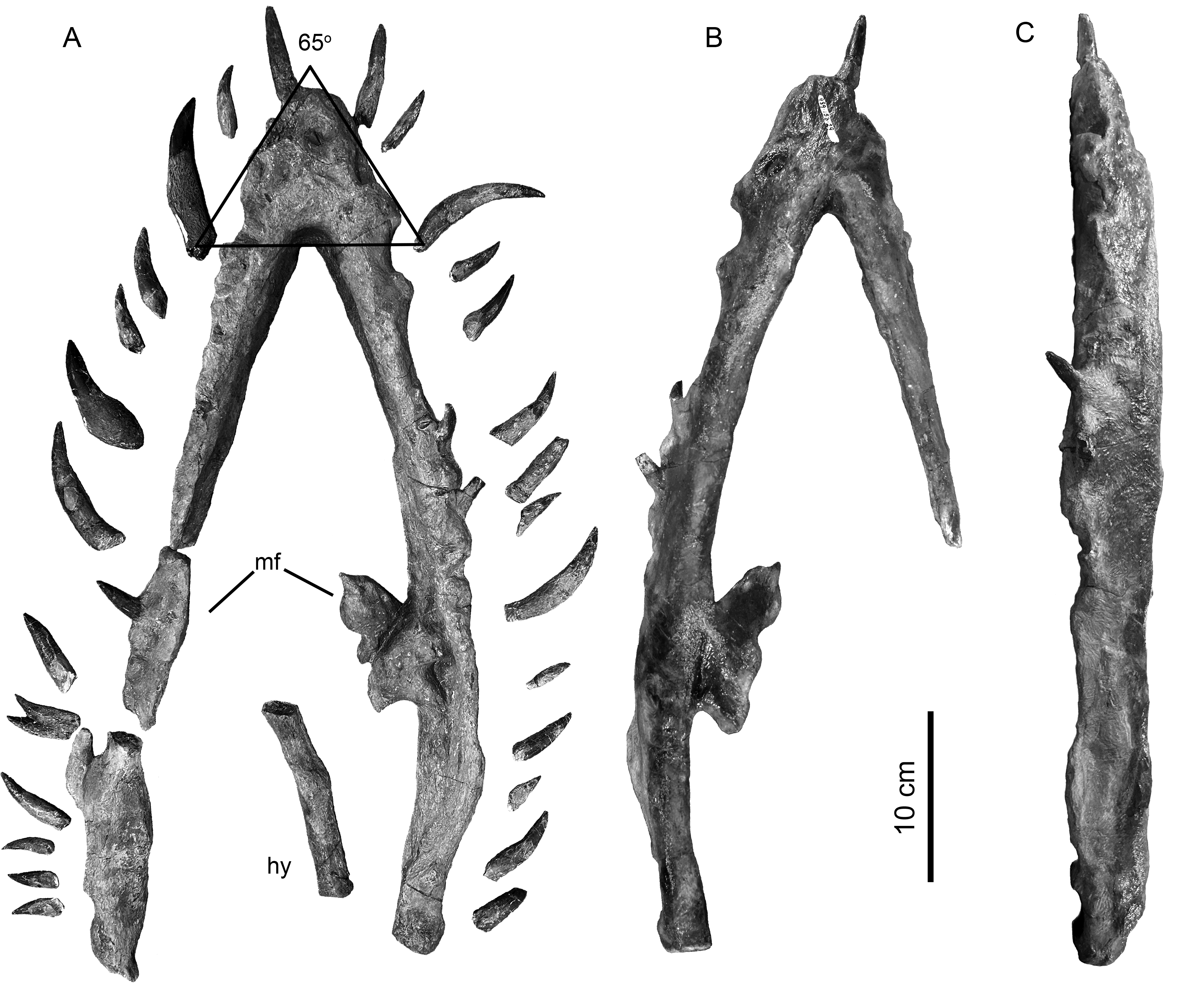
Mandible and teeth of the holotype specimen

The Traskasaura fossil material was discovered in outcrops of the Haslam Formation (Nanaimo Group) on Vancouver Island of British Columbia, Canada. The first discovered specimen was found in November 1988 by Michael Trask and his daughter Heather on the bank of the Puntledge River near Courtenay. Supported by grants from the province of British Columbia, the specimen began to be excavated and studied by Trask with assistance from paleontologists Rolf Ludvigsen and Elizabeth Nicholls. More than 40 local volunteers also assisted in collecting the specimen in 1990 with the help of additional grants. After collection, the skeleton was accessioned as specimen CDM 002 in the Courtenay & District Museum, where it was prepared over the following years. This work revealed the nearly complete, albeit poorly-preserved, skeleton of a fully-grown plesiosaur, with an estimated body length around 10 metres (33 ft). The specimen was noted for representing the first elasmosaurid discovered in British Columbia.

In a 2002 paper detailing the Nanaimo Group fossil marine reptiles, Elizabeth Nicholls and Dirk Meckert preliminarily described CDM 002. They identified it as belonging to an indeterminate elasmosaurid, possibly a previously unrecognized taxon. However, given the poor preservation of the specimen, they refrained from naming it.

A second partial specimen, cataloged as CDM 161, was found in 2020 on the bank of the Trent River near Highway 19. It consists of a mostly articulated, well-preserved skeleton, likely belonging to a young juvenile individual. A third specimen, CDM 2006.8.1, represented by a single right humerus, was found during the construction of this highway. It is intermediate in ossification (an indication of maturity) and size between the two more complete specimens.

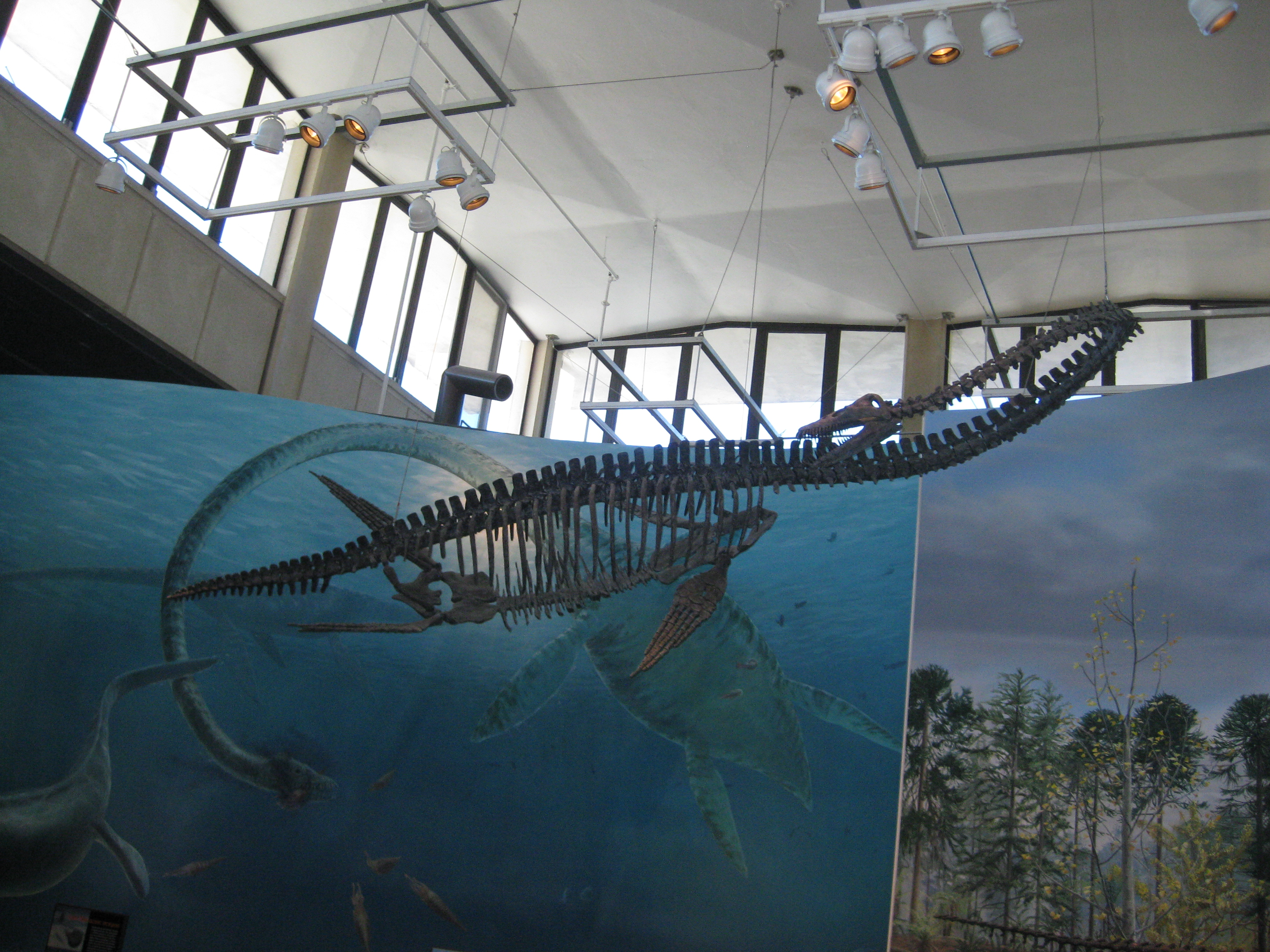
Reconstructed skeleton in Burke Museum

In a 2018 public poll, 48% of responding British Columbian voters selected the then-unnamed "Courtenay elasmosaur" as their preferred "provincial fossil". In 2023, the taxon was officially recognized as the emblematic Provincial Fossil of British Columbia. Prior to receiving a scientific name, the animal was referred to as the "Courtenay elasmosaur", "Puntledge elasmosaur", or "Haslam elasmosaur". The novelty and unique anatomy of the animal was reported in a 2024 conference abstract for the Society of Vertebrate Paleontology's annual meeting.

In 2025, F. Robin O'Keefe and colleagues described Traskasaura sandrae as a new genus and species of plesiosaurs based on these fossil remains. They established CDM 002, the more complete and first discovered specimen, as the holotype specimen, and CDM 161 as the paratype. CDM 2006.8.1, the isolated humerus, was also referred to this species. The discovery of CDM 161 several years after the initial description of CDM 002 allowed for improved anatomical interpretations and comparisons with other taxa. The generic name, Traskasaura, honours Michael and Heather Trask, the discoverers of the holotype. This is combined with "saura", the feminine conjugation of the Ancient Greek σαῦρος (saûros), meaning "lizard". The specific name, sandrae, honours O'Keefe's mother, Sandra Lee O'Keefe (née Markey).

== Classification ==
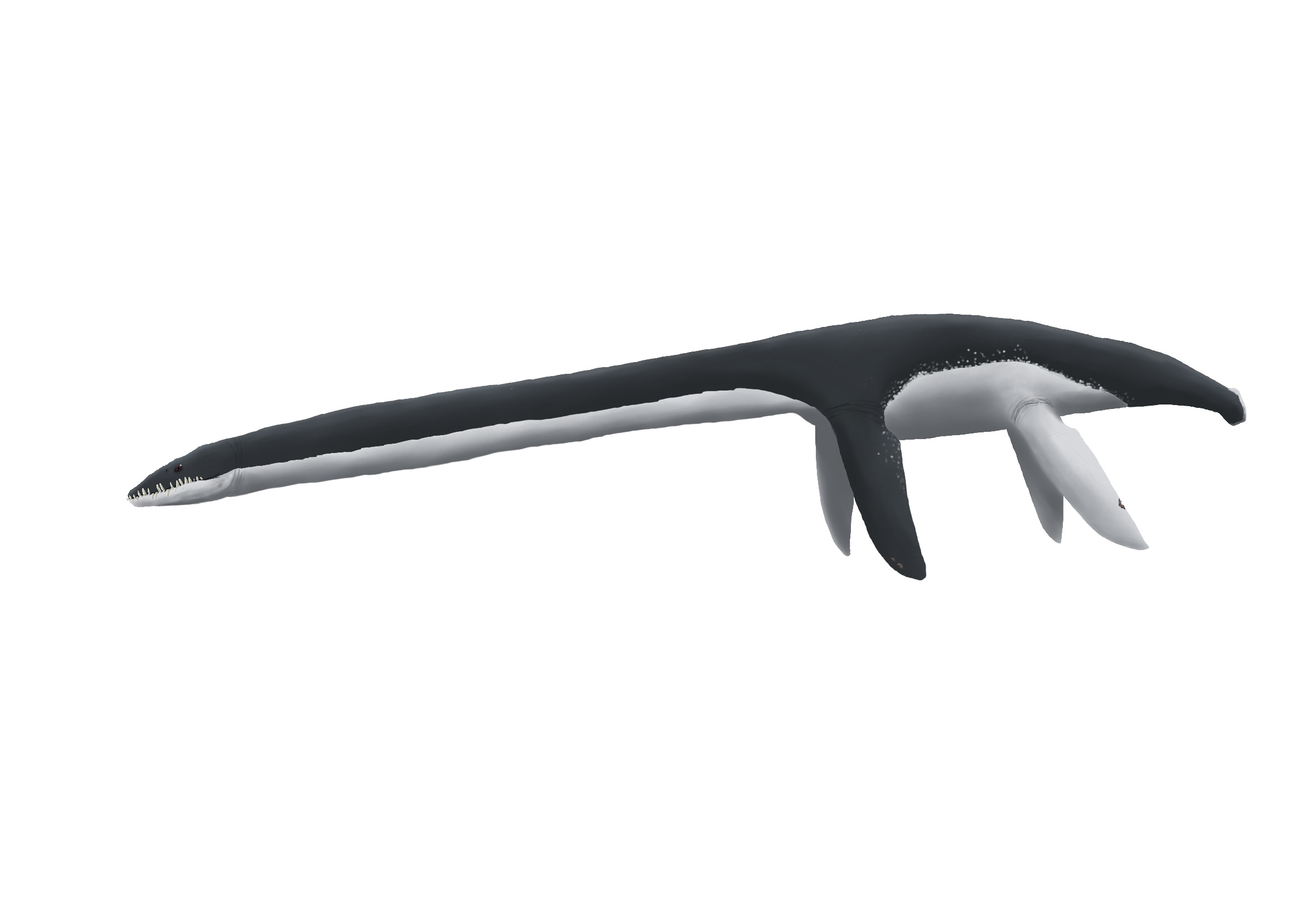
Hypothetical life restoration

The Traskasaura specimens demonstrate a mosaic of several anatomical characteristics seen in both early-diverging (basal) elasmosaurids and the Aristonectinae, an elasmosaurid subfamily known primarily from Antarctica and New Zealand. In fact, early analyses recovered this taxon as a basal aristonectine. However, the alternative hypothesis that the aristonectine traits were convergently evolved was also noted. In their 2025 phylogenetic analysis O'Keefe et al. instead recovered Traskasaura in a basal position within Elasmosauridae, as the sister taxon to Nakonanectes. These results are displayed in the cladogram below:

- Elasmosauridae
  - - Callawayasaurus
    - Eromangasaurus
    - Wapuskanectes
    - Speeton Clay taxon
  - - Lagenanectes
    - - - Traskasaura
        - Nakonanectes
      - - - - Libonectes
            - - Jucha
              - Fluvionectes
          - - Thalassomedon
            - Styxosaurus spp.
        - - - Terminonatator
            - - Albertonectes
              - Elasmosaurus
          - - Zarafasaura
            - - Cardiocorax
              - Weddellonectia
                ⊞ (including Aristonectinae)
                - Tuarangisaurus
                - - Futabasaurus
                  - - - Chubutinectes
                      - - Aphrosaurus
                        - Hydrotherosaurus
                    - - - Morenosaurus
                        - - Vegasaurus
                          - Kawanectes
                      - - Marambionectes
                        - Aristonectinae
                          - Wunyelfia
                          - - MLP 99-XII-1-5
                              (Aristonectinae indet.)
                            - Aristonectes parvidens
                            - Aristonectes quiriquinensis
                            - Kaiwhekea
                            - - Alexandronectes
                              - Morturneria
                ⊟
