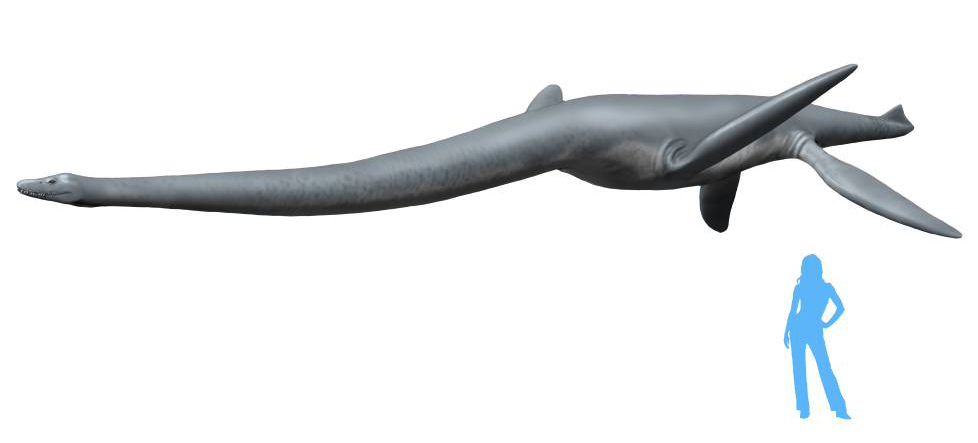
- Restoration

Scientific classification
- Kingdom: Animalia
- Phylum: Chordata
- Class: Reptilia
- Superorder: †Sauropterygia
- Order: †Plesiosauria
- Superfamily: †Plesiosauroidea
- Family: †Elasmosauridae
- Genus: †Hydrotherosaurus; Welles, 1943
- Species: †H. alexandrae

Binomial name
- †Hydrotherosaurus alexandrae Welles, 1943

= Hydrotherosaurus =

Hydrotherosaurus Temporal range: Maastrichtian, ~72.1–66 Ma

Extinct genus of reptiles

Hydrotherosaurus (meaning "fisherman lizard") is an extinct genus of elasmosaurid plesiosaur from the Upper Cretaceous (Maastrichtian stage) Moreno Formation of Fresno County, California, USA. The only known species, H. alexandrae, was named for Annie Montague Alexander in 1943 by Samuel Paul Welles.

== Discovery and naming ==
The first remains of Hydrotherosaurus to be found were several vertebrae discovered by Frank C. Paiva on his own property in the Panoche Hills of Fresno County, California, which were taken to Berkeley in the spring of 1937 by W. M. Tucker, who was the Chairman of the Department of Geology of Fresno State College. Afterwards, Fresno State College and the University of California Museum of Paleontology organized a joint expedition which would uncover a nearly complete fossilized skeleton of the animal, with only parts of the skull, shoulder girdle, flippers and certain vertebral elements missing. This specimen, designated UCMP 33912, was collected in a ravine on the property of the Sun Ray Gypsum Mine, about 22 miles west of Mendota, California, and the deposits from which it originates are part of the Moreno Formation. After being excavated, UCMP 33912 was mounted for display, first at the Golden Gate International Exposition, then at the University of California Berkeley, where it remained until being put into storage in the 1960s.

In 1943, American paleontologist Samuel Paul Welles found that the specimen was notably different from other known plesiosaurs and declared it as the type specimen of a new genus and species which he named Hydrotherosaurus alexandrae. The generic name means "fisherman lizard", while the specific name honors Annie Montague Alexander, who has done plenty of research on the vertebrates of the western United States.

== Description ==
Size comparison

Hydrotherosaurus was a medium-sized plesiosaur, with an estimated body length of 7.8–8.8 metres (26–29 ft) long and body mass of around 1.9 metric tons (2.1 short tons). It has one of the longest necks relative to total length among elasmosaurids, with 60 vertebrae in total. It had a small head that measured about 33 centimetres (13 in; 1.08 ft) long, a streamlined body, and four large flippers that were specially designed to help the huge animal balance, move, and accelerate itself. Like other elasmosaurs, Hydrotherosaurus is thought to have been an active, fish-eating animal.

== Classification ==
The following cladogram shows the phylogenetic position of Hydrotherosaurus within Elasmosauridae:

- Elasmosauridae
  - - Callawayasaurus
    - Eromangasaurus
    - Wapuskanectes
    - Speeton Clay plesiosaur
  - Euelasmosaurida
    - Lagenanectes
    - - - Traskasaura
        - Nakonanectes
      - - - - Libonectes
            - - Jucha
              - Fluvionectes
          - - Thalassomedon
            - Styxosaurus
        - - Elasmosaurinae
            - Terminonatator
            - - Albertonectes
              - Elasmosaurus
          - - Zarafasaura
            - - Cardiocorax
              - Weddellonectia
                - Tuarangisaurus
                - - Futabasaurus
                  - - - Chubutinectes
                      - - Aphrosaurus
                        - Hydrotherosaurus
                    - - - Morenosaurus
                        - - Vegasaurus
                          - Kawanectes
                      - - Marambionectes
                        - Aristonectinae
                          - Wunyelfia
                          - - Aristonectes parvidens
                            - Aristonectes quiriquinensis
                            - Kaiwhekea
                            - MLP 99 XII 1 5
                            - - Alexandronectes
                              - Morturneria

== See also ==
- List of plesiosaur genera
- Timeline of plesiosaur research
