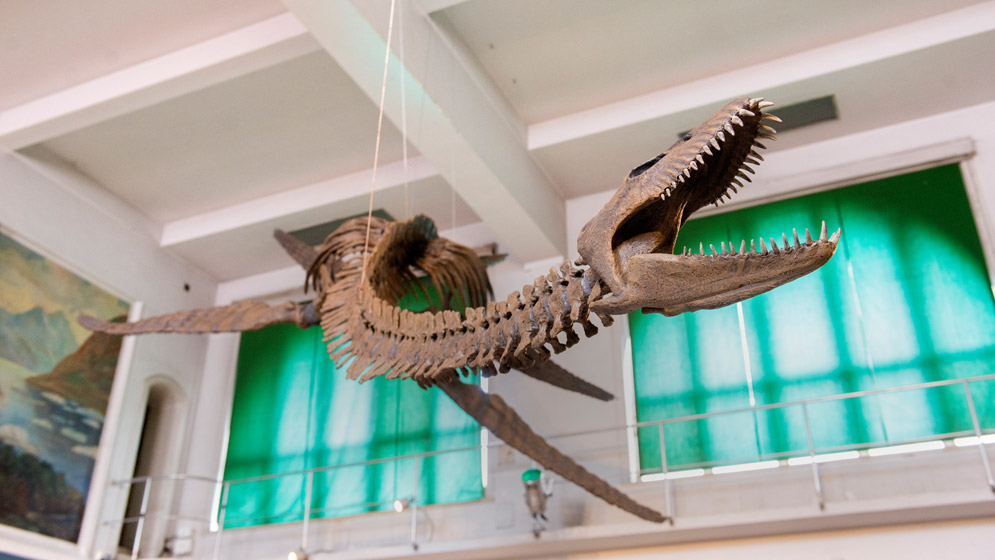
- Reconstructed skeleton

Scientific classification
- Kingdom: Animalia
- Phylum: Chordata
- Class: Reptilia
- Superorder: †Sauropterygia
- Order: †Plesiosauria
- Superfamily: †Plesiosauroidea
- Family: †Elasmosauridae
- Clade: †Weddellonectia
- Genus: †Argentinonectes; Novas et al., 2026
- Species: †A. calafatensis

Binomial name
- †Argentinonectes calafatensis Novas et al., 2026

= Argentinonectes =

Argentinonectes Temporal range: Late Cretaceous, late Maastrichtian

Genus of elasmosaurid plesiosaur

Argentinonectes (lit. 'Lake Argentino swimmer') is an extinct genus of elasmosaurid plesiosaur in the group Weddellonectia, known from the Late Cretaceous (Maastrichtian age) Calafate Formation of Argentina. The genus contains a single species, Argentinonectes calafatensis, named and described in 2026 based on a partial articulated skeleton that was discovered in 2009. This specimen was found under 50 cm (20 in) of water in Lake Argentino, which complicated its excavation. It includes most of the vertebral column, parts of the pectoral and pelvic girdles, one forelimb, and both hindlimbs, making it the most complete plesiosaur fossil known from Argentina. The articulated rib cage and gastralia indicate the torso would have been very rigid in life. Tooth scratches on some of the bones and tooth fossils found nearby indicate the carcass was scavenged by sharks before it was buried.

== Discovery and naming ==
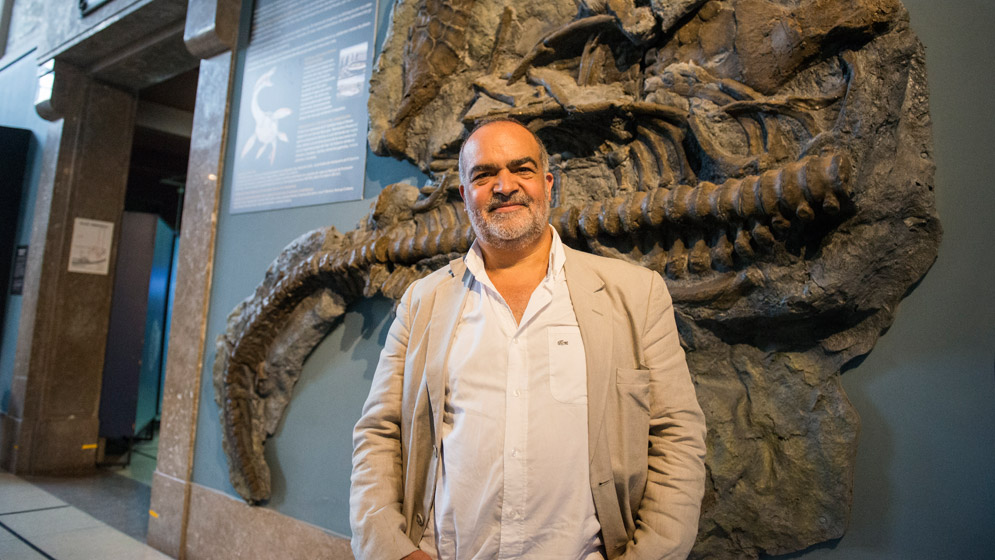
Fernando Novas standing in front of the A. calafatensis holotype

The excavation and study of the Argentinonectes fossil material was led by Argentine paleontologist Fernando Novas. He had been told of the specimen's existence by American paleontologist Kenneth Lacovara, who had heard that fossils were preserved on the southern shore of Argentino Lake in Santa Cruz Province, Argentina. After giving a lecture in El Calafate—a city at the southern edge of the lake—Novas inquired of local tour guides about the fossils, who brought him to the locality the following day. Part of the tail and a single flipper of a plesiosaur were visible around 50 centimetres (20 in) beneath the water's surface. In October 2009, Novas and a team of paleontologists returned to the site to excavate the fossil. A ring of sandbags had to be arranged around the skeleton, constantly being drained as it refilled with water. Once a block of stone containing the specimen was excavated, it was split into nine smaller pieces and transported ~2,800 kilometres (1,700 mi) north by truck to the Bernardino Rivadavia Natural Sciences Argentine Museum (MACM) in Buenos Aires for preparation. Here, it was reassembled, and excess rock was removed using rock-cutting machines. Over the course of nearly a decade, pneumatic tools, hammers, and chisels were used to meticulously expose the rest of the skeleton. It was CT scanned at the TCba Salguero Diagnostic Center, a medical facility in Buenos Aires, to better observe the internal structure of the bones.

In December 2018, the fully prepared specimen and a reconstructed version of the skeleton were presented at a year-end meeting of the Natural Sciences Argentine Museum, where Novas detailed the work put into its excavation, preparation, reconstruction, and preliminary study.

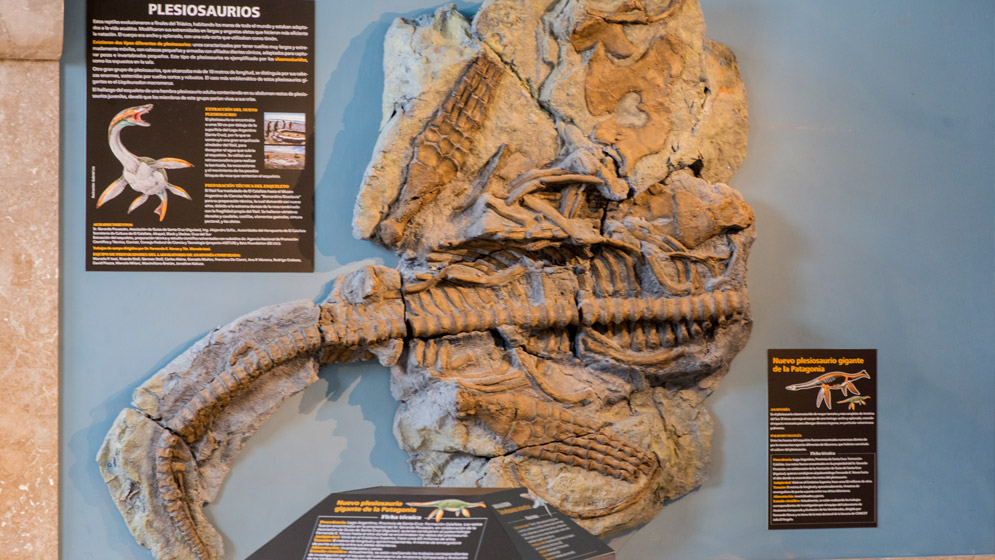
A. calafatensis holotype on display at the MACN in 2018

The specimen is now housed in the vertebrate paleontology collection of the Padre Manuel Jesús Molina Provincial Regional Museum in Santa Cruz, where it is accessioned as specimen MPM-PV 10.004 (or 1002). It consists of the postcranial part of an articulated skeleton, missing the skull, most of the neck, and one forelimb. The known material comprises much of the vertebral column (the last four cervical (neck) vertebrae, two pectoral vertebrae, 18 dorsal (trunk) vertebrae, three sacral vertebrae, and 28 caudal (tail) vertebrae), many articulated ribs, disarticulated gastralia, most of the pectoral girdle (both coracoids and the right scapula), part of the right ilium (a pelvic bone), almost all of the right forelimb, and both hindlimbs. Together, it represents the most complete plesiosaur skeleton discovered in Argentina.

Given the completeness of the preserved material, the reason for the absence of the skull and neck is unclear. This part of the skeleton may have been fossilized but later displaced and eroded by the waves of Argentino Lake. Alternatively, this individual may have undergone 'bloat-and-float' decomposition, where these parts were detached prior to the animal's burial. Shark teeth collected at the type locality and scratches on the coracoid suggest the animal was scavenged after its death.

In 2026, Fernando Novas and colleagues described Argentinonectes calafatensis as a new genus and species of plesiosaur based on these fossil remains, establishing MPM-PV 10.004 as the holotype specimen. The generic name, Argentinonectes, combines a reference to the discovery of the specimen in Argentino Lake with the Greek word nēktēs (a common plesiosaur name suffix), meaning 'swimmer'. The specific name, calafatensis, references the town of El Calafate, which is positioned about 20 kilometres (12 mi) southwest of the type locality.

== Description ==
=== Size ===
Argentinonectes is a large member of the plesiosaur clade Weddellonectia, with initial estimates of its body length placed at around 7–9 m (23–30 ft). The preserved forelimb is about 1.8 m (5.9 ft) long, while the hindlimbs are slightly shorter, at 1.3 m (4.3 ft). When reconstructed with the forelimbs articulated with the pectoral girdle, the maximum width between the flippers is about 5 m (16 ft).

The components of most of the dorsal and caudal vertebrae are firmly fused, both coracoids are fused at the midline, and the proximal (closer to the body) parts of the limbs are fully ossified, with well-defined facets and articular surfaces. These are indicators of osteological maturity, meaning the holotype individual was fully grown when it died.

=== Anatomy ===
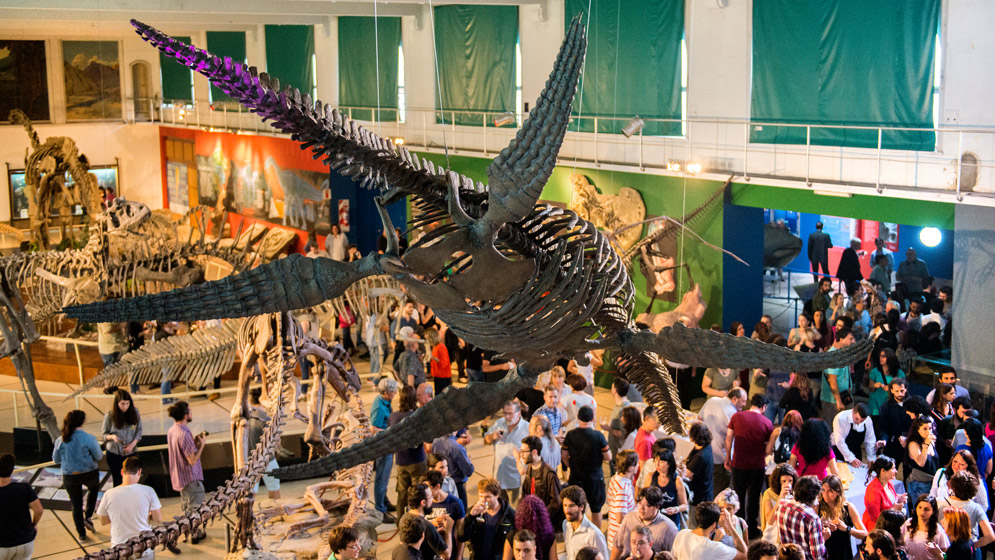
Underside of a reconstructed skeleton of Argentinonectes

Argentinonectes can be distinguished from other members of Weddellonectia by multiple autapomorphies (unique derived traits). These include the lateral (facing outward) margin of the coracoid being strongly concave and the posteromedial (facing back and inward) end of the coracoid being boot-shaped, contacting the opposite coracoid at the midline. A unique combination of other features of Argentinonectes that are not exclusive to it include the T-shaped cross-sections of the transverse processes on the dorsal vertebrae, an expansion on the inner surface of the base of the humerus for articulation with the ulna, a humerus with strong sigmoid curvature, and phalanges with a spool-like morphology that have expanded articular facets with a polygonal shape.

=== Respiration and locomotion ===
The ribs are recumbent in relation to the vertebral column, giving the animal a dorsoventrally flattened (from top to bottom) trunk region. The various gastral components were arranged rigidly, closely unified with the pectoral and pelvic girdles in a plastron-like structure, stiffening the torso. This would have prevented lung collapse while diving, and restricted lateral undulation when swimming. The costal ribs likely moved transversely for respiration, entirely decoupled from the movement of the flippers. As such, swimming and breathing could occur simultaneously without being reliant on each other. This contrasts with the condition for terrestrial tetrapods, in which limb movement is closely tied to costal respiration (expansion and contraction of the ribcage). This was likely the condition for most plesiosaurs, but the completeness and three-dimensional nature of the A. calafatensis holotype provides clearer evidence for it. The ribs and gastralia are pachyostotic (thickened with extra bone layers), a feature common in marine tetrapods that helps to maintain buoyancy. The distal (toward the end) tip of the tail is stiffened with strongly interlocked vertebrae, a feature presumably associated with the presence of a fleshy tail fin.

== Classification ==
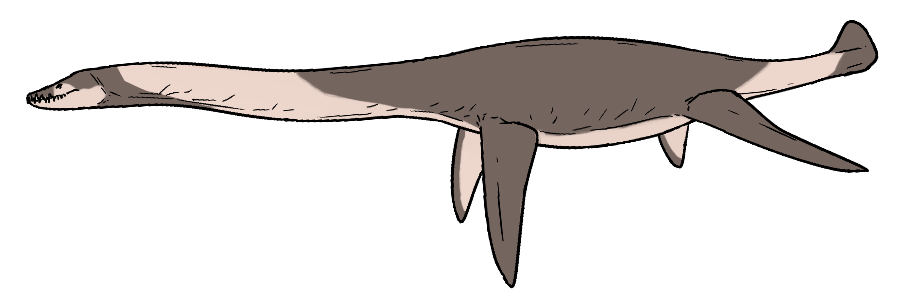
Life restoration of Kawanectes, a fellow weddellonectian plesiosaur

To test the affinities and relationships of Argentinonectes, Novas et al. (2026) included it in an updated version of the phylogenetic matrix of O'Gorman et al. (2024), which is one of several more recent interations of the dataset published by Benson and Druckenmiller (2014). The precise relationships (and the resolution thereof) of Argentinonectes depended on the analytical techniques used. Regardless, all iterations recovered it within the elasmosaurid plesiosaur clade Weddellonectia. Most versions placed it as the sister taxon to Chubutinectes, which is known from the similarly aged La Colonia Formation of Argentina.

Several anatomical features support a position outside of the weddellonectian subfamily Aristonectinae. These include the gracile humerus with a sigmoid-shaped shaft and non-anteriorly positioned head, compared to aristonectines, which have humeri with straight shafts and anteriorly positioned heads. Argentinonectes has 18–19 dorsal vertebrae, contrasting with the 24–25 seen in aristonectines. The results of the implied weighting analysis (k=6) conducted by Novas et al. (2026) are shown in the cladogram below:

- Weddellonectia
  - Tuarangisaurus keyesi
  - - Futabasaurus suzukii
    - - Aphrosaurus furlongi
      - - - Argentinonectes calafatensis
          - Chubutinectes carmeloi
        - - - Kawanectes lafquenianum
            - Vegasaurus molyi
          - - Marambionectes molinai
            - Aristonectinae
              - Aristonectes quiriquinensis
              - - Wunyelfia maulensis
                - - Kaiwhekea katiki
                  - - Aristonectes parvidens
                    - Morturneria seymourensis

== Paleobiology ==
Several isolated shark teeth were found in close association to the holotype of A. calafatensis. These could be assigned to the species Protosqualus argentinensis (a dogfish shark), Notidanodon (or Xampylodon) dentatus (a cow shark), and Echinorhinus maremagnum (an extinct species of Echinorhinus). Parallel scratches observed on the surface of the coracoid of Argentinonectes were likely made by these sharks, which shed some of their teeth as they scavenged the carcass.

== Paleoenvironment ==
Argentinonectes is known from the Calafate Formation, which dates to the upper Maastrichtian age of the late Cretaceous. While it is underlain by the Maastrichtian Chorrillo Formation, which preserves a more terrestrial fauna, the Calafate Formation represents a near-shore estuarine depositional environment. Non-vertebrate animal fossils from this formation include marine bivalves, gastropods and brachiopods.
