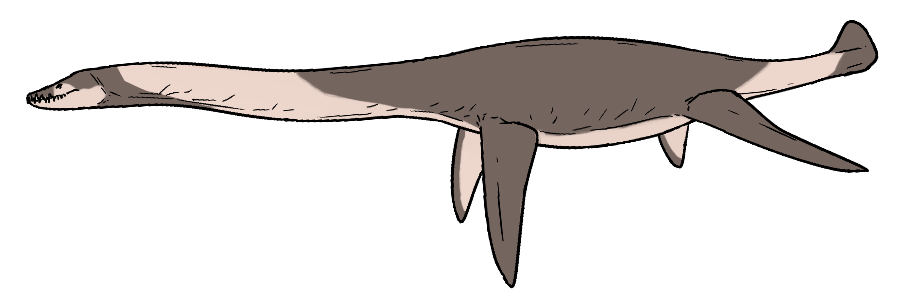
- Life restoration

Scientific classification
- Kingdom: Animalia
- Phylum: Chordata
- Class: Reptilia
- Superorder: †Sauropterygia
- Order: †Plesiosauria
- Superfamily: †Plesiosauroidea
- Family: †Elasmosauridae
- Genus: †Kawanectes; O'Gorman 2016
- Species: †K. lafquenianus

Binomial name
- †Kawanectes lafquenianus (Gasparini & Goñi 1985)

Synonyms
- Trinacromerum lafquenianum (Gasparini & Goñi 1985) (original name)

= Kawanectes =

Kawanectes Temporal range: Late Maastrichtian ~69–66 Ma

Extinct genus of reptiles

Kawanectes (meaning "Kawas swimmer") is an extinct genus of elasmosaurid plesiosaur, a type of long-necked marine reptile, that lived in the marginal marine, probably estuarine, environment of Late Cretaceous Patagonia. The genus contains a single species, Kawanectes lafquenianus, described in 2016 by José P. O'Gorman.

== Description ==
Size comparison

With a total adult body length measuring between 3.8–4.2 metres (12–14 ft), Kawanectes was small for an elasmosaurid. It belongs to the "non-elongated" group of elasmosaurids, meaning that its cervical vertebrae are not extremely lengthened, neither do they show great variability in length. The MCS specimen preserves 15 cervical vertebrae and 15 dorsal vertebrae, while the holotype preserves 10 caudal vertebrae; the true number of cervical and caudal vertebrae is unknown due to the incompleteness of the specimens.

A combination of autapomorphic traits can be used to distinguish Kawanectes from all other elasmosaurids: the centra of the vertebrae are wider than they are long; the projections known as the parapophyses on the caudal vertebrae are knob-like; the ischium and pubis form a "bar" of bone that encloses two diamond-shaped openings; the ratio between the length of the humerus and the femur is unusually high (1.2); the end of the humerus bears a backward projection of bone which forms an articulating surface; and the capitulum of the femur, which likewise forms an articulating surface, is strongly convex.

Although Kawanectes is similar to the somewhat-larger Vegasaurus, its bones clearly represent that of an adult due to the fusion in the vertebrae, the proportions of its cervical vertebrae are the same as Vegasaurus (if Vegasaurus was an older Kawanectes, its cervical vertebrae would be longer, as with other elasmosaurids), and Vegasaurus does not have a pelvic bar (since the pelvic bar is absent in juvenile elamosaurids but present in adults, the emergence then disappearance of the pelvic bar contradicts a hypothetical growth sequence), suggesting that Vegasaurus is not the adult form of Kawanectes. On the basis of three known specimens, it is proposed that the genus exhibits sexual dimorphism in terms of ilium shape, humerus to femur size ratio and sacral centrum proportions, and that females are larger than males.

== Discovery and naming ==
Kawanectes is known from the "Bentonitas Patagonicas" quarry in Rio Negro Province, Argentina. This quarry belongs to the Middle Member of the Allen Formation, which dates to the late Campanian to Early Maastrichtian of the Late Cretaceous. Three specimens were initially known: the holotype, MLP 71-II-13-1, which consists of various parts of the axial skeleton along with a femur, a humerus, an ilium, and a foot bone; MCS PV 4, which again consists of various axial bones in addition to a scapula, part of a coracoid, both sets of ischia and pubes, part of a foot, and 389 gastroliths; and MUC Pv 92, which also contains axial elements along with a femur, two foot bones, and fragments of the limb girdles. In 2020, another specimen was reported from the La Colonia Formation.

Initially recognized as a species of Trinacromerum, polycotylid affinities were later rejected for "T." lafquenianum. O'Gorman named the new monotypic genus Kawanectes for "T." lafquenianum in 2016. The name combines Kawa, which refers to the Kawas Sea, an ancient ocean that covered Patagonia from the Campanian to the Danian, and Greek nectes, which means "swimmer". The original specific name, lafquenianum, is the Mapuche word for "sea".

== Classification ==
In 2016, a phylogenetic analysis found that Kawanectes was a close relative to, but not a member of, the Aristonectinae.

- Elasmosauridae
  - Gronausaurus
  - - Speeton clay plesiosaur
    - - Wapuskanectes betsynicollsae
      - - Callawayasaurus colombiensis
        - - - Styxosaurus snowii
            - Futabasaurus suzukii
          - - - Albertonectes vanderveldei
              - Tuarangisaurus keyesi
              - Thalassomedon haningtoni
              - Elasmosaurus platyurus
            - - Terminonatator ponteixensis
              - - Hydrotherosaurus alexandrae
                - - Libonectes morgani
                  - - Kawanectes lafquenianus
                    - Vegasaurus molyi
                    - Morenosaurus stocki
                    - - Kaiwhekea katiki
                      - Aristonectes parvidens
                      - Aristonectes quiriquinensis

== Paleoecology ==
With the discovery of Kawanectes, the plesiosaurian fauna of the Kawas sea (which spans both the Allen Formation and the contemporary La Colonia Formation) contains all three major lineages of Late Cretaceous plesiosaurs: non-aristonectine elasmosaurids (Kawanectes and Chubutinectes), aristonectine elasmosaurids (Aristonectes), and polycotylids (Sulcusuchus). This is unusual, since these formations represent continental-to-marginal marine environments (i.e. not open ocean). These plesiosaurs appear to be generally smaller than their open-ocean counterparts at adult size.
