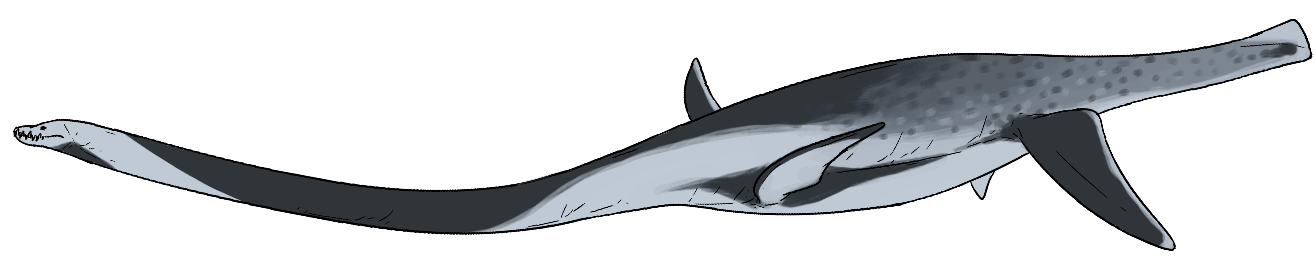
- Life restoration

Scientific classification
- Kingdom: Animalia
- Phylum: Chordata
- Class: Reptilia
- Superorder: †Sauropterygia
- Order: †Plesiosauria
- Superfamily: †Plesiosauroidea
- Family: †Elasmosauridae
- Genus: †Vegasaurus; O'Gorman et al., 2015

Type species
- †Vegasaurus molyi O'Gorman et al., 2015

= Vegasaurus =

Vegasaurus Temporal range: Late Cretaceous, 72 Ma

Extinct genus of reptiles

Vegasaurus is an extinct genus of elasmosaurid plesiosaur known from the Late Cretaceous (early Maastrichtian stage) Snow Hill Island Formation of Vega Island, Antarctic Peninsula. It contains a single species, Vegasaurus molyi.

== Discovery and naming ==
Vegasaurus is known solely from the holotype MLP 93-I-5-1, a nearly complete well preserved postcranial skeleton (lacking the tip of the tail) housed at the La Plata Museum in La Plata, Argentina. Elements include the whole neck with 54 complete cervical vertebrae, three pectoral vertebrae, 17 back vertebrae, three sacral vertebrae, the front and middle tail vertebrae, pectoral and pelvic girdles, forelimbs and hindlimbs, ribs, and 45 gastroliths associated with the dorsal region. MLP 93-I-5-1 was discovered in 1989, by Eduardo Olivero, Daniel Martinioni, Francisco Mussel and Jorge Lusky, at Cape Lamb of Vega Island at the edge of the Antarctic Peninsula of James Ross Archipelago (northernmost part of Antarctica). Excavations took places during three Antarctic summer expeditions in 1993, 1999 and 2005. MLP 93-I-5-1 was collected from an area of 3 square meters in a semi-articulated state, at locality "Assemblage 10", which belongs to the middle section of Cape Lamb Member of the Snow Hill Island Formation, dating to the early Maastrichtian stage of the Late Cretaceous, about 72 million years ago.

Vegasaurus was first described and named by José P. O'Gorman, Leonardo Salgado, Eduardo B. Olivero and Sergio A. Marenssi in 2015 and the type species is Vegasaurus molyi. The generic name is derived from Vega, in reference to the Vega Island where the holotype was found, and from Greek saurus, meaning "lizard", a common suffix for genus names of extinct reptile. The specific name honors the Argentine paleontological technician Juan Jose Moly, for participating in 17 Antarctic field trips and in the collection of the holotype.

== Description ==
Vegasaurus is unique among elasmosaurids in having 54 neck vertebrae. Callawayasaurus with a similar count of 56 lacks the dumbbell-shaped articular faces that are present on the vertebrae of Vegasaurus. Additional traits rarely seen in other elasmosaurid include: atlas-axis complex with a visible keel on its lower surface, a side ridge that is present on neck vertebrae 8 to about 42, a well developed notch on lower surface in neck vertebrae before the seventh but not in the last five vertebrae, a coracoid with projection from the middle of its lower surface, a femur with strongly convex capitulum (head), the lack of pectoral and pelvic bars, and a humerus with front facing knee and a strong expansion to the back ending in an accessory back facet (only shared by Morenosaurus and Kaiwhekea), among other traits. It has an estimated body length of 6.15–6.5 metres (20.2–21.3 ft) and body mass of 839 kilograms (1,850 lb).

== Classification ==
O'Gorman et al. (2015) tested the phylogenetic position of Vegasaurus using a modified version of the Kubo et al. (2012) data-set. In the resultant topology, Vegasaurus nests with three other Late Cretaceous South Pacific elasmosaurids, being Morenosaurus, and two species from the Weddell Sea region, the aristonectines Aristonectes and Kaiwhekea. Vegasaurus differs from the two members of Aristonectinae by having elongated neck vertebrae, yet links them to taxa from the other side of the Pacific, e.g. Futabasaurus from Japan. The cladogram below follows their results, showing only the relationships within Elasmosauridae.

- Elasmosauridae
  - Eromangasaurus australis
  - - - Tuarangisaurus keyesi
      - - Elasmosaurus platyurus
        - Libonectes morgani
    - - - Callawayasaurus colombiensis
        - "Libonectes" atlasense
      - - Hydralmosaurus serpentinus
        - - Hydrotherosaurus alexandrae
          - - - Aphrosaurus furlongi
              - - Terminonatator ponteixensis
                - Thalassomedon haningtoni
            - - Styxosaurus snowii
              - - - Albertonectes vanderveldei
                  - - Futabasaurus suzukii
                    - Mauisaurus haasti
                - - Wapuskanectes betsynichollsae
                  - - Morenosaurus stocki
                    - Vegasaurus molyi
                    - Aristonectinae
                      - Aristonectes parvidens
                      - Kaiwhekea katiki

== Palaeobiology ==
=== Palaeopathology ===
The V. molyi specimen MLP-PV 93-I-5-1 displays pathological bone callus located on the mid-proximal portion of a rib, indicative of a fracture. Misalignment of the portions of the fractured rib occurred as it was healing.
