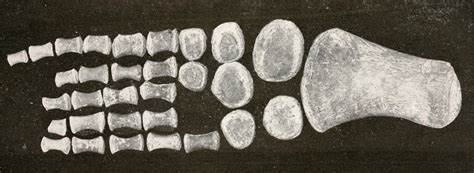
- Paddle bone of KUVP 441
- Cervical series of KUVP 441

Scientific classification
- Kingdom: Animalia
- Phylum: Chordata
- Class: Reptilia
- Superorder: †Sauropterygia
- Order: †Plesiosauria
- Superfamily: †Plesiosauroidea
- Family: †Elasmosauridae
- Genus: †Ogmodirus; Williston and Moodie, 1913
- Species: †O. martini

Binomial name
- †Ogmodirus martini Williston & Moodie, 1913

= Ogmodirus =

Ogmodirus Temporal range: Late Cretaceous, 94.3–89.3 Ma

Extinct genus of reptiles

Ogmodirus is an extinct genus of plesiosaur found in the Cenomanian-Turonian (Late Cretaceous) Greenhorn Limestone of Kansas. The type species, Ogmodirus martini, was named by Samuel Wendell Williston and Roy Lee Moodie in 1913.

== Discovery and naming ==
The holotype, KUVP 441, consists of a pelvic girdle, limb elements, and more than fifty cervical (neck) vertebrae from a juvenile discovered in Cloud County, Kansas by C. Boyce in 1909. KUVP 441 was named as Ogmodirus martini by Williston & Moodie (1913) and the specific name was emended to martinii by Moodie (1916), but the original name takes precedence. The holotype was described in detail by Williston & Moodie (1917).

A second species, Ogmodirus ischiadicus (based on specimen KUVP 434), was initially placed within its own genus, Thalassiosaurus, and has since been referred to Styxosaurus. It was placed in Ogmodirus by Williston & Moodie (1917).

== Classification ==
According to Welles (1962), Ogmodirus martini may be member of the Elasmosauridae, a group of marine animals related to Elasmosaurus, but the condition of the fossils discovered to date means the genus is dubious beyond Plesiosauria. Sepkoski (2002) assigned Ogmodirus to the Plesiosauria.

== See also ==
- List of plesiosaur genera
- Timeline of plesiosaur research
