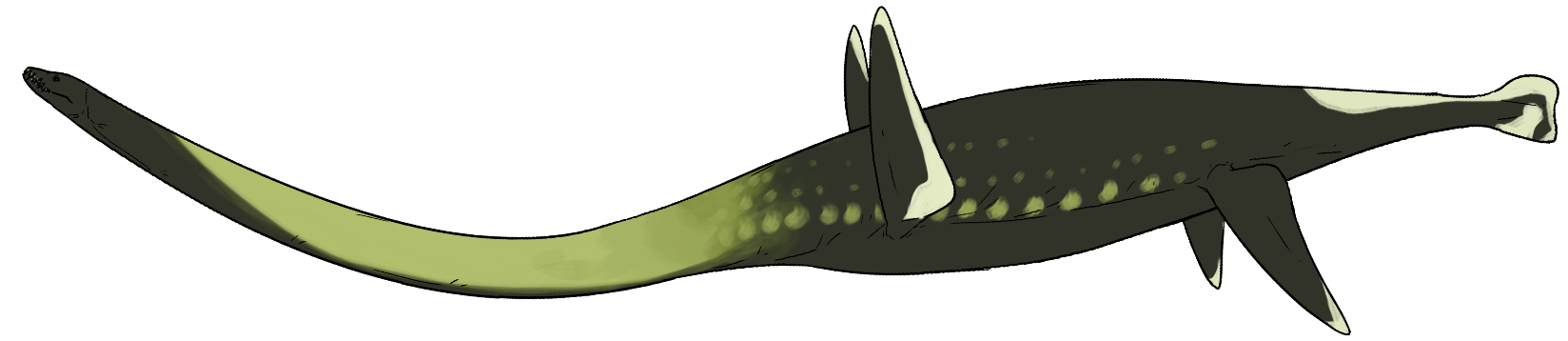
- Life restoration of T. keyesi

Scientific classification
- Kingdom: Animalia
- Phylum: Chordata
- Class: Reptilia
- Superorder: †Sauropterygia
- Order: †Plesiosauria
- Superfamily: †Plesiosauroidea
- Family: †Elasmosauridae
- Genus: †Tuarangisaurus; Wiffen, Wiffen & Moisley, 1986
- Species: †T. keyesi

Binomial name
- †Tuarangisaurus keyesi Wiffen, Wiffen & Moisley, 1986

= Tuarangisaurus =

Tuarangisaurus Temporal range: Late Cretaceous, 72–66 Ma

Extinct genus of reptiles

Tuarangisaurus (Māori: tuarangi "ancient" + Greek: σαῦρος, romanized: sauros "lizard") is an extinct genus of elasmosaurid known from New Zealand and Argentina. The type and only known species is Tuarangisaurus keyesi, named by "Pont" Wiffen, Joan Wiffen and Bill Moisley in 1986. The specific name honours Ian W. Keyes of the New Zealand Geological Survey.

== Discovery ==
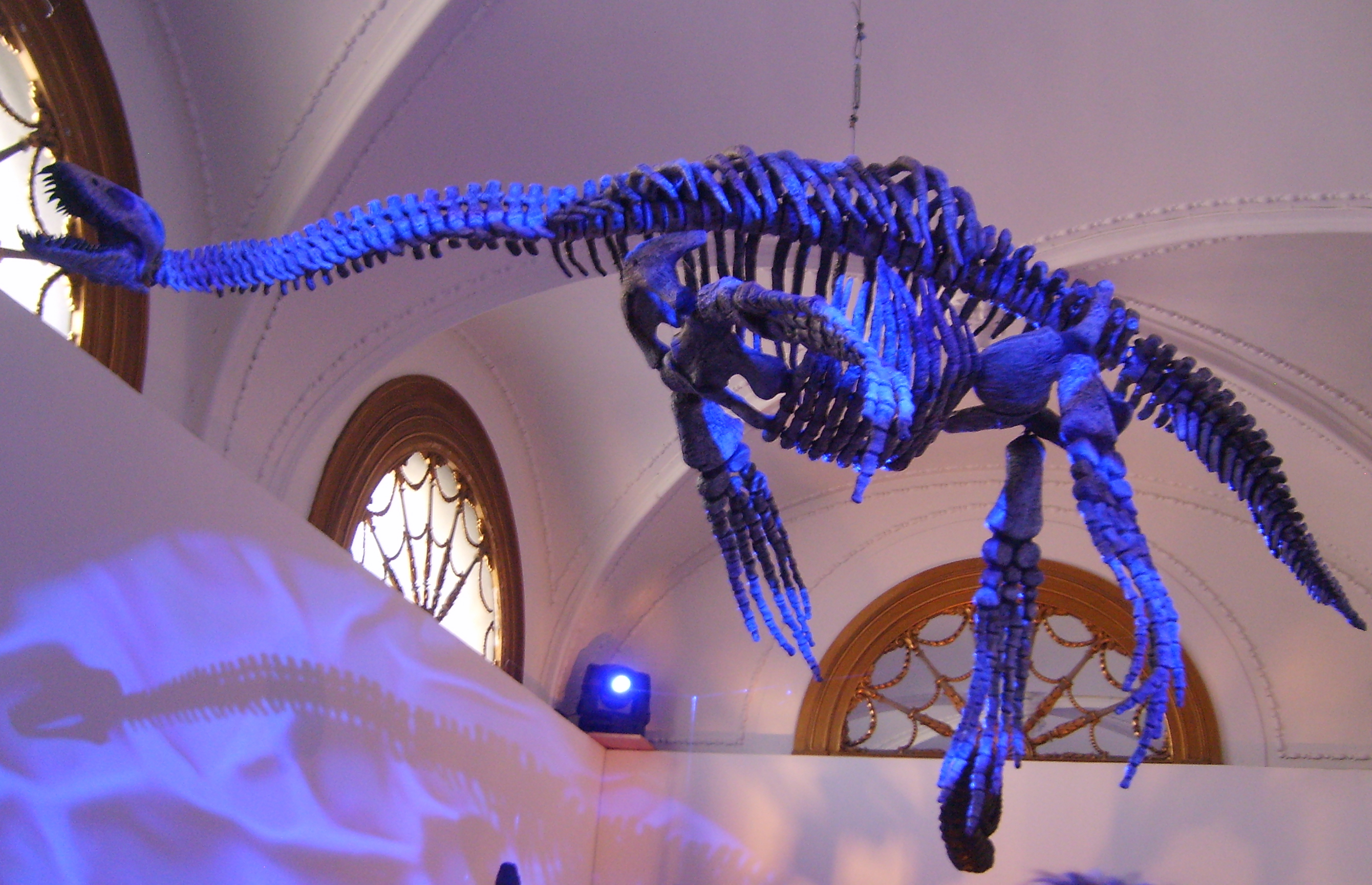
Restored skeleton of T. cabazai (now considered as an indeterminate aristonectine)

Tuarangisaurus is known from the holotype NZGS CD425, a nearly complete skull and mandible, and from NZGS CD426, rear skull elements and nine anterior-most cervical vertebrae from the same individual. Some postcranial remains of juveniles were also provisionally attributed to Tuarangisaurus, with one specimen (NZGS CD427) containing at least thirty gastroliths. It was on 20 March 1978 collected by amateur paleontologists from the Maungataniwha Sandstone Member of the Tahora Formation, dating to the upper Campanian to lower Maastrichtian stage of the Late Cretaceous.

A second species, T. australis, was named in 2005; however, it was moved to the genus Eromangasaurus in 2007, becoming the senior synonym of E. carinognathus. Another species, T.? cabazai, was collected during the early 2000s and was also placed in Tuarangisaurus by Gasparini, Salgado and Casadio in 2003; however, it was most recently reassigned to an indeterminate aristonectine.

In 2017, a complete specimen (CM Zfr 115), originally belonging to Mauisaurus, has been reassigned to this genus. In 2018, Otero and colleagues redescribed the juvenile specimen NZGS CD427 elucidating the ontogeny of this plesiosaur. The specimen had many features common with the holotype, but it differed in the orientation of the maxilla along with the number of teeth present in it. In 2026, O'Gorman, Scasso and Medina assigned an elasmosaurid specimen MPEF-PV 12001 from the Lefipán Formation of Argentina to T. keyesi.

== Description ==
Tuarangisaurus was a medium-sized plesiosaur, with a complete specimen (CM Zfr 115) measuring over 8 metres (26 ft) long. The preserved skull measured about 37.0 cm (1 ft 2.6 in) long, and its total skull length is estimated to have been 37.5 cm (1 ft 2.8 in) long. It can be distinguished from all other known elasmosaurids by a unique combination of characteristics as well as two otherwise unknown traits: the ectopterygoid has a long process directed towards the back, and a large boss of bone underneath. A stapes is present in the holotype; this bone was previously thought to be absent from elasmosaurids.

== Classification ==
Tuarangisaurus was initially assigned to the Elasmosauridae; one study found it to be a close relative of Callawayasaurus. A phylogenetic analysis of plesiosaurs run by O'Gorman and colleagues in 2016 reaffirmed that Tuarangisaurus was an elasmosaurid, but rejected a close relationship with Callawayasaurus. Its position within the Elasmosauridae according to this analysis is shown below.

- Elasmosauridae
  - Gronausaurus
  - - Speeton clay plesiosaur
    - - Wapuskanectes betsynicollsae
      - - Callawayasaurus colombiensis
        - - - Styxosaurus snowii
            - Futabasaurus suzukii
          - - - Albertonectes vanderveldei
              - Tuarangisaurus keyesi
              - Thalassomedon haningtoni
              - Elasmosaurus platyurus
            - - Terminonatator ponteixensis
              - - Hydrotherosaurus alexandrae
                - - Libonectes morgani
                  - - Kawanectes lafquenianum
                    - Vegasaurus molyi
                    - Morenosaurus stocki
                    - - Kaiwhekea katiki
                      - Aristonectes parvidens
                      - Aristonectes quiriquinensis

== See also ==
- List of plesiosaur genera
- Timeline of plesiosaur research
