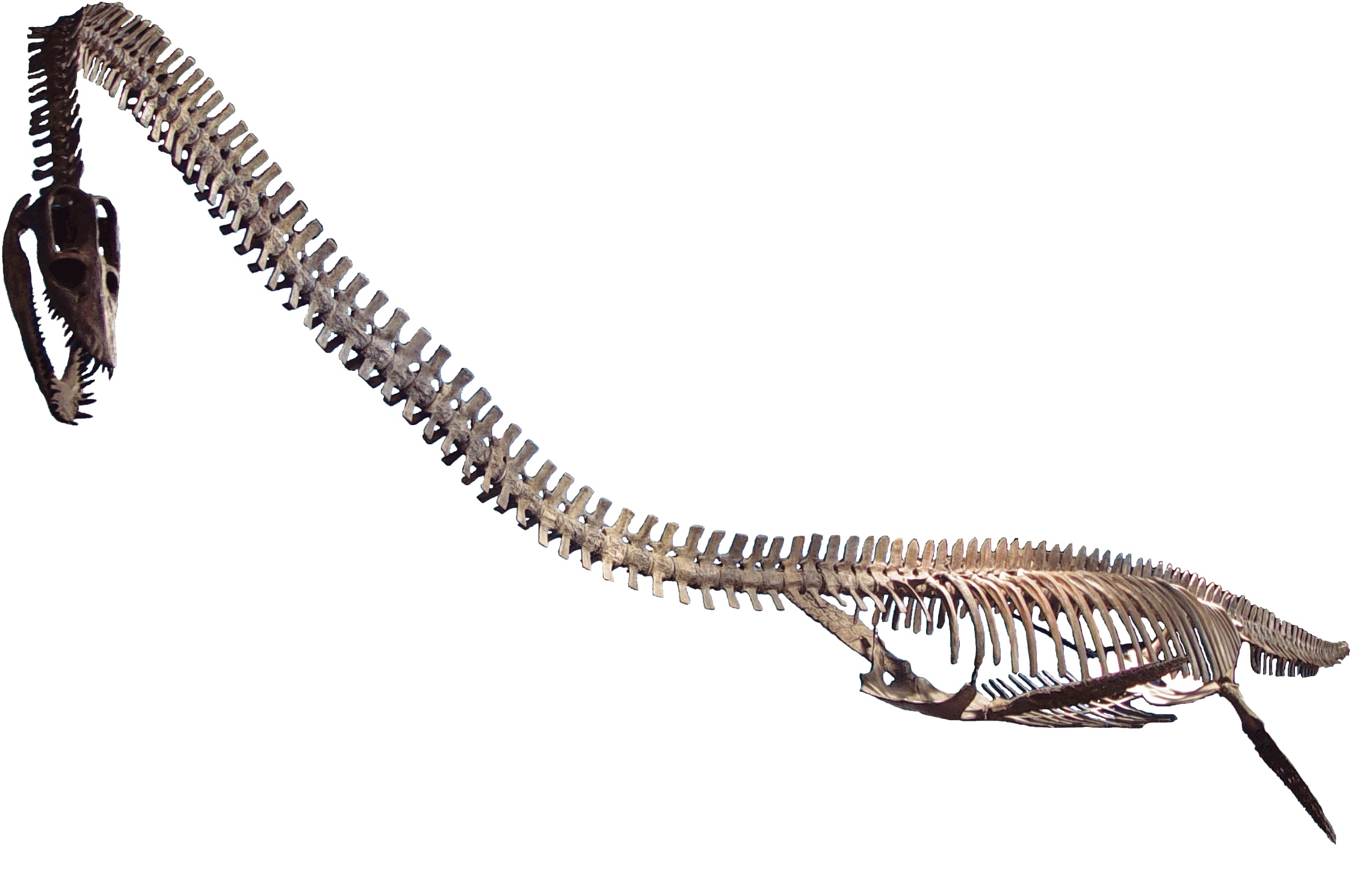
- Reconstructed skeleton of Elasmosaurus platyurus in the Rocky Mountain Dinosaur Resource Center in Woodland Park, Colorado.

Scientific classification
- Kingdom: Animalia
- Phylum: Chordata
- Class: Reptilia
- Superorder: †Sauropterygia
- Order: †Plesiosauria
- Superfamily: †Plesiosauroidea
- Clade: †Xenopsaria
- Family: †Elasmosauridae; Cope, 1869

Genera
- List: †Alexeyisaurus?; †Callawayasaurus; †Cimoliasaurus; †Eromangasaurus; †Fresnosaurus; †Jucha; †Lagenanectes; †Leurospondylus?; †Mauisaurus; †Ogmodirus; †Plesioelasmosaurus; †Scanisaurus; †Traskasaura; †Wapuskanectes; †Woolungasaurus; †Zarafasaura; †Euelasmosaurida; †Cardiocorax; †Libonectes; †Thalassomedon; †Elasmosaurinae; †Albertonectes; †Elasmosaurus; †Fluvionectes; †Hydrotherosaurus; †Nakonanectes; †Styxosaurus; †Terminonatator; †Weddellonectia; †Aphrosaurus; †Argentinonectes; †Chubutinectes; †Futabasaurus; †Kawanectes; †Marambionectes; †Morenosaurus; †Tuarangisaurus; †Vegasaurus; †Aristonectinae; †Alexandronectes; †Aristonectes; †Kaiwhekea; †Morturneria; †Wunyelfia

Synonyms
- Cimoliasauridae Delair, 1959

= Elasmosauridae =

Elasmosauridae Temporal range: Hauterivian-Maastrichtian, 130–66.0 Ma

Extinct family of reptiles

Elasmosauridae, often called elasmosaurs or elasmosaurids, is an extinct family of plesiosaurs that lived from the Hauterivian stage of the Early Cretaceous to the Maastrichtian stage of the Late Cretaceous period (c. 130 to 66 mya). The taxon was initially erected in 1869 by Edward Drinker Cope to include the type genus Elasmosaurus with the related Cimoliasaurus, although he did not argue in detail why. Over the following years, many authors recognized this classification on the basis of predominantly postcranial features, becoming one of the three groups in which plesiosaurs were often classified during the 19th century, along with the Pliosauridae and the Plesiosauridae. However, most of these traits led to many genera since recognized as belonging to other plesiosaur families being classified as elasmosaurids. Another family historically considered as distinct, the Cimoliasauridae, has since 2009 been recognized as a junior synonym of the Elasmosauridae. Along with the Polycotylidae, elasmosaurids represent the few plesiosauroids that lived until the Cretaceous–Paleogene extinction event.

With a maximum length ranging from 4 to 12 m (13 to 39 ft) depending on the genera, elasmosaurids have a streamlined body with paddle-like limbs, mostly having a short tail, a small head, and an extremely long neck. The necks of these marine reptiles are supported by a very large number of cervical vertebrae, Elasmosaurus and Albertonectes being the only known vertebrates to have more than 70. The skull of elasmosaurids appears mainly slender and triangular, the majority of them having large fang-like teeth at the front, and smaller teeth towards the back. The Aristonectinae subgroup nevertheless has different morphological traits, having more numerous but smaller teeth and having a shorter neck. Elasmosaurids were well adapted for aquatic life, and used their flippers for swimming. Contrary to earlier depictions, their necks were not very flexible, and could not be held high above the water surface. It is unknown what their long necks were used for, but they may have had a function in feeding. Elasmosaurids probably ate small fish and marine invertebrates, seizing them with their long teeth, and may have used gastroliths (stomach stones) to help digest their food.

== Morphology ==
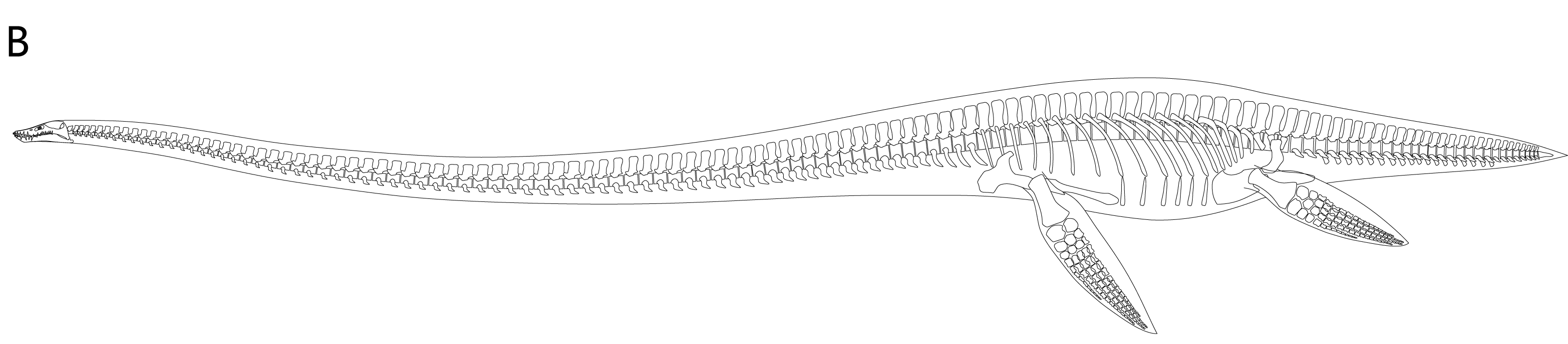
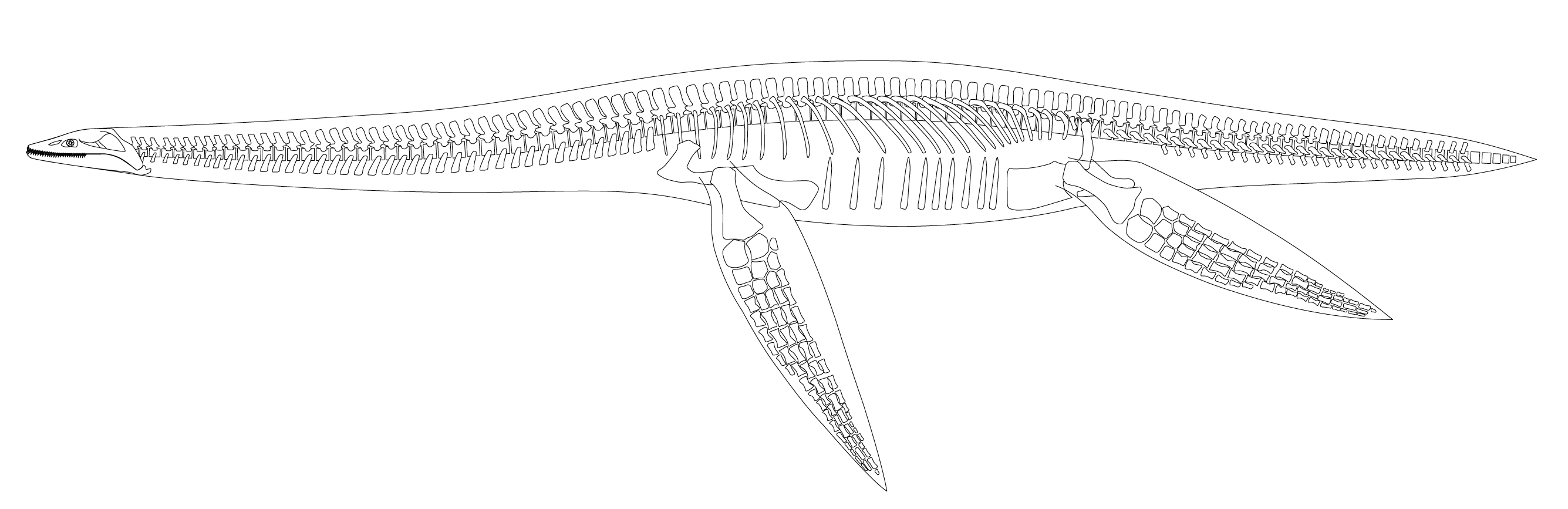
Skeletal reconstructions of Albertonectes (top) and Aristonectes (bottom). The first represents the "typical" morphology of elasmosaurids, while the second represents the slightly different morphology of the aristonectines.

Like many plesiosaurs, elasmosaurids are easily recognizable by their compact, streamlined bodies, long paddle-like limbs, short tails, proportionately small heads, and very elongated necks. Most representatives adopt sizes ranging from more than 8 m (26 ft) in length. The largest known member of this family, Albertonectes, would have reached a length of 12.1 metres (40 ft) with a body mass of 3.1 metric tons (3.4 short tons). A referred specimen of Aristonectes that was discovered in Seymour Island, Antarctica, is view to be one of the largest and heaviest plesiosaurs identified to date, estimated in a 2019 study at between 11 and 11.9 metres (36 and 39 ft) long for body mass of 10.7–13.5 metric tons (11.8–14.9 short tons). (Note: The body mass estimate of the 2019 study is based on authors' assumption that Cryptoclidus and Aristonectes would have had similar body proportions.) One of the smallest known elasmosaurids, Kawanectes, reached a length of 3.8–4.2 metres (12–14 ft) in adulthood.

The skull of elasmosaurids are mainly slender and triangular in shape. The lateral edges of the orbits are characterized by a convex lateral edge. A large majority of representatives of the group have a their generally heterodont (irregular throughout the jaws) dentition, with the teeth becoming progressively smaller from front to back, with the larger ones shaped like large fangs. These representatives have generally five teeth in the premaxillae (which form the front of the upper jaw), 14 teeth in the maxillae (the largest tooth bearing bone of the upper jaw), and between 17 and 19 in the dentary bones (the main part of the lower jaw). The tooth crowns are all slender and possess an oval to subcircular cross-section. Their surfaces are generally ornamented with fine longitudinal ridges extending from the base to the apex of the crown. The roots are cylindrical in shape and commonly exhibit resorption scars associated with the continuous replacement of the teeth. Aristonectines teeth are more numerous but are considerably smaller, having a homodont dentition, all the teeth being similar in shape.

One of the most easily recognizable characteristics of elasmosaurids is their long neck formed by a fairly considerable number of cervical vertebrae, of which a large majority of genera have between 50 and 70. The type genus Elasmosaurus and its close relative Albertonectes are the only representatives currently known to have more than 70, an unequaled number among all known vertebrates. In spite of their many neck vertebrae, the necks of elasmosaurids were less than half as long as those of the longest-necked sauropod dinosaurs. Additionally, the Aristonectinae subgroup has cervical vertebrae that are wider than they are long, and their necks are therefore shorter than those of other representatives. Apart from aristonectines, other elasmosaurids have a longitudinal ridge on the cervical vertebrae which served to anchor the neck musculature. One of the identifying features of elasmosaurids is that their shoulder girdle has a large heart-shaped opening located between the coracoids, known as the intercoracoid embayment. As with other plesiosaurs, they have swimming paddles made up of very long digits. The paddles at the front (the pectoral paddles) were longer than those at the back (the pelvic paddles). Since the last tail-vertebrae of elasmosaurids were fused into a structure similar to the pygostyle of birds, it is possible this supported a tail-fin, but the shape it would have had is unknown.

== Classification ==
=== Early three-family classification ===
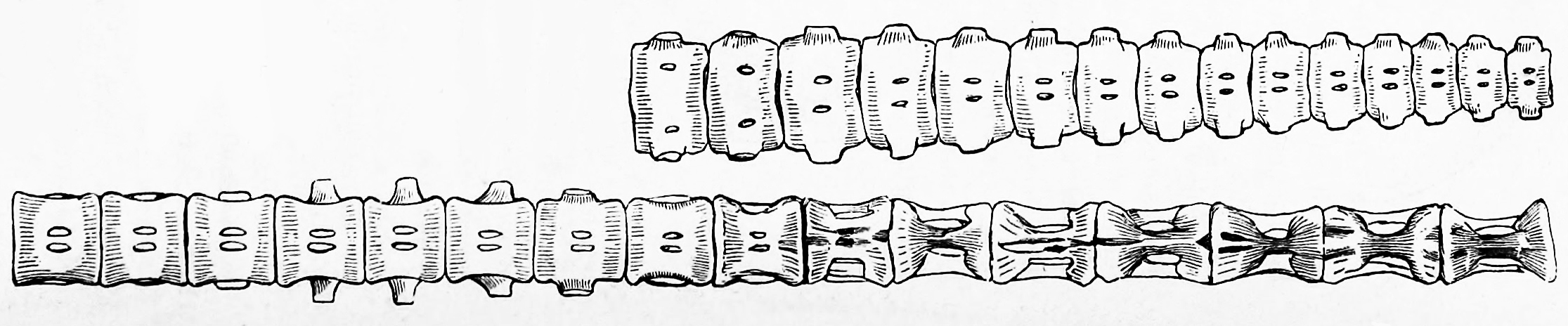
Neck and back vertebrae of Cimoliasaurus, above, and Elasmosaurus, figured by Cope, 1869

Though Edward Drinker Cope had originally recognized Elasmosaurus as a plesiosaur, in an 1869 paper he placed it, with Cimoliasaurus and Crymocetus, in a new order of sauropterygian reptiles. He named the group Streptosauria, or "reversed lizards", due to the orientation of their individual vertebrae supposedly being reversed compared to what is seen in other vertebrate animals. He subsequently abandoned this idea in his 1869 description of Elasmosaurus, where he stated he had based it on Joseph Leidy's erroneous interpretation of Cimoliasaurus. In this paper, he also named the new family Elasmosauridae, containing Elasmosaurus and Cimoliasaurus, without comment. Within this family, he considered the former to be distinguished by a longer neck with compressed vertebrae, and the latter by a shorter neck with square, depressed vertebrae.

In subsequent years, Elasmosauridae came to be one of three groups in which plesiosaurs were classified, the others being the Pliosauridae and Plesiosauridae (sometimes merged into one group). In 1874 Harry Seeley took issue with Cope's identification of clavicles in the shoulder girdle of Elasmosaurus, asserting that the supposed clavicles were actually scapulae. He found no evidence of a clavicle or an interclavicle in the shoulder girdle of Elasmosaurus; he noted that the absence of the latter bone was also seen in a number of other plesiosaur specimens, which he named as new elasmosaurid genera: Eretmosaurus, Colymbosaurus, and Muraenosaurus. Richard Lydekker subsequently proposed that Elasmosaurus, Polycotylus, Colymbosaurus, and Muraenosaurus could not be distinguished from Cimoliasaurus based on their shoulder girdles, and advocated their synonymization at the genus level.

Seeley noted in 1892 that the clavicle was fused to the coracoid by a suture in elasmosaurians, and was apparently "an inseparable part" of the scapula. Meanwhile, all plesiosaurs with two-headed neck ribs (the Plesiosauridae and Pliosauridae) had a clavicle made only of cartilage, such that ossification of the clavicle would turn a "plesiosaurian" into an "elasmosaurian". Samuel Wendell Williston doubted Seeley's usage of neck ribs to subdivide plesiosaurs in 1907, opining that double-headed neck ribs were instead a "primitive character confined to the early forms". Charles Andrews elaborated on differences between elasmosaurids and pliosaurids in 1910 and 1913. He characterized elasmosaurids by their long necks and small heads, as well as by their rigid and well-developed scapulae (but atrophied or absent clavicles and interclavicles) for forelimb-driven locomotion. Meanwhile, pliosaurids had short necks but large heads, and used hindlimb-driven locomotion.

=== Refinement of plesiosaur taxonomy ===
Although the placement of Elasmosaurus in the Elasmosauridae remained uncontroversial, opinions on the relationships of the family became variable over subsequent decades. Williston created a revised taxonomy of plesiosaurs in a monograph on the osteology of reptiles (published posthumously in 1925). He provided a revised diagnosis of the Elasmosauridae; aside from the small head and long neck, he characterized elasmosaurids by their single-headed ribs; scapulae that meet at the midline; clavicles that are not separated by a gap; coracoids that are "broadly separated" in their rear half; short ischia; and the presence of only two bones (the typical condition) in the epipodialia (the "forearms" and "shins" of the flippers). He also removed several plesiosaurs previously considered to be elasmosaurids from this family due to their shorter necks and continuously meeting coracoids; these included Polycotylus and Trinacromerum (the Polycotylidae), as well as Muraenosaurus, Cryptoclidus, Picrocleidus, Tricleidus, and others (the Cryptoclididae).

In 1940 Theodore White published a hypothesis on the interrelationships between different plesiosaurian families. He considered Elasmosauridae to be closest to the Pliosauridae, noting their relatively narrow coracoids as well as their lack of interclavicles or clavicles. His diagnosis of the Elasmosauridae also noted the moderate length of the skull (i.e., a mesocephalic skull); the neck ribs having one or two heads; the scapula and coracoid contacting at the midline; the blunted rear outer angle of the coracoid; and the pair of openings (fenestrae) in the scapula–coracoid complex being separated by a narrower bar of bone compared to pliosaurids. The cited variability in the number of heads on the neck ribs arises from his inclusion of Simolestes to the Elasmosauridae, since the characteristics of "both the skull and shoulder girdle compare more favorably with Elasmosaurus than with Pliosaurus or Peloneustes." He considered Simolestes a possible ancestor of Elasmosaurus. Oskar Kuhn adopted a similar classification in 1961.

Samuel Paul Welles took issue with White's classification in his 1943 revision of plesiosaurs, noting that White's characteristics are influenced by both preservation and ontogeny. He divided plesiosaurs into two superfamilies, the Plesiosauroidea and Pliosauroidea, based on neck length, head size, ischium length, and the slenderness of the humerus and femur (the propodialia). Each superfamily was further subdivided by the number of heads on the ribs, and the proportions of the epipodialia. Thus, elasmosaurids had long necks, small heads, short ischia, stocky propodialia, single-headed ribs, and short epipodialia. Pierre de Saint-Seine in 1955 and Alfred Romer in 1956 both adopted Welles' classification. In 1962 Welles further subdivided elasmosaurids based on whether they possessed pelvic bars formed from the fusion of the ischia, with Elasmosaurus and Brancasaurus being united in the subfamily Elasmosaurinae by their sharing of completely closed pelvic bars.

Per Ove Persson, however, considered Welles' classification too simplistic, noting in 1963 that it would, in his opinion, erroneously assign Cryptoclidus, Muraenosaurus, Picrocleidus, and Tricleidus to the Elasmosauridae. Persson refined the Elasmosauridae to include traits such as the crests on the sides of the neck vertebrae; the hatchet-shaped neck ribs at the front of the neck; the fused clavicles; the separation of the coracoids at the rear; and the rounded, plate-like pubis. He also retained the Cimoliasauridae as separate from the Elasmosauridae, and suggested, based on comparisons of vertebral lengths, that they diverged from the Plesiosauridae in the Late Jurassic or Early Cretaceous. However, David S. Brown noted in 1981 that the variability of neck length in plesiosaurs made Persson's argument unfeasible, and moved the aforementioned genera back into the Elasmosauridae; he similarly criticized Welles' subdivision of elasmosaurids based on the pelvic bar. Brown's diagnosis of elasmosaurids included the presence of five premaxillary teeth; the ornamentation of teeth by longitudinal ridges; the presence of grooves surrounding the occipital condyles; and the broad-bodied scapulae meeting at the midline. In 2009, F. Robin O'Keefe and Hallie Street synonymized the Cimoliasauridae with the Elasmosauridae, noting that most of the diagnostic traits previously established to distinguish them are also found in elasmosaurids.

=== Modern phylogenetic context ===
Kenneth Carpenter's 1997 phylogenetic analysis of plesiosaurs challenged the traditional subdivision of plesiosaurs based on neck length. He found that Libonectes and Dolichorhynchops shared characteristics such as an opening on the palate for the vomeronasal organ, the plate-like expansions of the pterygoid bones, and the loss of the pineal foramen on the top of the skull, differing from the pliosaurs. While polycotylids had previously been part of the Pliosauroidea, Carpenter moved polycotylids to become the sister group of the elasmosaurids based on these similarities, thus implying that polycotylids and pliosauroids evolved their short necks independently.

O'Keefe likewise included polycotylids in the Plesiosauroidea in 2001 and 2004, but considered them more closely related to the Cimoliasauridae and Cryptoclididae in the Cryptocleidoidea. Some analyses continued to recover the traditional groupings. In 2008 Patrick Druckenmiller and Anthony Russell moved the Polycotylidae back into the Pliosauroidea, and placed Leptocleidus as their sister group in the newly named Leptocleidoidea; Adam Smith and Gareth Dyke independently found the same result in the same year. However, in 2010 Hilary Ketchum and Roger Benson concluded that the results of these analyses were influenced by inadequate sampling of species. In the most comprehensive phylogeny of plesiosaurs yet, they moved the Leptocleidoidea (renamed the Leptocleidia) back into the Plesiosauroidea as the sister group of the Elasmosauridae; subsequent analyses by Benson and Druckenmiller recovered similar results, and named the Leptocleidoidea–Elasmosauridae grouping as Xenopsaria.

The content of Elasmosauridae also received greater scrutiny. Since its initial assignment to the Elasmosauridae, the relationships of Brancasaurus had been considered well supported, and it was recovered by O'Keefe's 2004 analysis and Franziska Großmann's 2007 analysis. However, Ketchum and Benson's analysis instead included it in the Leptocleidia, and its inclusion in that group has remained consistent in subsequent analyses. Their analysis also moved Muraenosaurus to the Cryptoclididae, and Microcleidus and Occitanosaurus to the Plesiosauridae; Benson and Druckenmiller isolated the latter two in the group Microcleididae in 2014, and considered Occitanosaurus a species of Microcleidus. These genera had all previously been considered to be elasmosaurids by Carpenter, Großmann, and other researchers.

Within the Elasmosauridae, Elasmosaurus itself has been considered a "wildcard taxon" with highly variable relationships. Carpenter's 1999 analysis suggested that Elasmosaurus was more basal (i.e. less specialized) than other elasmosaurids with the exception of Libonectes. In 2005 Sachs suggested that Elasmosaurus was closely related to Styxosaurus, and in 2008 Druckenmiller and Russell placed it as part of a polytomy with two groups, one containing Libonectes and Terminonatator, the other containing Callawayasaurus and Hydrotherosaurus. Ketchum and Benson's 2010 analysis included Elasmosaurus in the former group. Benson and Druckenmiller's 2013 analysis (below, left) further removed Terminonatator from this group and placed it as one step more derived (i.e., more specialized). In Rodrigo Otero's 2016 analysis based on a modification of the same dataset (below, right), Elamosaurus was the closest relative of Albertonectes, forming the Styxosaurinae with Styxosaurus and Terminonatator. Danielle Serratos, Druckenmiller, and Benson could not resolve the position of Elasmosaurus in 2017, but they noted that Styxosaurinae would be a synonym of Elasmosaurinae if Elasmosaurus did fall within the group. In 2020, O'Gorman formally synonymized Styxosaurinae with Elasmosaurinae based on the inclusion of Elasmosaurus within the group, and also provided a list of diagnostic characteristics for the clade. In 2021 a new topology placed Cardiocorax as a sister taxon of Libonectes, representing an older lineage of elasmosaurids in the Maastrichtian.

Topology A: Benson et al. (2013)

- - - Cryptoclididae
    - Leptocleidia
      - Leptocleididae
      - Polycotylidae
  - Elasmosauridae
    - Thalassomedon
    - - - Libonectes
        - Elasmosaurus
      - - Terminonatator
        - - - Styxosaurus
            - Hydrotherosaurus
          - - Callawayasaurus
            - - Eromangasaurus
              - - Kaiwhekea
                - Aristonectes

Topology B: Otero (2016), with clade names following O'Gorman (2020)

- Cryptoclidia
  - Cryptoclididae
  - Xenopsaria
    - Leptocleidia
      - Leptocleididae
      - Polycotylidae
    - Elasmosauridae
      - Eromangasaurus
      - - Callawayasaurus
        - - Libonectes
          - - - Tuarangisaurus
              - Thalassomedon
            - - Specimen CM Zfr 115
              - - Hydrotherosaurus
                - Futabasaurus
            - - Aristonectinae
                - Kaiwhekea
                - - Alexandronectes
                  - - Morturneria
                    - Aristonectes
              - Elasmosaurinae
                - Terminonatator
                - - - Elasmosaurus
                    - Albertonectes
                  - Styxosaurus

== Paleobiology ==
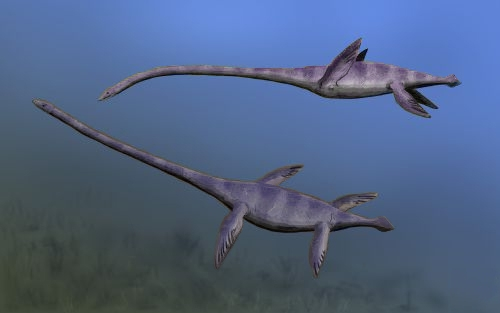
Restoration showing two Elasmosaurus swimming with straight necks

Elasmosaurids were fully adapted to life in the ocean, with streamlined bodies and long paddles that indicate they were active swimmers. The unusual body structure of elasmosaurids would have limited the speed at which they could swim, and their paddles may have moved in a manner similar to the movement of oars rowing, and due to this, could not twist and were thus held rigidly. Plesiosaurs were even believed to have been able to maintain a constant and high body temperature (homeothermy), allowing for sustained swimming.

A 2015 study concluded that locomotion was mostly done by the fore-flippers while the hind-flippers functioned in maneuverability and stability; a 2017 study concluded that the hind-flippers of plesiosaurs produced 60% more thrust and had 40% more efficiency when moving in harmony with the fore-flippers. The paddles of plesiosaurs were so rigid and specialized for swimming that they could not have come on land to lay eggs like sea turtles. Therefore, they probably gave live-birth (viviparity) to their young like some species of sea snakes. Evidence for live-birth in plesiosaurs is provided by the fossil of an adult Polycotylus with a single fetus inside.

Elasmosaurid remains provide some evidence they were preyed upon. A humerus of an unidentified subadult elasmosaurid was found with bite marks matching the teeth of the shark Cretoxyrhina, while a crushed Eromangasaurus skull has tooth-marks matched to the pliosaur Kronosaurus.

=== Neck movement and function ===
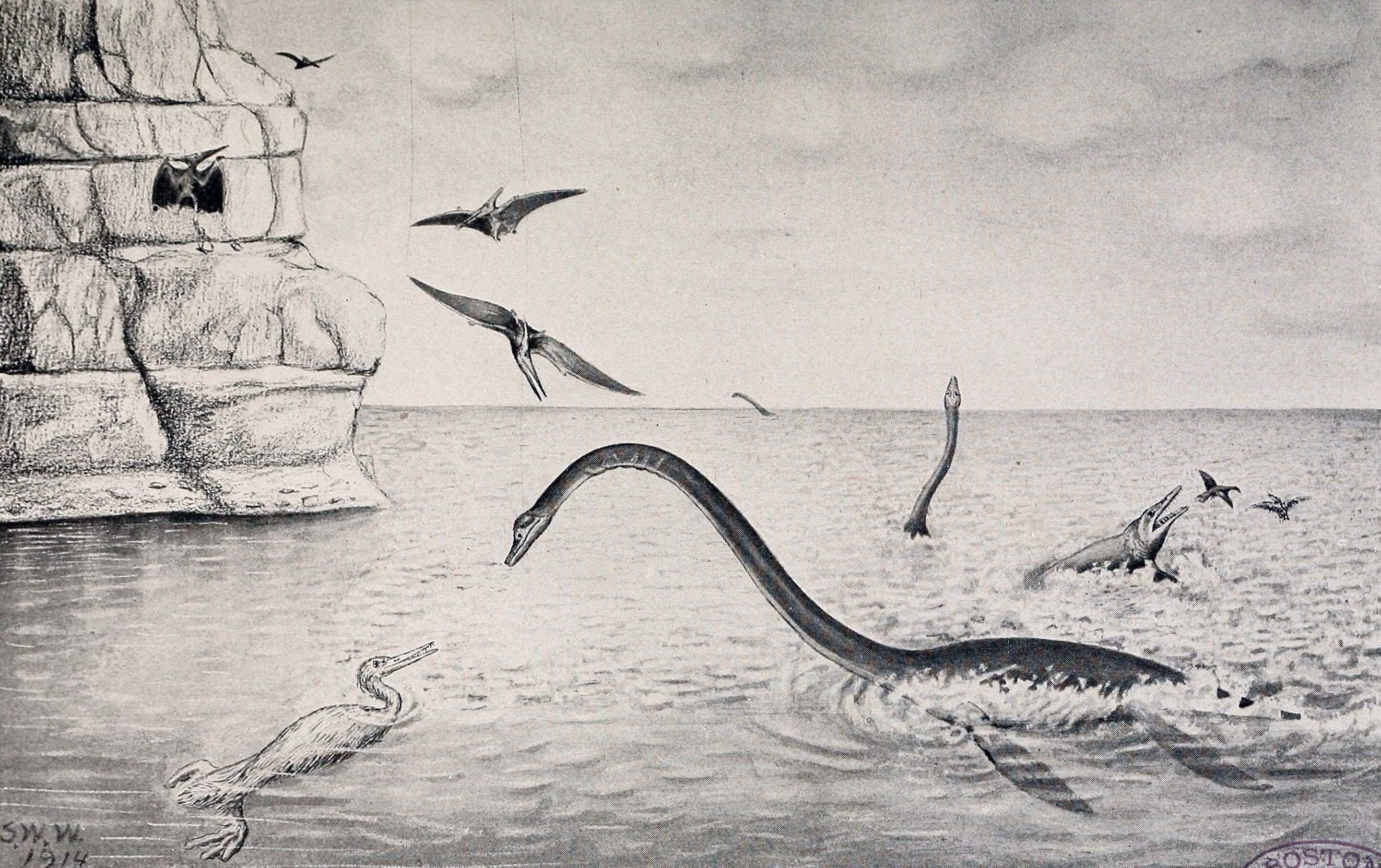
Outdated restoration of Elasmosaurus showing its neck raised above water, by Samuel Wendell Williston, 1914

Cope, in 1869, compared the build and habits of Elasmosaurus with those of a snake. Although he suggested that the vertebral column of the trunk did not allow for much vertical movement due to the elongated neural spines which nearly form a continuous line with little space between adjacent vertebrae, he envisaged the neck and tail to have been much more flexible: "The snake-like head was raised high in the air, or depressed at the will of the animal, now arched swan-like preparatory to a plunge after a fish, now stretched in repose on the water or deflexed in exploring the depths below".

Chart showing several hypotheses on the neck flexibility of elasmosaurids. A – Swan-like neck held upright, B – Ramrod straight neck held out directly in front, C – Downward curve for feeding on benthic prey items, D – Wide horizontal curve, E – Serpentine undulating position. Neck positions B–E would have been within the estimated neck flexibility ranges.

Although followed by many common media depictions, more recent research showed that elasmosaurids were incapable of raising anything more than its head above the water. The weight of their long neck placed the center of gravity behind the front flippers. Thus, elasmosaurids could have raised their head and neck above the water only when in shallow water, where it could rest its body on the bottom. Also, the weight of the neck, the limited musculature, and the limited movement between the vertebrae would have prevented elasmosaurids from raising head and neck very high. The head and shoulders of theses animals probably acted as a rudder. If they moved the anterior part of the body in a certain direction, it would cause the rest of the body to move in that direction. Thus, elasmosaurids would have been unable to swim in one direction while moving its head and neck either horizontally or vertically in a different direction.

One study found that the necks of elasmosaurids were capable of 75–177˚ of ventral movement, 87–155° of dorsal movement, and 94–176° of lateral movement, depending on the amount of tissue between the vertebrae, which probably increased in rigidness towards the back of the neck. The researchers concluded that lateral and vertical arches and shallow S-shaped curves were feasible in contrast to the "swan-like" S-shape neck postures that required more than 360° of vertical flexion.

The exact function of the neck of elasmosaurids is unknown, though it may have been important for hunting. It has also been suggested that the long necks of plesiosaurs served as a snorkel and allowed them to breathe air while the body remained underwater. This is disputed as there would be large hydrostatic pressure differences, particularly for the extremely long-necked elasmosaurids. The neck anatomy of elasmosaurids was capable of making a gentle slope to allow them to breathe at the surface but would have required them to engage in energy-expensive swimming at the sub-surface. In addition, the longer neck would also have increased dead space, and the animals may have required larger lungs. The neck could have had other vulnerabilities, for example being a target for predators.

Simulation of water flow on 3D models showed that more elongated necks, such as those of elasmosaurids, did not increase drag force while swimming compared to shorter necked plesiosaurs. On the other hand, bending the neck sideways did increase drag force, more so in forms with very long necks. Another study found the long necks of elasmosaurs would normally increase drag during forward swimming but this was cancelled out by their large torsos, and hence large body sizes may have facilitated the evolution of longer necks.

=== Feeding ===
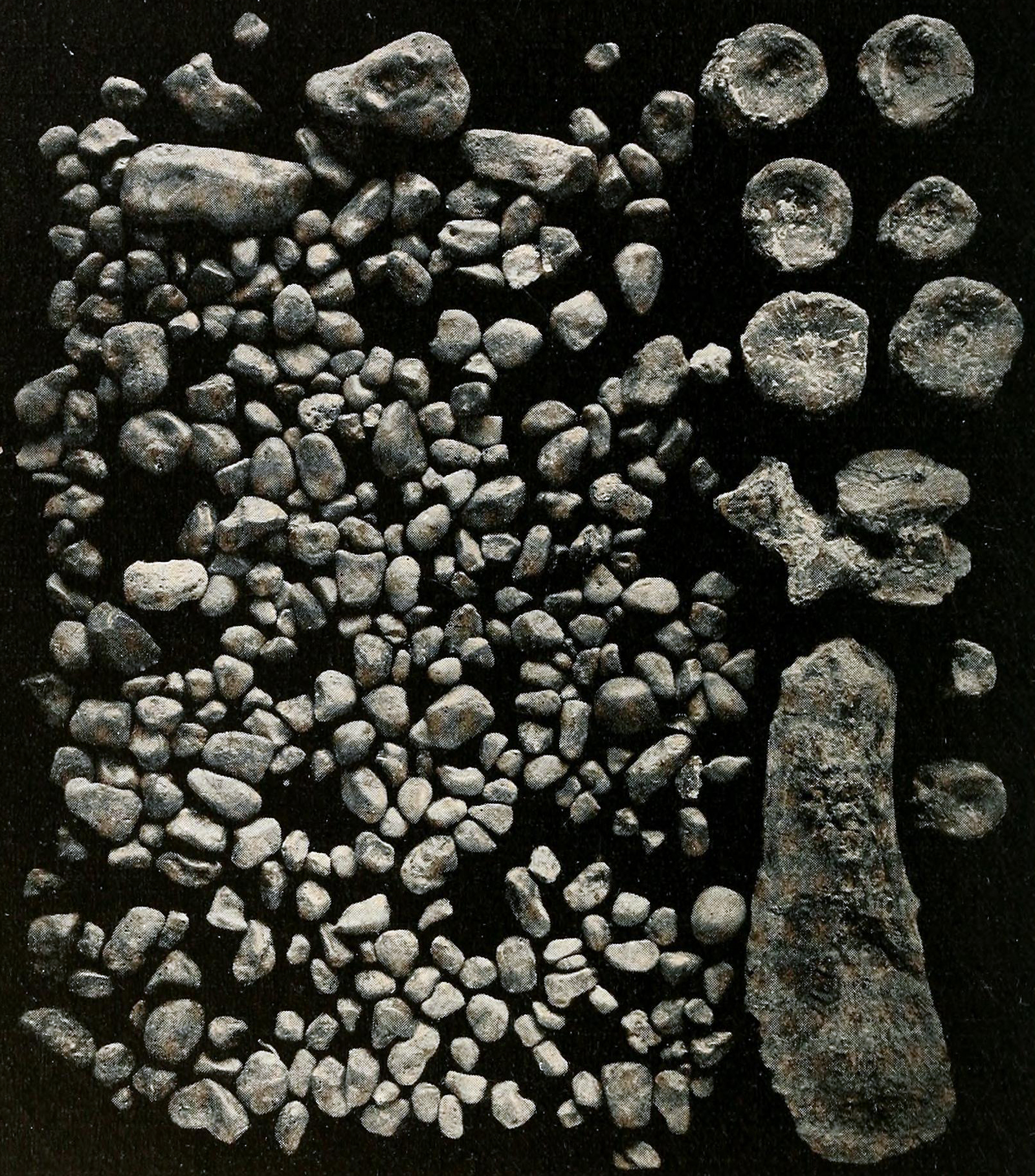
Gastroliths and bones (right) of an undetermined plesiosaur from Kansas

The flexion ranges of elasmosaurids necks would have allowed them to employ a number of hunting methods including "benthic grazing", which would have involved swimming close to the bottom and using the head and neck to dig for prey on the sea floor. Elasmosaurids may also have been active hunters in the pelagic zone, retracting their necks to launch a strike or using side-swipe motions to stun or kill prey with their laterally projected teeth (like sawsharks). It has also been suggested that the predatory abilities of elasmosaurids have been underestimated; their large skulls, big jaw-muscles, strong jaws, and long teeth indicate they could prey on animals between 30 centimeters (12 in) and 2 meters (6.6 ft) long, as indicated by stomach contents including those of sharks, fish, mosasaurs, and cephalopods.

It is possible that elasmosaurids stalked schools of fish, concealing themselves below and moving the head slowly up as they approached. The eyes of theses animals were at the top of the head and allowed them to see directly upward. This stereoscopic vision would have helped it to find small prey. Hunting from below would also have been possible, with prey silhouetted in the sunlight while concealed in the dark waters below. Elasmosaurids probably ate small bony fish and marine invertebrates, as their small, non-kinetic skulls would have limited the size of the prey they could eat. Also, with their long, slender teeth adapted for seizing prey and not tearing, elasmosaurids most certainly swallowed their prey whole.

Elasmosaurids are commonly found with several gastroliths. A specimen of Styxosaurus contained fragmented fish bones and stones in the abdominal region behind the pectoral girdle. The fish remains were identified as Enchodus and other clupeomorph fish. The stones match rock from 600 kilometers (370 mi) away from where the specimen was found. Several different functions have been proposed for gastroliths, including aiding in digestion, mixing food content, mineral supplementation, and storage and buoyancy control.
