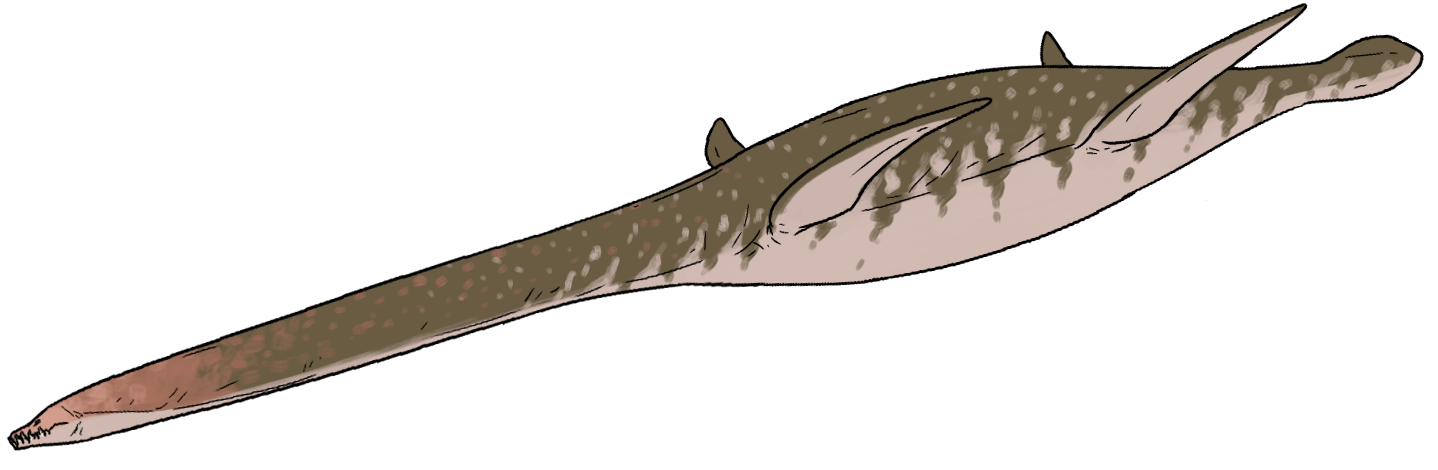
- Life restoration

Scientific classification
- Domain: Eukaryota
- Kingdom: Animalia
- Phylum: Chordata
- Class: Reptilia
- Superorder: †Sauropterygia
- Order: †Plesiosauria
- Family: †Elasmosauridae
- Genus: †Jucha; Fischer et al., 2020
- Species: †J. squalea

Binomial name
- †Jucha squalea Fischer et al., 2020

= Jucha =

Jucha Temporal range: Early Cretaceous, 130 Ma

Extinct genus of reptiles

Jucha is an extinct genus of plesiosaur found in the Hauterivian (Early Cretaceous) Klimovka Formation of Russia. The type species, J. squalea, was one of the basalmost and oldest definitive elasmosaurs known to date.

== Discovery and naming ==
The holotype specimen, UPM 2756/1-53, housed on display at the Undorov Pleontological Museum, was discovered in 2007 in a layer of the Klimovka Formation in the vicinity of the Slantsevy Rudnik village near Ulyanovsk, European Russia. It consists of 17 cervical vertebrae, nine dorsal vertebrae and one isolated neural spine, four caudal vertebrae, and parts of the forelimbs and hindlimbs.

The new genus and species Jucha squalea was described in 2020 by Fisher et al. The genus is named after Jucha, a girl in Turkic demonology who has snake skin, can turn into a dragon, has lived for a thousand years, and can take off her head. This refers to the lack of a skull in the holotype. The holotype was preserved in a mineral crust composed of mainly pyrite, hence the specific epithet squalea, a Latin word meaning "coated" or "rugose".

== Description ==
When fully grown, Jucha grew up to around 5 metres (16 ft) long.
