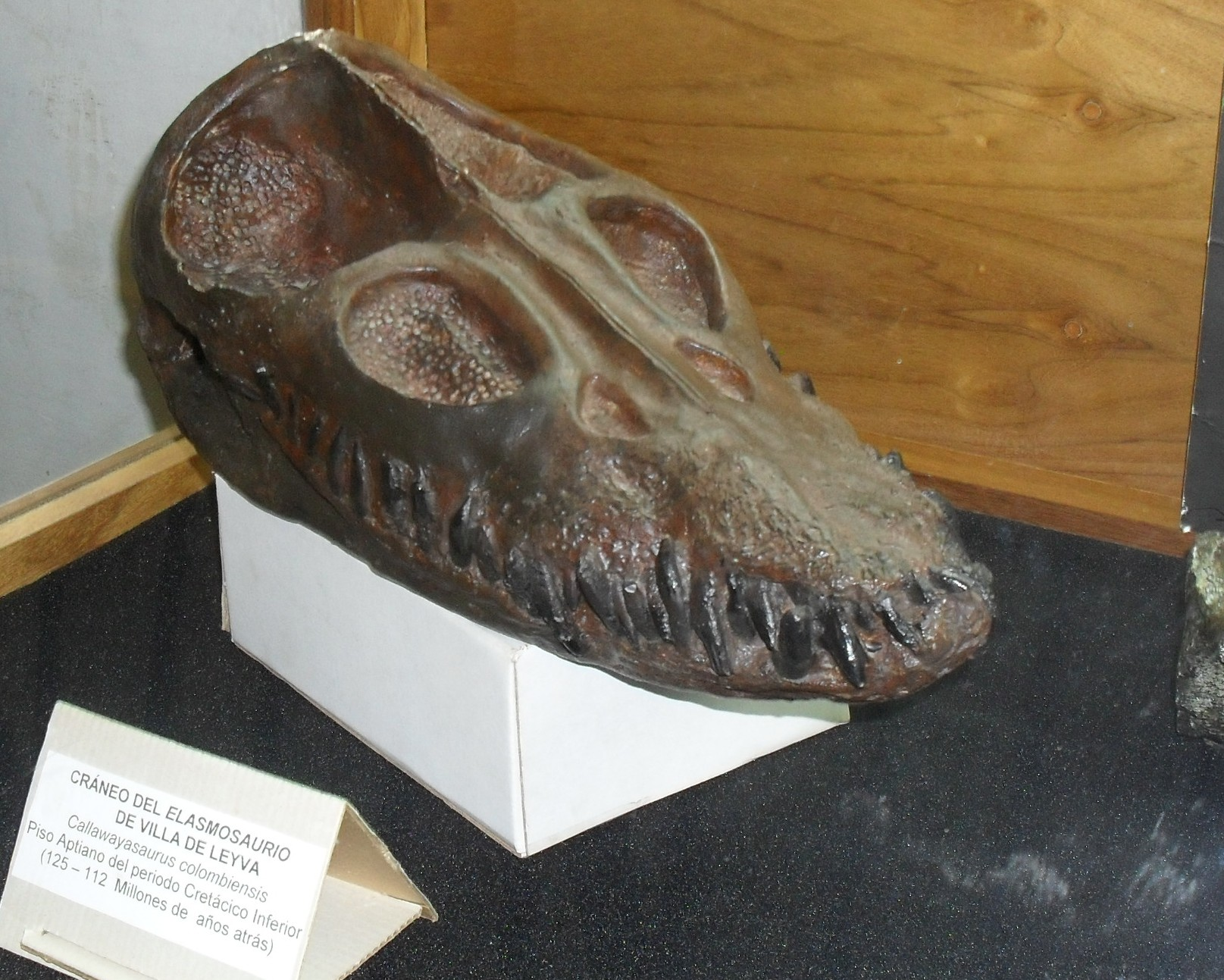
- Skull of Callawayasaurus colombiensis displayed in the Paleontological Museum of Villa de Leyva

Scientific classification
- Kingdom: Animalia
- Phylum: Chordata
- Class: Reptilia
- Superorder: †Sauropterygia
- Order: †Plesiosauria
- Superfamily: †Plesiosauroidea
- Family: †Elasmosauridae
- Genus: †Callawayasaurus; Carpenter, 1999
- Species: †C. colombiensis

Binomial name
- †Callawayasaurus colombiensis (Wells, 1962 [originally Alzadasaurus])

Synonyms
- Alzadasaurus colombiensis Wells, 1962; Callawayosaurus lapsus calami

= Callawayasaurus =

Callawayasaurus Temporal range: Early Cretaceous, 125.45–122.46 Ma

Extinct genus of reptiles

Callawayasaurus is a genus of plesiosaur from the family Elasmosauridae. When the holotype was first described by Samuel Paul Welles in 1962, it was described as Alzadasaurus colombiensis before being moved into its current genus by Kenneth Carpenter in 1999.

== History ==
Callawayasaurus is named in honor of the paleontologist Jack M. Callaway, editor of Ancient Marine Reptiles who, as Carpenter put it, "in his brief career as a vertebrate paleontologist, did much to improve our understanding of marine reptiles." The familiar suffix, -saurus comes from the Greek sauros (σαυρος), meaning "lizard" or "reptile".

== Description ==
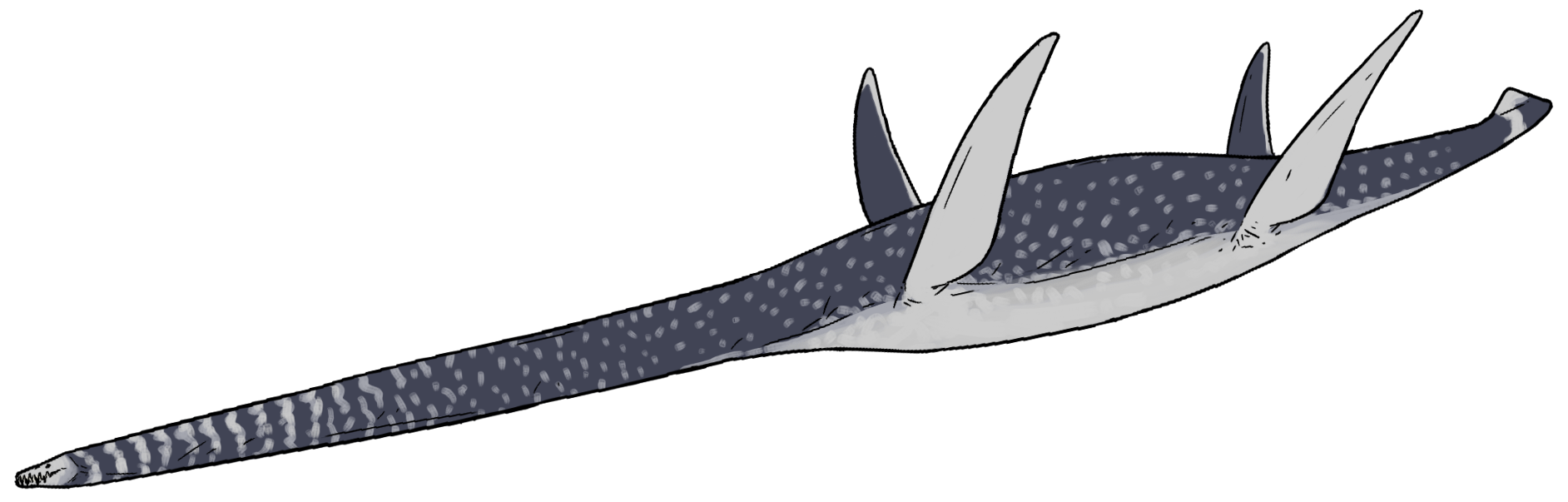
Life restoration

Callawayasaurus was a large plesiosaur, with a skull length of 35 centimetres (1 ft 2 in) and body length of 7.4–8 metres (24–26 ft). The nares of Callawayasaurus are elongated and positioned over the maxilla, which has 3-5 teeth. The neck contains 56 vertebrae which are relatively short compared to other elasmosaurids. Callawayasaurus fossils have no pectoral bars; in common with other plesiosaurs such as Terminonatator. They also lack postaxial accessory facets.

Another nearly complete skeleton was found to be slightly more robust than the holotype specimen. This subtle change may indicate sexual dimorphism.

== Paleoenvironment ==
The first Callawayasaurus remains were found in the Paja Formation near Leiva, Boyaca Colombia. The specific name for the type, "columbiensis", means "from Colombia". Callawayasaurus are known from the Aptian faunal stage of the early Cretaceous period, which extended from 125 to 112 million years ago.

== See also ==
- List of plesiosaur genera
- Timeline of plesiosaur research
