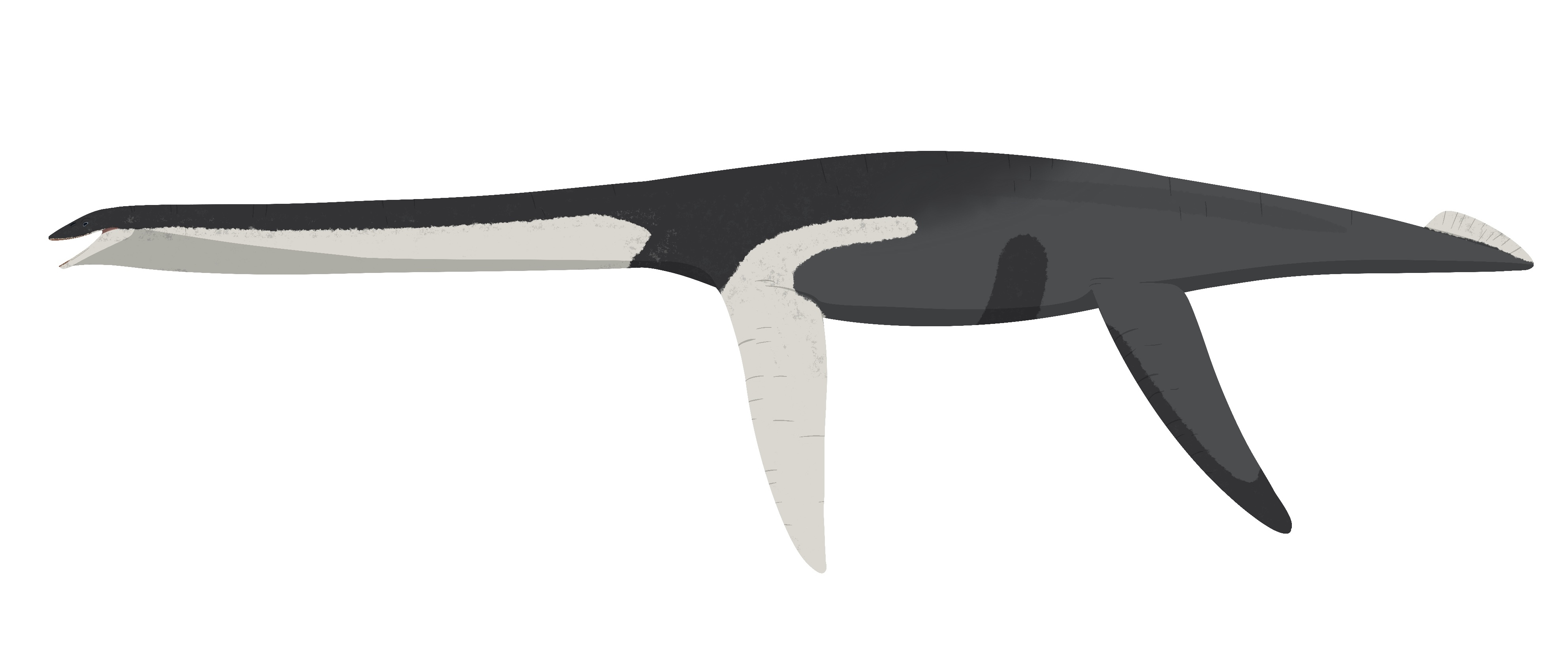
- Life restoration

Scientific classification
- Domain: Eukaryota
- Kingdom: Animalia
- Phylum: Chordata
- Class: Reptilia
- Superorder: †Sauropterygia
- Order: †Plesiosauria
- Family: †Elasmosauridae
- Subfamily: †Aristonectinae
- Genus: †Wunyelfia; Otero et al., 2021
- Species: †W. maulensis

Binomial name
- †Wunyelfia maulensis Otero et al., 2021

= Wunyelfia =

Wunyelfia Temporal range: Maastrichtian, 66 Ma

Extinct genus of reptiles

Wunyelfia is a genus of elasmosaurid plesiosaur, a type of long-necked marine reptile, that lived in the oceans of Late Cretaceous Chile. It contains one species, W. maulensis.

== Etymology ==
The generic name, meant to be pronounced as "goo-niel-fiah", comes from Wüñelfe, the Mapudungun name for the planet Venus, also seen as a mystic symbol of the flower of the Foye, a sacred tree, and a representation of the Mapuche freedom and untamed spirit. The specific name comes from the Región del Maule of Chile where it was found.

== Description ==
Wunyelfia belongs to the elasmosaurid subfamily Aristonectinae and come from the Quiriquina Formation. The holotype SGO.PV.6507 is an associated postcranial remains of a single individual, including the atlas-axis, five anteriormost cervical vertebrae, an isolated mid cervical centrum, the posteriormost cervical centrum, two successive pectoral centra (sensu Sachs et al., 2013), thirteen dorsal vertebrae, three sacral centra, ten caudal centra, most of both coracoids, mid portion of the interclavicular arch, symphyseal portion of left pubis, the acetabular portion of right pubis and the ventral part of the left ilium.
