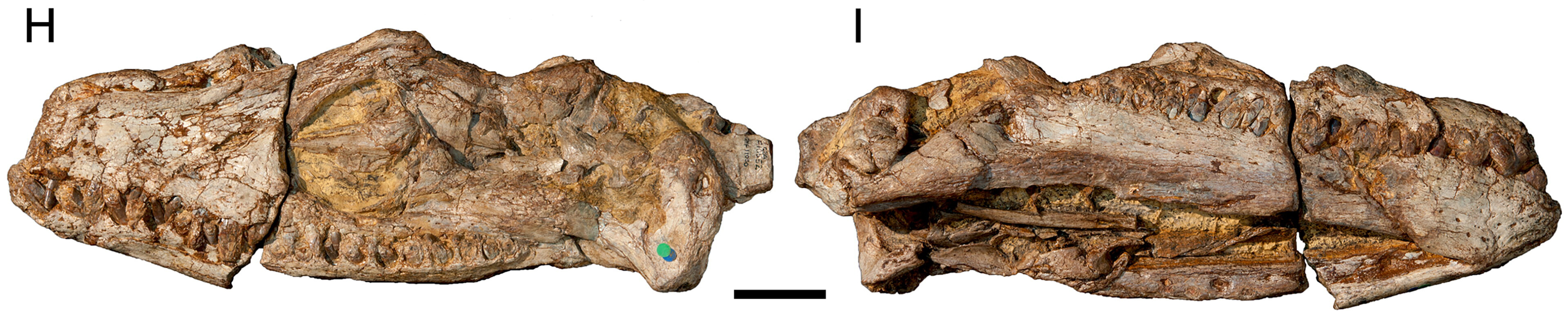
- Holotype skull

Scientific classification
- Kingdom: Animalia
- Phylum: Chordata
- Class: Reptilia
- Superorder: †Sauropterygia
- Order: †Plesiosauria
- Superfamily: †Plesiosauroidea
- Family: †Elasmosauridae
- Genus: †Eromangasaurus; Kear, 2005
- Species: †E. australis

Binomial name
- †Eromangasaurus australis (Sachs, 2005)

Synonyms
- Eromangasaurus carinognathus Kear, 2005; Tuarangisaurus australis Sachs, 2005

= Eromangasaurus =

Eromangasaurus Temporal range: Early Cretaceous, 103 Ma

Extinct genus of reptiles

Eromangasaurus is an extinct genus of elasmosaurid known from northern Queensland of Australia.

== Discovery ==
Eromangasaurus was first named by Benjamin P. Kear in 2005 and the type species is Eromangasaurus australis. Benjamin P. Kear originally named QM F11050 as Eromangasaurus carinognathus. However, earlier in 2005, Sven Sachs named a second species of Tuarangisaurus, Tuarangisaurus australis, on the basis of the same specimen and some referred material.

This nominal has priority over E. carinognathus, and therefore the latter is a junior synonym of T. australis. Later studies of the holotype by Kear pointed out that this species is distinct enough from the type species of Tuarangisaurus to be placed in its own genus. Eromangasaurus was the only available name for the new combination Eromangasaurus australis. E. australis is widely accepted today as the correct name for QM F11050.

The generic name is derived from Eromanga, in reference to the Eromanga Basin in which the holotype was found, and saurus, Greek for "lizard". The specific name is named after Australia, in which the holotype was found.

== Description ==
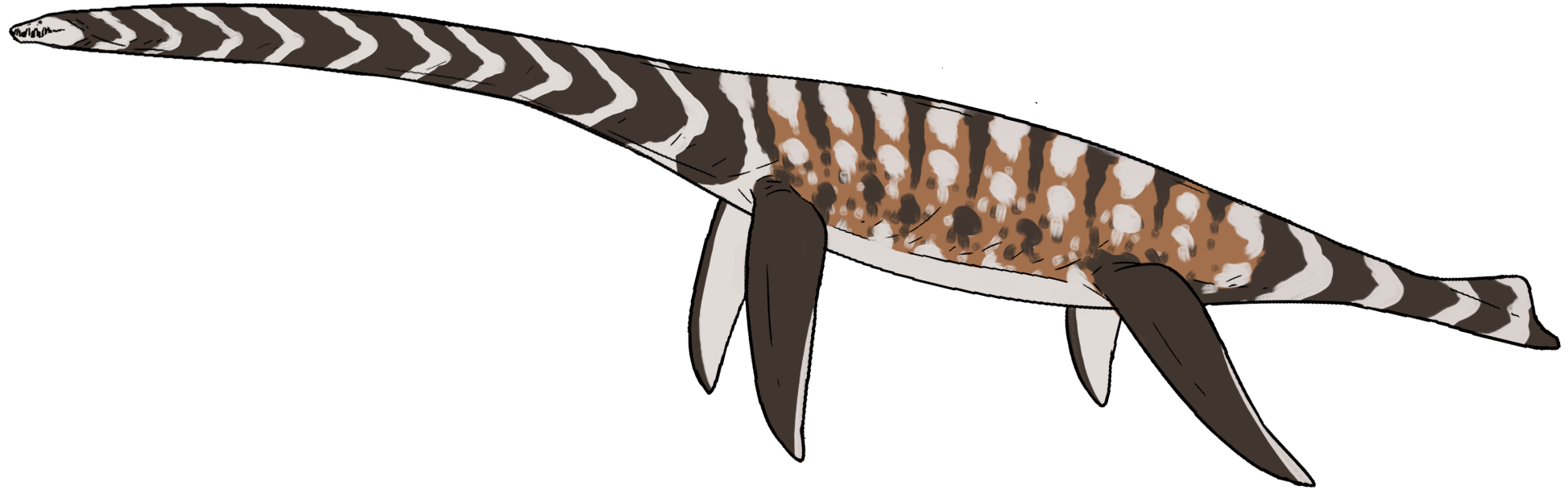
Restoration

Eromangasaurus is a large elasmosaurid, measuring 7 metres (23 ft) in length and weighing 1–2 metric tons (1.1–2.2 short tons). It is known from the holotype QM F11050, a nearly complete but badly crushed skull and mandible. It was collected in Maxwelton, from the Toolebuc Formation of the Eromanga Basin, dating to the late Albian stage of the Early Cretaceous, about 103 million years ago. Sven Sachs mentioned some referred material from the same locality as the holotype, QM F12216-19, an anterior cervical vertebra and QM F12217&2, associated posterior cervical vertebrae.

== Palaeobiology ==
Eromangasaurus fed mainly on clams and snails.

== See also ==
- List of plesiosaur genera
- Timeline of plesiosaur research
