= Samuel Paul Welles =

American palaeontologist (1907–1997)

- Born: November 9, 1909; Gloucester, Massachusetts
- Died: August 6, 1997 (aged 89); San Mateo, California
- Education: University of California (PhD)

Samuel Paul Welles (November 9, 1909 – August 6, 1997) was an American palaeontologist. Welles was a research associate at the Museum of Palaeontology, University of California, Berkeley. He took part in excavations at the Placerias Quarry in 1930 and the Shonisaurus discoveries of 1954 and later, in what is now the Berlin-Ichthyosaur State Park. He accumulated an extensive collection of fossils of marine reptiles, amphibians, and fish, as well as describing the dinosaur Dilophosaurus in 1954 and the elasmosaur Fresnosaurus in 1943.
