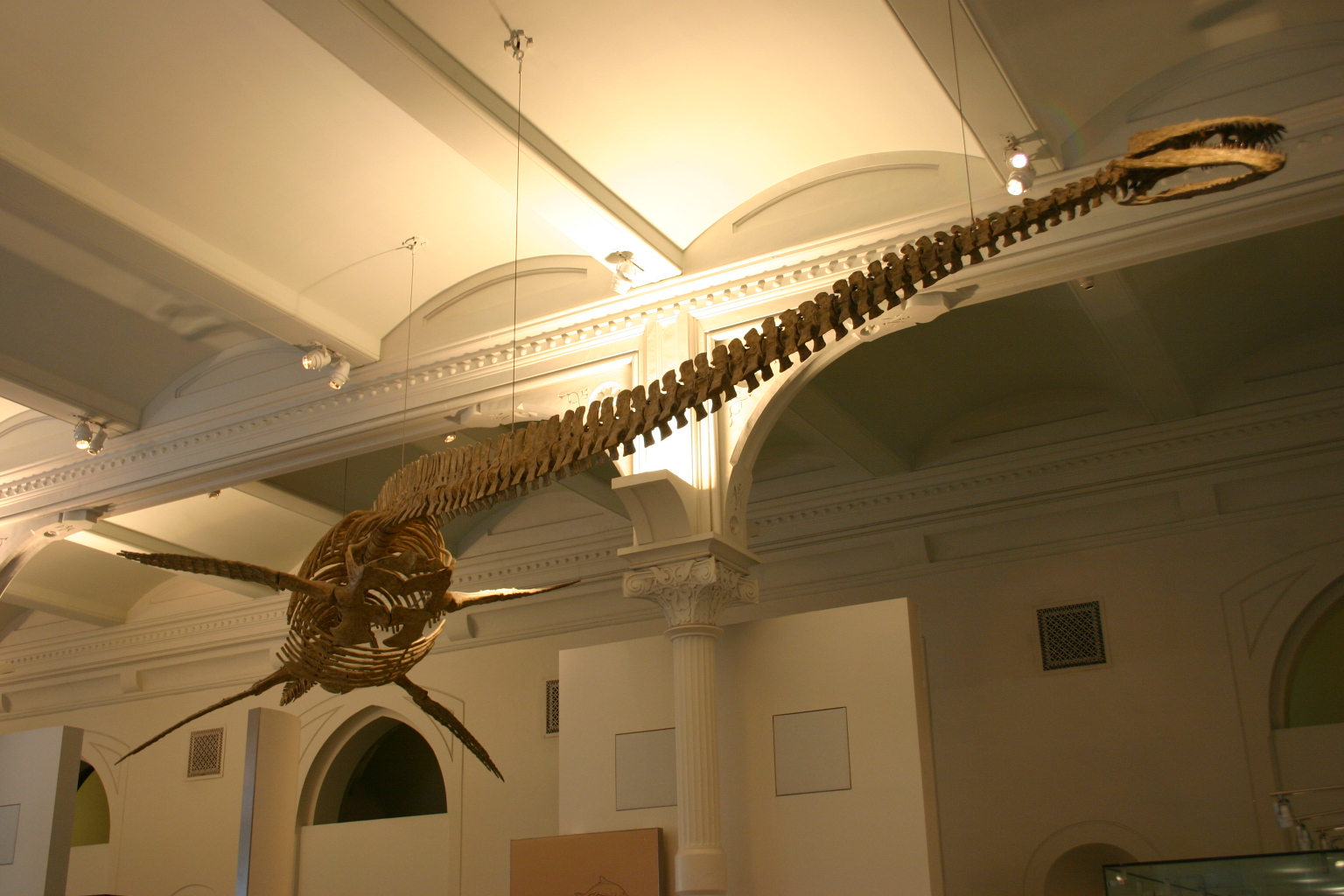
- Mounted cast of the type specimen, American Museum of Natural History

Scientific classification
- Kingdom: Animalia
- Phylum: Chordata
- Class: Reptilia
- Superorder: †Sauropterygia
- Order: †Plesiosauria
- Superfamily: †Plesiosauroidea
- Family: †Elasmosauridae
- Genus: †Thalassomedon; Welles, 1943
- Species: †T. haningtoni

Binomial name
- †Thalassomedon haningtoni Welles, 1943

Synonyms
- Alzadasaurus riggsi Welles, 1943

= Thalassomedon =

Thalassomedon Temporal range: Late Cretaceous, 99.6–93.5 Ma

Extinct genus of reptiles

Thalassomedon (from Greek, thalassa, "sea" and Greek, medon, "lord" or "ruler", meaning "sea lord") is a genus of plesiosaur, named by Welles in 1943.

== Description ==
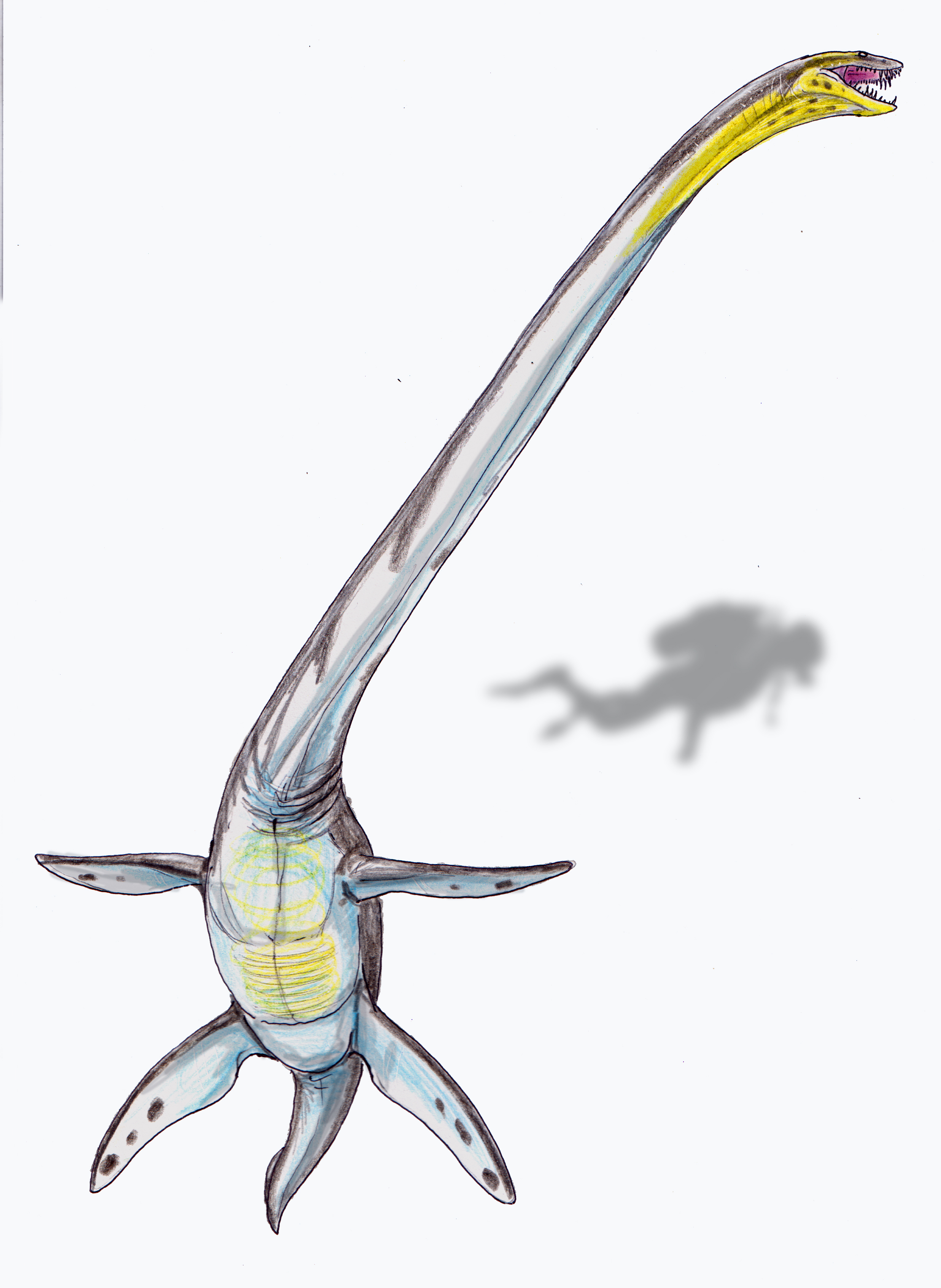
Restoration

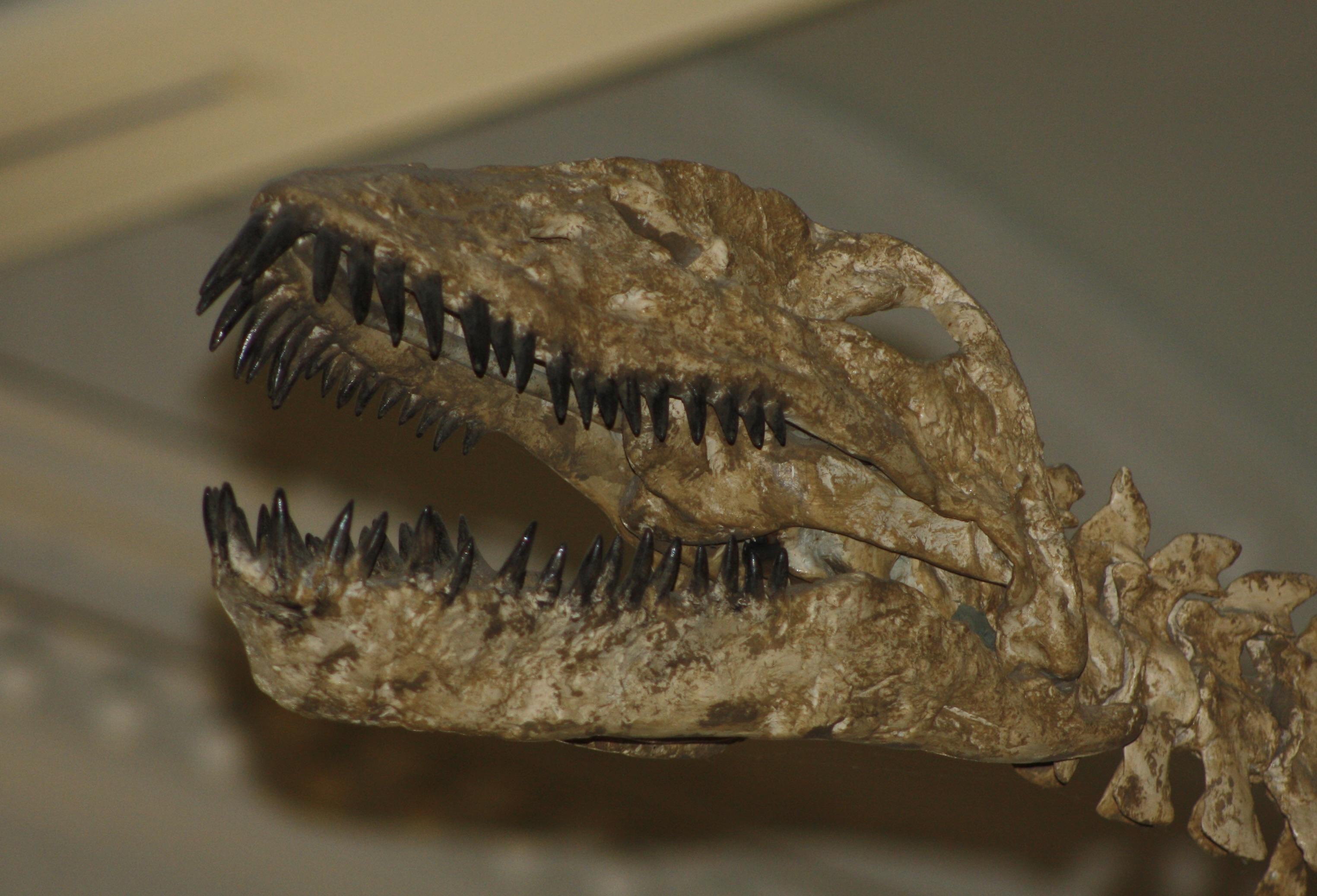
Detail of Thalassomedon skull at the American Museum of Natural History

Thalassomedon is among the largest elasmosaurids, with an estimated body length of 10.86–11.95 metres (35.6–39.2 ft) long and body mass of 4.4–6.8 metric tons (4.9–7.5 short tons). The neck is also very long; it comprises 62 vertebrae and is about 5.9 metres (19 ft) - over half of the total length. The skull is 47 centimetres (19 in; 1.54 ft) long, with 5 centimetres (2.0 in) long teeth. The flippers were about 1.5–2 metres (4.9–6.6 ft) long. Stones have been found in its stomach area leading some to theorize that they were used for ballast or digestion. If the latter, stomach action would cause the stones to help grind ingested food.

== Discovery ==
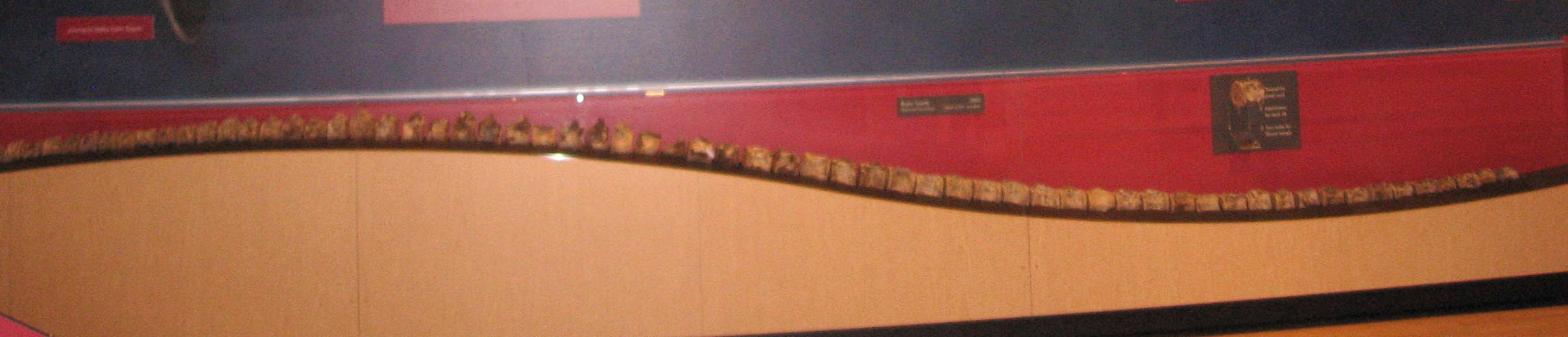
Neck vertebrae

This genus of plesiosaur lived in North America, approximately 95 million years ago - this places it during the Cenomanian stage. Its closest relative is Elasmosaurus, and both belong to the family Elasmosauridae. There are six specimens of varying states of preservation on display at various museums in the United States.

== See also ==
- List of plesiosaur genera
- Timeline of plesiosaur research
