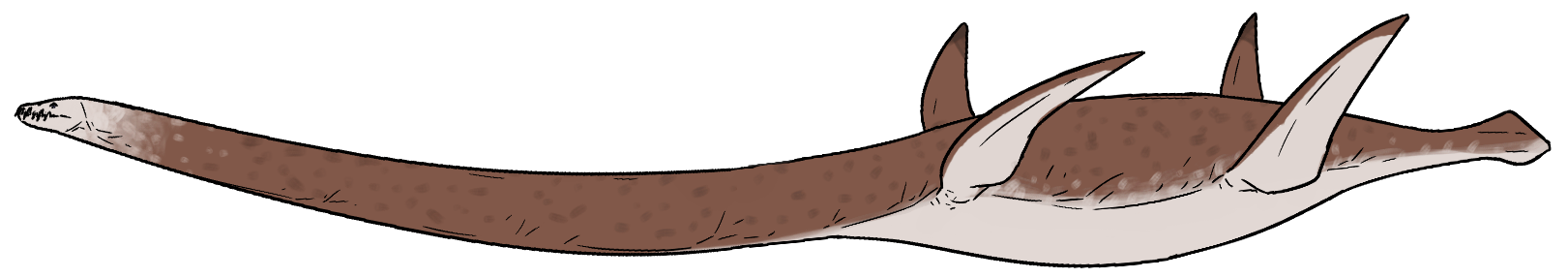
- Life restoration

Scientific classification
- Kingdom: Animalia
- Phylum: Chordata
- Class: Reptilia
- Superorder: †Sauropterygia
- Order: †Plesiosauria
- Superfamily: †Plesiosauroidea
- Family: †Elasmosauridae
- Genus: †Terminonatator; Sato, 2003
- Species: †T. ponteixensis

Binomial name
- †Terminonatator ponteixensis Sato, 2003

= Terminonatator =

Terminonatator Temporal range: Late Cretaceous, Campanian

Extinct genus of reptiles

Terminonatator (meaning "last swimmer") is a genus of elasmosaurid plesiosaur from the Late Cretaceous of Saskatchewan, Canada. It is known from a skull and partial skeleton from a young adult, found in the Campanian-age Bearpaw Formation near Notukeu Creek in Ponteix. Terminonatator is currently one of the youngest plesiosaurs from the Western Interior Seaway.

== Description ==
Terminonatator is based on RSM P2414.1, a skull and partially articulated incomplete skeleton found high in the Bearpaw Formation. Tamaki Sato, who named and described the specimen in 2003, used the genus name to emphasize its lateness in the fossil record, and the species epithet ponteixensis for Ponteix. Only one species has been described: the type species T. ponteixensis.

RSM P2414.1 appears to represent an adult, because the neural arches are fused to their vertebrae, although incomplete fusion elsewhere indicates it was a young adult. It would have been small as an adult for an elasmosaurid, at only about 7 m (23 ft) long, up to 9 m (30 ft) if it had an extremely long neck like Elasmosaurus (which had 72 neck vertebrae).

The skull as preserved is 26.8 cm (10.6 in) long, but is broken near the posterior end. Compared to other elasmosaurids, the snout was relatively short. Unlike other plesiosaurs, the pineal foramen in the roof of the skull was closed, and there were only nine teeth in the premaxillary bones that form the tip of the snout instead of ten, although this could be individual variation. The right jaw is better preserved than the left; at least 13 teeth were present in the right maxilla (the main tooth-bearing bone of the upper jaw), and 17 to 18 teeth were present in the right dentary, which held teeth in lower jaw. There was an unusually tall bony process on the coronoid, a bone of the lower jaw. Impressions of part of the brain and other cranial nervous tissue were found in the braincase.

The backbone is incomplete, but 51 neck, 17 back, four sacral, and 12 tail vertebrae were preserved. Over 150 pebbles, representing gastroliths, were found within the rib cage; the largest has a diameter of 6 cm (2.4 in). The shoulder and pelvic girdle are fragmentary. The thigh bone was longer than the upper arm, which is unusual for an elasmosaurid, and the right thigh bone was broken and healed.

Terminonatator is significant because of its late age, its inclusion of a skull with most of a skeleton, and its nature as an elasmosaurid (the remains of short-necked plesiosaurs are more common in comparable rocks in Canada). The remains of comparable elasmosaurids are poorly preserved, and/or have poorly described skulls, making comparisons of this genus to other elasmosaurids difficult at this time.

== See also ==
- List of plesiosaur genera
- Timeline of plesiosaur research
