= 1943 in paleontology =

List of years in paleontology	(table)
- … 1933; 1934; 1935; 1936; 1937; 1938; 1939; 1940; 1941; 1942; 1943; 1944; 1945; 1946; 1947; 1948; 1949; 1950; 1951; 1952; 1953 …
- In science 1940 1941 1942 1943 1944 1945 1946
- Art; Archaeology; Architecture; Literature; Music; Philosophy; Science; +...

Paleontology or palaeontology is the study of prehistoric life forms on Earth through the examination of plant and animal fossils. This includes the study of body fossils, tracks (ichnites), burrows, cast-off parts, fossilised feces (coprolites), palynomorphs and chemical residues. Because humans have encountered fossils for millennia, paleontology has a long history both before and after becoming formalized as a science. This article records significant discoveries and events related to paleontology that occurred or were published in the year 1943.

== Dinosaurs ==
Name	Novelty	Status	Authors	Age	Type locality	Location	Notes	Images
Mandschurosaurus laosensis	Sp. nov.	Nomen dubium	Hoffet	Aptian-Albian	Grès supérieurs Formation	Laos	A species of Mandschurosaurus	
Pachycephalosaurus	Gen. et sp. nov.	Valid	Brown & Schlaikjer	Maastrichtian	Lance Formation	USA	A new genus which at the time had the type species P. grangeri and includes the new combination for Troodon wyomingensis, P. grangeri is a synonym of P. wyomingensis which is a conserved name	
Troodon sternbergi	Sp. nov.	Valid	Brown & Schlaikjer	Campanian	Dinosaur Park Formation	Canada	A species of Troodon now Hanssuesia sternbergi	
Troodon edmontonensis	Sp. nov.	Valid	Brown & Schlaikjer	Maastrichtian	Horseshoe Canyon Formation	Canada	A species of Troodon now Sphaerotholus edmontonense	

== Plesiosaurs ==
=== New taxa ===
Name	Status	Authors	Location	Images
Alzadasaurus	syn of Thalassomedon	Welles	USA (Montana)	
Aphrosaurus	Valid	Welles	USA (California)	
Fresnosaurus	Valid	Welles	USA (California)	
Hydralmosaurus	Synonym of Styxosaurus.	Welles		
Hydrotherosaurus	Valid	Welles	USA (California)	
Morenosaurus	Valid	Welles	USA (California)	
Thalassomedon	Valid	Welles	USA (Colorado and Montana)	Thalassomedon
Thalassonomosaurus	Synonym of Styxosaurus.	Welles		

== Synapsids ==
=== Non-mammalian ===
Name	Status	Authors	Age	Location	Notes	Images
Dinodontosaurus	Valid	Romer	237 millions of years ago	Argentina; Brazil	The Dicinodont with terrible teeth.	Dinodontosaurus Exaeretodon
Exaeretodon	Valid	Cabrera	226 millions of years ago	Argentina; Brazil; India	This was a plant-eating Cynodont.	Dinodontosaurus Exaeretodon
Theropsis	Valid					Dinodontosaurus Exaeretodon
