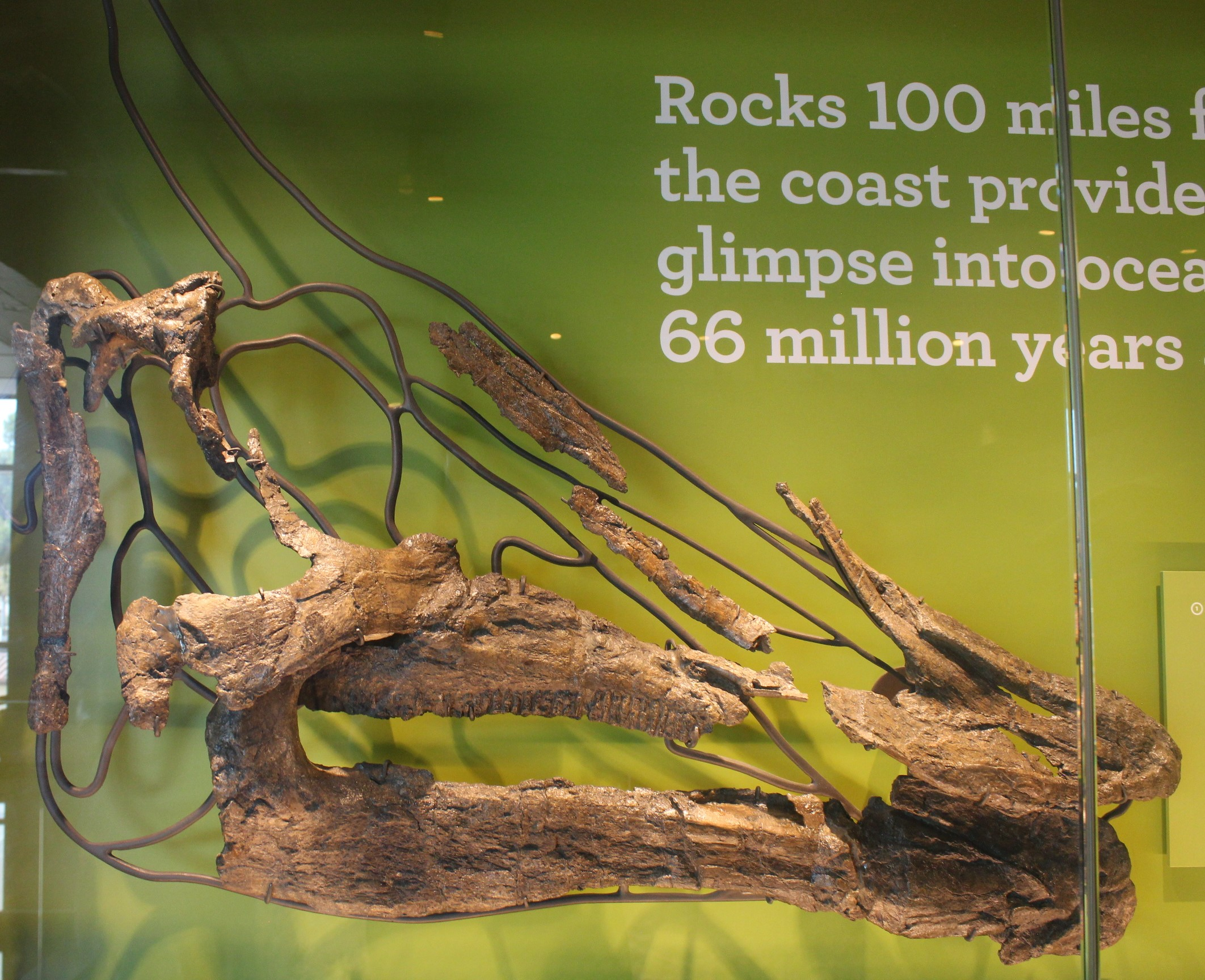
- Holotype skull, Natural History Museum of Los Angeles County

Scientific classification
- Kingdom: Animalia
- Phylum: Chordata
- Class: Reptilia
- Clade: Dinosauria
- Clade: †Ornithischia
- Clade: †Ornithopoda
- Family: †Hadrosauridae
- Subfamily: †Saurolophinae
- Genus: †Augustynolophus; Prieto-Márquez et al., 2014
- Species: †A. morrisi

Binomial name
- †Augustynolophus morrisi (Prieto-Márquez & Wagner, 2013)

Synonyms
- Saurolophus morrisi Prieto-Márquez & Wagner, 2013

= Augustynolophus =

Augustynolophus Temporal range: Late Cretaceous, 70–66 Ma

Extinct genus of dinosaurs

Augustynolophus is an extinct genus of herbivorous saurolophine hadrosaur dinosaur which was discovered in the Moreno Formation in California, dating to the late Maastrichtian age, making it one of the last non-avian dinosaurs known from the fossil record before the Cretaceous–Paleogene extinction event.

== History of discovery ==
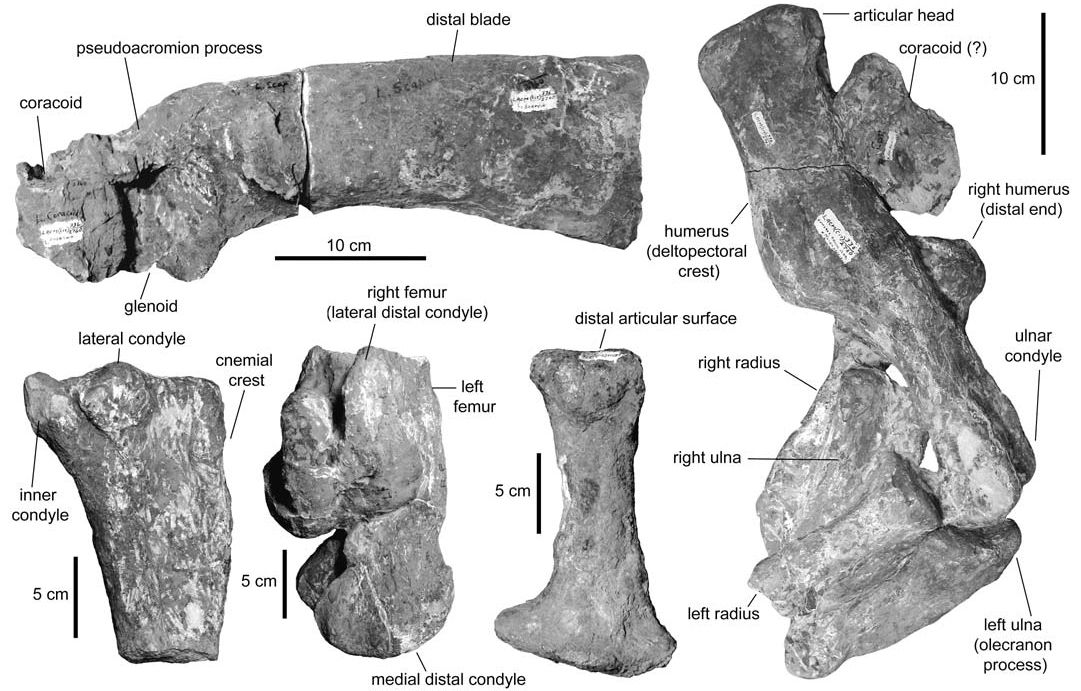
Pectoral and limb elements

The generic name derives from a combination of the Augustyn family, who helped support the Los Angeles County Museum, and the suffix "-lophus," meaning crest, a reference to its relative Saurolophus. The specific name refers to palaeontologist William Morris. It was originally described as a species of Saurolophus, S. morrisi. However, when a more in-depth study took place, the end results revealed that its cranial structure was vastly different when it was juxtaposed with the other known members of the tribe Saurolophini, most notably Saurolophus osborni and Saurolophus angustirostris and Prosaurolophus maximus and therefore, it was determined to be a separate genus.

All known specimens of Augustynolophus have been found only in California, which was a part of Laramidia, among the best locations for dinosaur fossils. There are currently two known specimens of Augustynolophus. The holotype, LACM/CIT 2852, was unearthed in 1943. It consisted of the majority of the skull (including the dentary and predentary), vertebrae, and bones of the limb and hand. The second specimen was designated LACM/CIT 2760. Discovered in 1939, it was made up of elements of the skull and limbs. Due to its smaller size, it may have been a juvenile. It is one of three named dinosaurs from the western coast of the United States, the other two being the Campanian Aletopelta coombsi, and the sea bird Ichthyornis. Additionally there are a number of fragmentary remains which have been found of dinosaurs in all of the western coastal states, California, Oregon, and Washington. In addition to a tyrannosaur from Sucia Island of Washington, fragmentary remains of indeterminate hadrosaurs and ornithopods have been found throughout California as far back as the 1930s and more recently Oregon as well. In September 2017, Augustynolophus was declared the official state dinosaur of California.

== Description ==
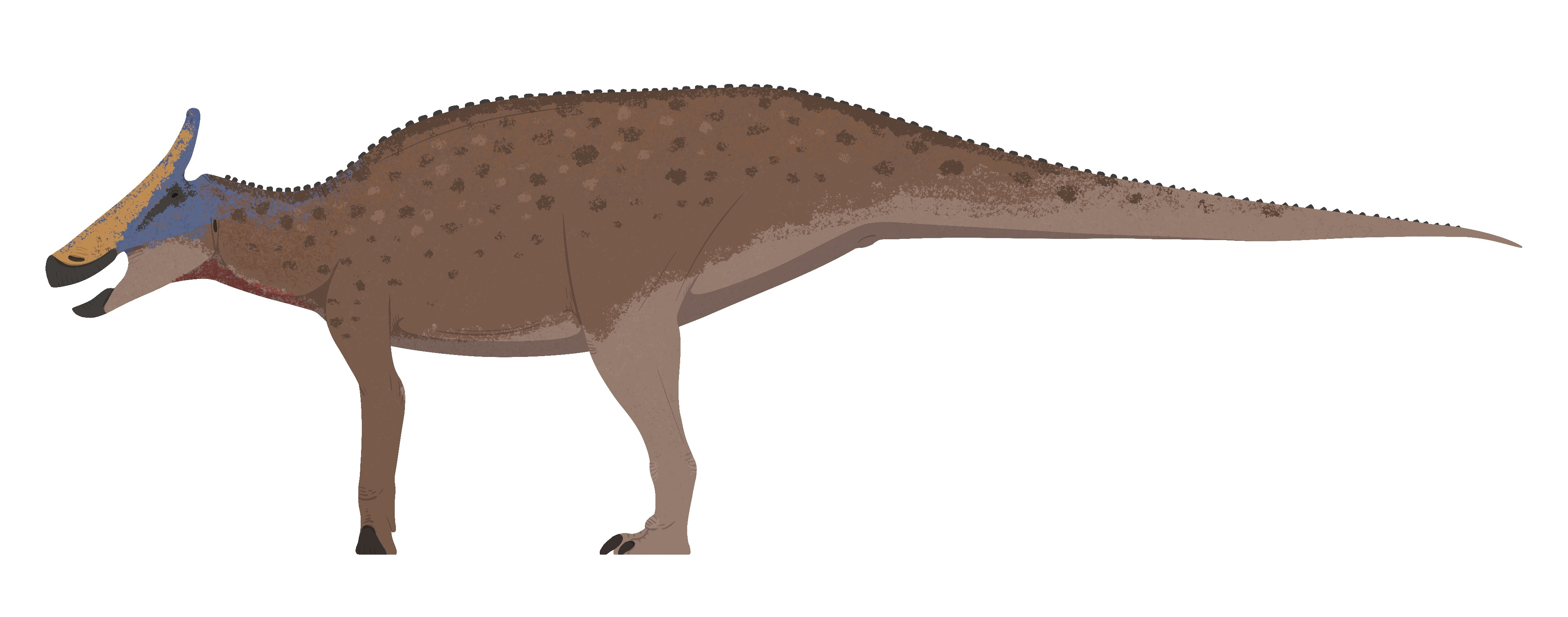
Life restoration

Augustynolophus was a large hadrosaur, reaching 8 metres (26 ft) in length and 3 metric tons (3.3 short tons) in body mass. Like all species of hadrosaur, Augustynolophus morrisi was a herbivorous dinosaur which had a diet consisting of the plant life in the area, it was specialized to chew its food since hadrosaurs were one of the few known species of dinosaur that chewed its food.

== Paleoecology ==
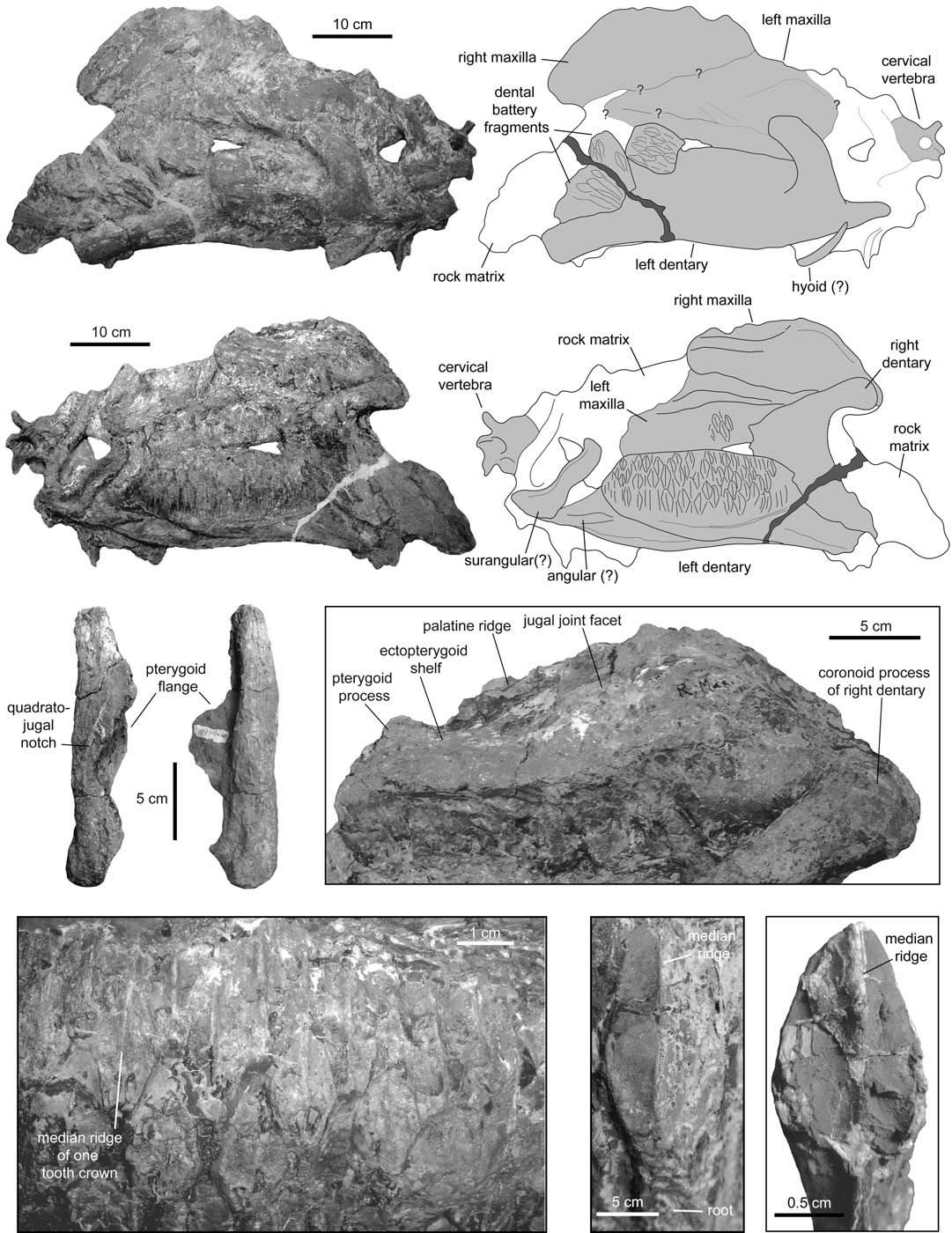
Facial and mandibular elements

Very is little is known about the fauna found in the coastal states of Laramida, which is a stark similarity to the neighboring island continent of Appalachia which was on the opposite side of the Western Interior Seaway. The western United States has a rich history of rich fossil finds, most notable examples include the Hell Creek Formation and the Two Medicine Formation. However, like with Appalachia, the land fauna of western Laramidia, most notably the dinosaurs, is not well studied and are not well known.

However, despite the fact that dinosaur fossils are rare in California, the Moreno Formation is one of the more well studied Mesozoic geological formations in California and like Appalachia, it is more well known for the large amount of marine fossils. Augustynolophus shared its environment with a wide variety of marine creatures which consisted of non-marine turtles, mosasaurs, plesiosaurs and ray-finned fish. The turtles that lived in this region included Basilemys and Osteopygis. Mosasaurs were very common in this region and 4 species have been unearthed from this fossil formation. They include Prognathodon, Halisaurus, Plesiotylosaurus, and Plotosaurus. Plesiosaurs that inhabited the Moreno Formation consisted of 4 genera: Fresnosaurus, Morenosaurus, Aphrosaurus, and Hydrotherosaurus. Bonnerichthys and Saurodon were the only ray-finned fish found here. Indeterminate hadrosaur fossils are common in California too.

== See also ==
- Timeline of hadrosaur research
- List of California state symbols
