= Moreno Formation =

Mesozoic geologic formation in San Joaquin Valley, California

- Stratigraphic range: Maastrichtian 70–66 Ma
- Type: Geological formation
- Unit of: Chico Group
- Underlies: Unconformity with the Martinez Formation and Tejon Formation
- Overlies: Panoche Formation
- Thickness: 1,600–2,000 ft (487.68–609.60 m)

Lithology
- Primary: Shale
- Other: Sandstone

Location
- Region: San Joaquin Valley, California
- Country: United States

The Moreno Formation is a Mesozoic geologic formation located in San Joaquin Valley (California).
Dinosaur remains diagnostic to the genus level are among the fossils that have been recovered from the formation.

== Paleofauna ==
Color key: Taxon / Reclassified taxon / Taxon falsely reported as present / Dubious taxon or junior synonym / Ichnotaxon / Ootaxon / Morphotaxon	Notes; Uncertain or tentative taxa are in small text; ~~crossed out~~ taxa are discredited.

=== Cartilaginous fish ===
Cartilaginous fishes reported from the Moreno Formation
Genus	Species	Location	Member	Material	Notes	Images
Heptranchias	H. sp					

=== Ray-finned fish ===
Ray-finned fishes reported from the Moreno Formation
Genus	Species	Location	Member	Material	Notes	Images
Bonnerichthys	B. gladius				A large, filter-feeding pachycormid.	Bonnerichthys
Saurodon	S. sp.				An ichthyodectid.	Saurodon

=== Dinosaurs ===
Indeterminate saurolophine hadrosaur remains have been unearthed in the area as far back as the 1930s.

Dinosaurs reported from the Moreno Formation
Genus	Species	Location	Member	Material	Notes	Images
Augustynolophus	A. morrisi				saurolophine.	Augustynolophus
Saurolophus	S. morrisi				Reclassified as Augustynolophus morrisi.	

=== Mosasaurs ===
Mosasaurs reported from the Moreno Formation
Genus	Species	Location	Member	Material	Notes	Images
Kolposaurus	K. bennisoni				The name Kolposaurus was preoccupied and its two constituent species moved to the new genus Plotosaurus.	
Kolposaurus	K. tuckeri				The name Kolposaurus was preoccupied and its two constituent species moved to the new genus Plotosaurus.	
Plesiotylosaurus	P. crassidens					Plesiotylosaurus crassidens
Plotosaurus	P. bennisoni					Plotosaurus bennisoni
Plotosaurus	P. tuckeri				A junior synonym of P. bennisoni.	Plotosaurus bennisoni
Prognathodon	P. cf. waiparaensis					
cf. Mosasaurus	cf. M. sp.					
Halisaurus	H. sp.					

=== Plesiosaurs ===
Plesiosaurs reported from the Moreno Formation
Genus	Species	Location	Member	Material	Notes	Images
Aphrosaurus	A. furlongi					Aphrosaurus
Fresnosaurus	F. drescheri					Fresnosaurus
Hydrotherosaurus	H. alexandrae					Hydrotherosaurus
Morenosaurus	M. stocki					Morenosaurus

=== Turtles ===
Testudines reported from the Moreno Formation
Genus	Species	Location	Member	Material	Notes	Images
Adocus					J. Howard Hutchison later referred the specimen originally identified as Adocus by to the genus Basilemys.	
Basilemys						
Osteopygis						

=== Foraminifera ===
Forams reported from the Moreno Formation
Genus	Species	Location	Member	Material	Notes	Images
Anomalina	A. pseudopopillosa		Tierra Loma Shale Member			
Bulimina	B. obtusa		Tierra Loma Shale Member		99% of the foraminifera sampled at the Tierra Loma Shale Member belonged to B. obtusa.	
Dentalina	D. legumen		Tierra Loma Shale Member			
Frondicularia	F. undulosa		Tierra Loma Shale Member			
Gyroidina	G. depressa		Tierra Loma Shale Member			
Nodosaria	N. monile		Tierra Loma Shale Member			
Nodosaria	N. pomuligera		Tierra Loma Shale Member			
Nodosaria	N. spinifera		Tierra Loma Shale Member			
Nodosaria	N. sp		Tierra Loma Shale Member			
Nodosarella	N. sp		Tierra Loma Shale Member			

== See also ==
- List of dinosaur-bearing rock formations
  - List of stratigraphic units with few dinosaur genera
