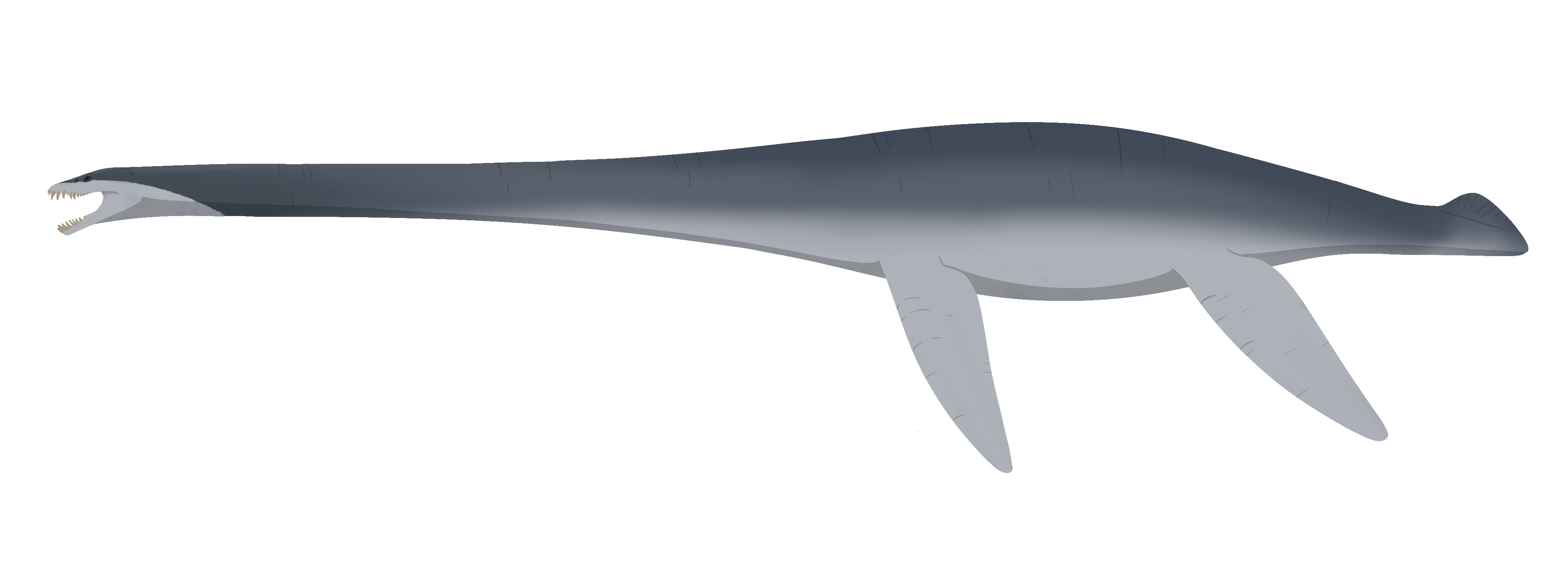
- Life restoration

Scientific classification
- Kingdom: Animalia
- Phylum: Chordata
- Class: Reptilia
- Superorder: †Sauropterygia
- Order: †Plesiosauria
- Superfamily: †Plesiosauroidea
- Family: †Elasmosauridae
- Clade: †Weddellonectia
- Genus: †Aphrosaurus; Welles, 1943

Type species
- Aphrosaurus furlongi Welles, 1943

= Aphrosaurus =

Aphrosaurus Temporal range: Late Cretaceous, 70–66 Ma

Extinct genus of reptiles

Aphrosaurus is an extinct genus of plesiosaur from the Maastrichtian. The type species is Aphrosaurus furlongi (LACM 2748), named by Welles in 1943. The holotype specimen was discovered in the Moreno Formation in Fresno County, California in 1939 by rancher Frank C. Piava. A second specimen - LACM 2832 - was also found in the same formation and initially diagnosed as a juvenile of the same species, but has since been removed from the genus.

== Discovery ==
In 1943, Samuel Welles described Aphrosaurus furlongi along with several other plesiosaurs from the same fossil assemblage in Fresno County, California. Aphrosaurus was found below a different juvenile species, Morenosaurus stocki, within the Tierra Loma Member of the Panoche Hills. The Moreno Formation dates back to the early Maastrichtian, and is composed of depositional layers of turbidite, sandstone, and shale. It is part of the larger Chico Formation, which contacts the Panoche Formation and, during the Cretaceous, composed a sea shelf along the coast of California and the Pacific Ocean.

The diagnosis of Aphrosaurus as a unique species was initially determined by the presence of a deepened ventral notch on the centra of the cervical vertebrae, which was determined to be an autapomorphy of the species. LACM 2832, found in the same formation, was also initially determined to be Aphrosaurus with ontogenic features, but that classification was rejected in a reappraisal on the basis of systemic differences between the two specimens that likely could not be explained by ontogeny.

Welles took the name Aphrosaurus from the Greek for "sea foam" + "lizard", and furlongi in honor of University of California Berkeley field assistant and specimen preparator Eustace Furlong.

The axial skeleton of the holotype fossil is composed of 18 cervical, three pectoral, and 15 dorsal vertebrae, though Welles initially described "10 posterior cervical preceded by 11 indeterminate cervical and followed by 17 crushed dorsals." The diagnostic ventral groove is visible on the 14th to 6th prepectorals, and the prezygapophyses project anteriorly and meet. Only a few of the vertebrae retain the diapophyses, which slant ventrally in the more posterior half, though that may be an artifact of being crushed. Only three dorsal ribs are preserved, each different from each other, suggesting that they are each from a different section of the skeleton.

In addition to the axial skeleton, a good portion of the appendicular skeleton was also preserved. Both the pectoral and pelvic girdles are mostly complete, with a smooth clavicle-interclavicle complex lacking the keel and suture lines. The scapulae shape is indeterminate due to damage, but likely met in the midline. Two elements were initially labeled by Welles as the ilium, which was rectified when O'Gorman articulated both with the ischium and was able to classify one as a sacral rib instead.

Both fore and hind limbs were preserved, though both humeri and the left femur are very badly damaged. The left humerus has a large muscle scar on the ventral surface. The radius and ulna in both limbs are wider than long, a typical feature seen in plesiosaurus, and an epipodial foramen is present on the right forelimb despite Welles' initial analysis indicating none present. Welles noted that the right forelimb is severely distorted, and suggested that it was the result of a pathology sustained to the animal when it was alive. The hind limb description is based entirely on the right hind limb due to the damage to the left, and has no separation between the trochanter and capitulum. There is a raised muscle scar on the ventral surface.

No skull exists.

== Description ==
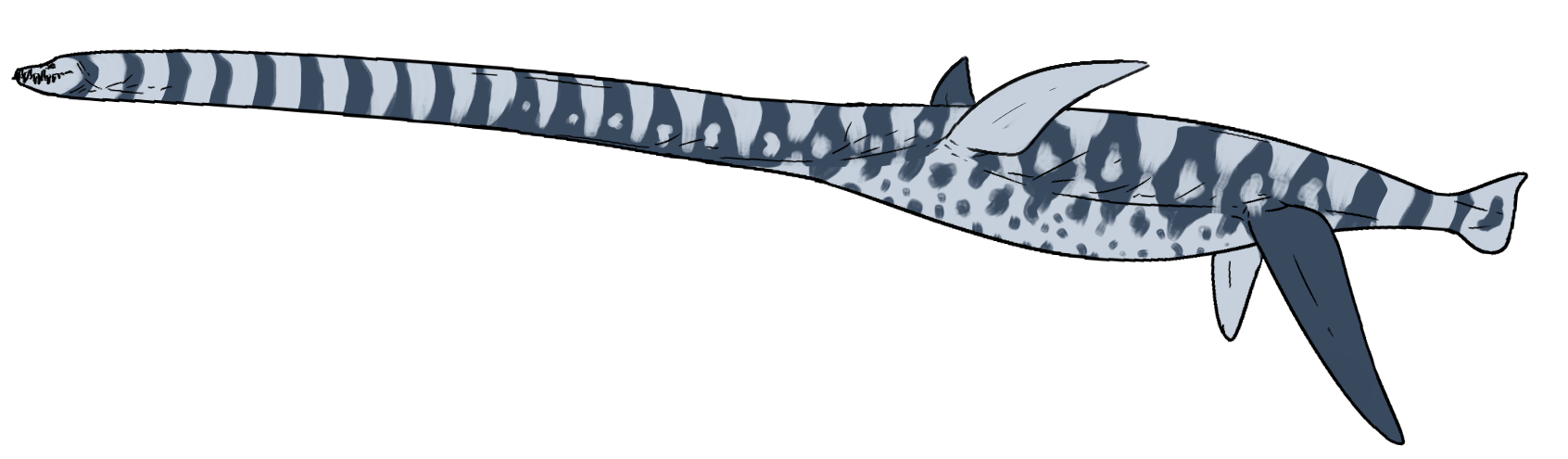
Life restoration

Aphrosaurus was a large, highly derived plesiosaur. A 2005 study by O'Keefe et al. comparing the body size and proportions of plesiosaurs across time show that Aphrosaurus, like other late-Cretaceous plesiosaurs, was comparatively large, and a 2001 study also by O'Keefe comparing flipper aspect ratio with equivalent wing proportions on birds and planes indicate a gliding, long-distance type of travel with low agility. Welles described it as "likely less active than Morenosaurus."

Like most plesiosauromorphs, Aphrosaurus probably ate a diet of relatively small prey that were then ground up by gastroliths. A 2008 study by Zammit et al. using a model of the complete vertebral column and neck indicated that while Aphrosaurus and similar plesiosaurs would not have been able to create a "swan curve" of the neck to strike, other feeding methods, including benthic grazing, shallow horizontal curving for ambush, and horizontal or vertical shearing during active pursuit would have been possible.

Based on the fossil assemblage of the Moreno Formation, Aphrosaurus shared the waters of the Late-Cretaceous Pacific with a diverse spread of mosasaurs, turtles, and a variety of other plesiosaurs: Morenosaurus, Fresnosaurus, and Hydrotherosaurus, the latter two of which were larger than Aphrosaurus. Notably, five different genera of mosasaurs, mostly mosasaurines, have been discovered in the Moreno Formation. The lack of plioplatocarpines was hypothesized by Lindgren and Schulp in 2010 to indicate an environment as an open ocean with high piscivore competition for resources. Similar genera of mosasaurs in both the Moreno Formation and Western Interior Seaway indicates free exchange of species between both environments.

Within the mostly morphologically similar elasmosaurids, Aphrosaurus can be differentiated by the presence of a deepened ventral notch along the centra of the cervical vertebrae, and a wide, dorsal-ventrally compressed interclavicle-clavicle complex that lacks a ridge along the sternum.

== Classification ==
The Elasmosaurid clade is highly unstable. However, current phylogenetic studies have recovered Aphrosaurus in a highly nested position within the Weddellonectia clade, but outside of the Aristonectinae with the filter-feeding Aristonectes.

== See also ==
- Timeline of plesiosaur research
- List of plesiosaur genera
