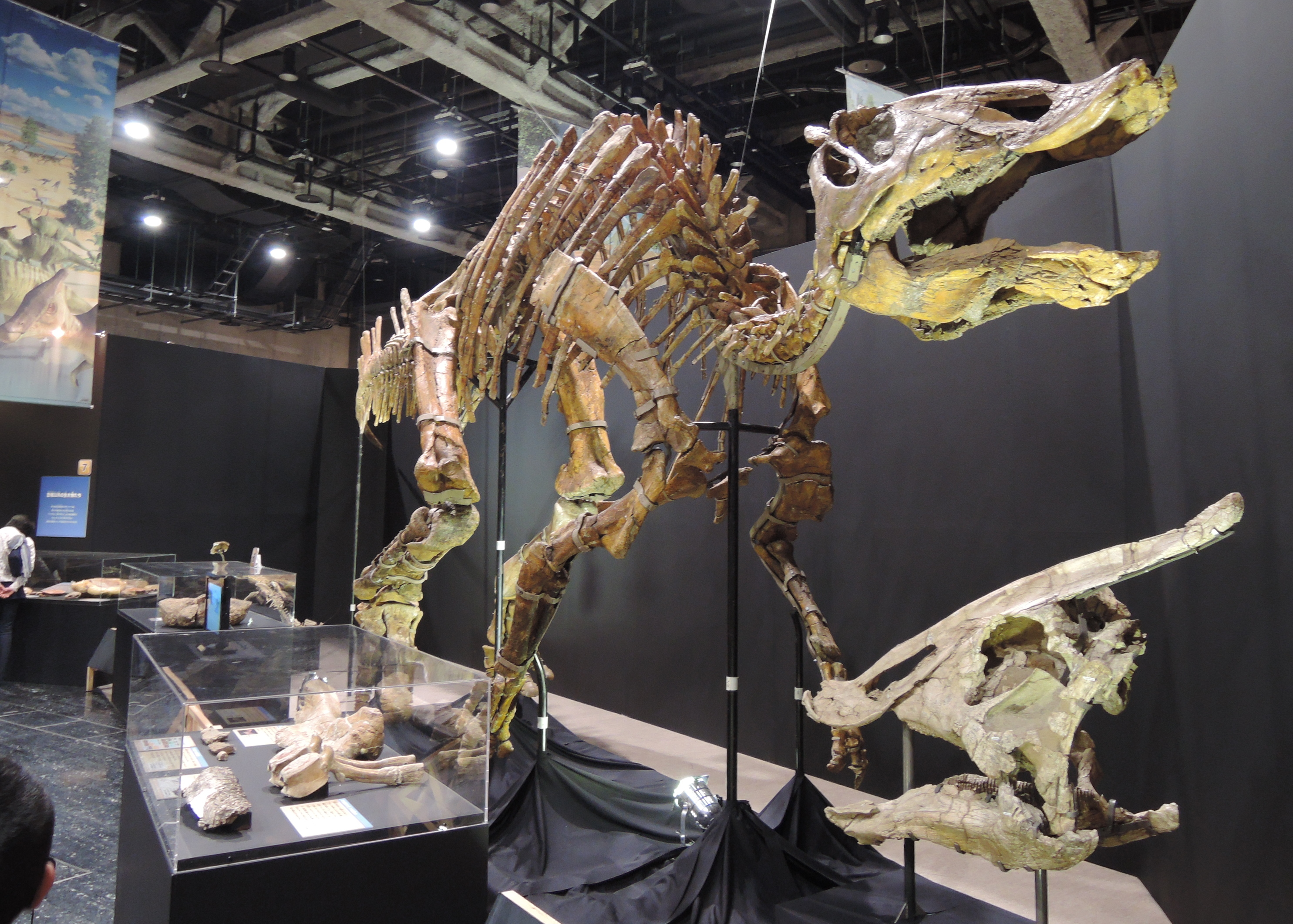
- Mounted S. angustirostris skeleton at Nagoya City Science Museum

Scientific classification
- Kingdom: Animalia
- Phylum: Chordata
- Class: Reptilia
- Clade: Dinosauria
- Clade: †Ornithischia
- Clade: †Ornithopoda
- Family: †Hadrosauridae
- Subfamily: †Saurolophinae
- Tribe: †Saurolophini
- Genus: †Saurolophus; Brown, 1912

Type species
- †Saurolophus osborni Brown, 1912

Other species
- †S. angustirostris Rozhdestvensky, 1952

= Saurolophus =

Saurolophus Temporal range: Late Cretaceous, ~71.5–66 Ma

Hadrosaurid dinosaur genus from the Late Cretaceous period

Saurolophus (/sɔːˈrɒləfəs/; meaning "lizard crest") is a genus of large hadrosaurid dinosaur that lived during the Late Cretaceous period of North America and Asia, in what is now the Horseshoe Canyon and Nemegt formations respectively (about 71.5 to 66 million years ago). It is one of the few dinosaur genera known from multiple continents. The type species, S. osborni, was described by Barnum Brown in 1912 from Canadian fossils. A second valid species, S. angustirostris, is represented by numerous specimens from Mongolia, and was described by Anatoly Konstantinovich Rozhdestvensky. Saurolophus is distinguished by a spike-like crest which projects up and back from the skull. It was a herbivorous dinosaur which could move either bipedally or quadrupedally.

== Discovery and history ==
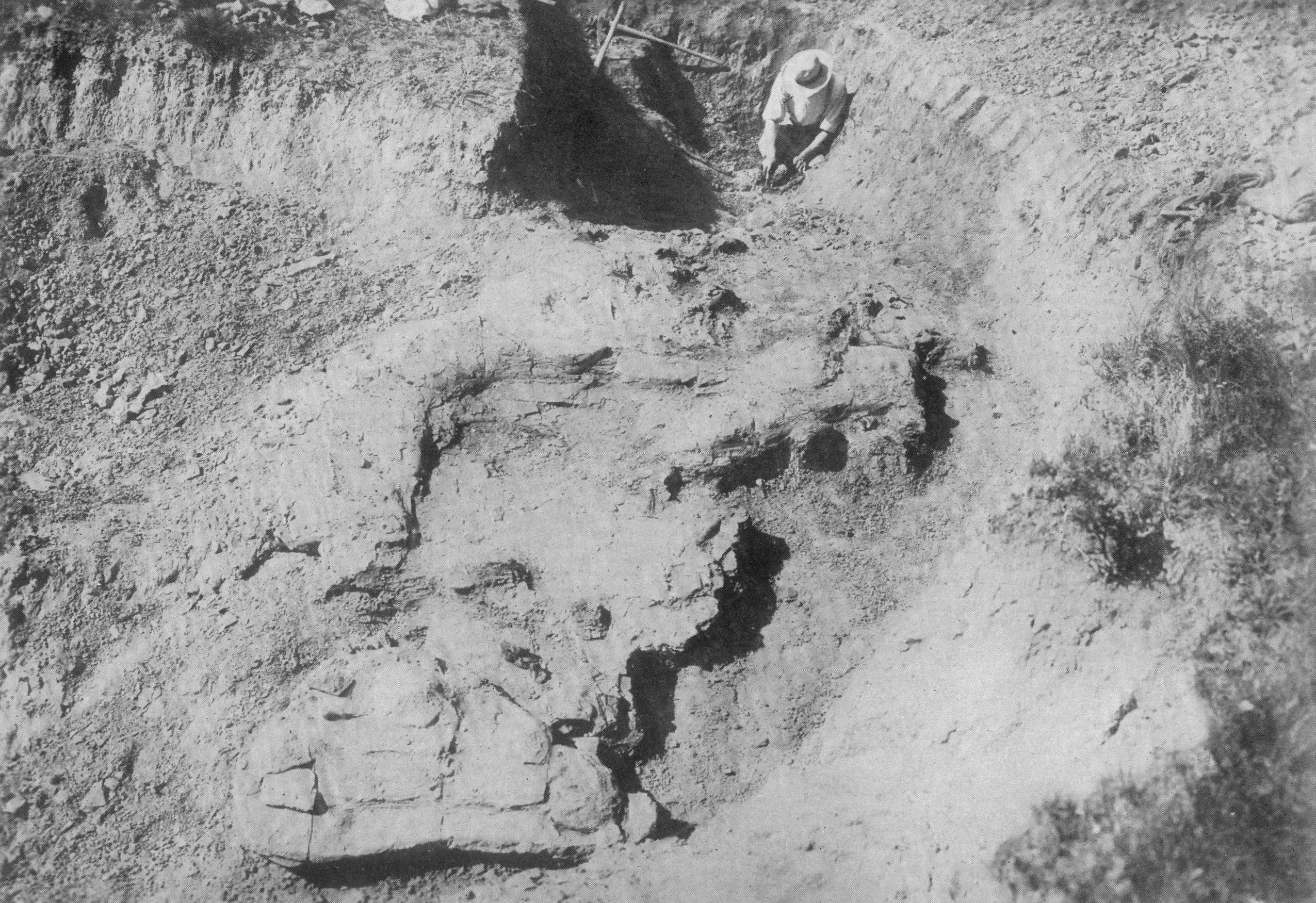
Photo from the excavation of S. osborni in 1911

Barnum Brown recovered the first described remains of Saurolophus in 1911, including a nearly complete skeleton (AMNH 5220). Now on display in the American Museum of Natural History, this skeleton was the first nearly complete dinosaur skeleton from Canada. It was found in rocks of early Maastrichtian age, in the Upper Cretaceous Horseshoe Canyon Formation (then known as the Edmonton Formation) near Tolman Ferry on the Red Deer River in Alberta. Brown wasted little time in describing his material, giving it its own subfamily. Saurolophus was an important early reference for other hadrosaurs, as seen in the names of Prosaurolophus ("before Saurolophus") and Parasaurolophus ("near Saurolophus"). However, little additional material has been recovered and described.

Instead, more abundant remains from Asia have provided more data. Initial remains were not promising; a partial fragmentary ischium from Heilongjiang, China, that Riabinin named S. kryschtofovici. Much better remains were soon recovered, though, but from Mongolia's early Maastrichtian-age Nemegt Formation. The 1946–1949 Russian-Mongolian paleontological expeditions recovered the large skeleton that became S. angustirostris as described by Anatoly Rozhdestvensky. Other skeletons from a variety of growth stages have also been discovered, and S. angustirostris is now the most abundant Asian hadrosaurid.

=== Species ===
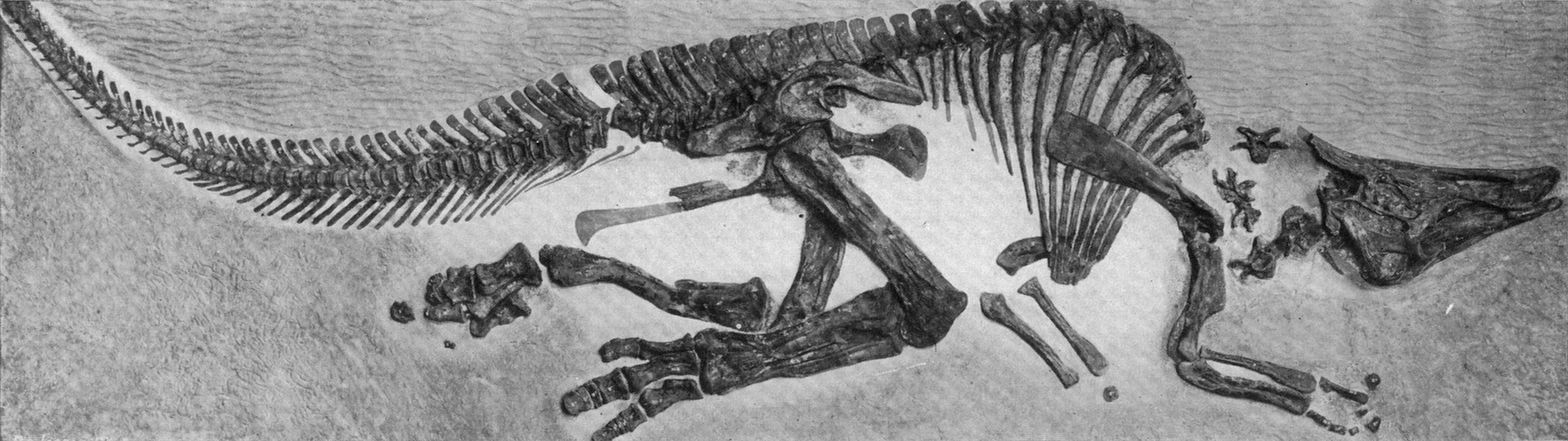
A photograph of the panel mount of the holotype of S. osborni, from Barnum Brown, 1913

Two species are regarded as valid today: the type species S. osborni, and S. angustirostris. S. osborni (Brown, 1912) is known from a skull and skeleton, two other complete skulls, and skull fragments. S. angustirostris (Rozhdestvensky, 1952) is known from at least 15 specimens. It differs from S. osborni by some details of the skull, as well as in the pattern of scales found in skin impressions. The Mongolian species had a longer skull (by 20%) and the front of the snout (the premaxillary bones) were more upwardly directed. S. angustirostris also had a distinctive row of rectangular scales along the midline of the back and tail, known as 'midline feature-scales'; these are not currently preserved in S. osborni. In S. angustirostris, the scales on the tail flank were arranged in vertical patterns, which may have corresponded to striped coloration in life. This area was covered in radial scale patterns in S. osborni, possibly indicating a more mottled or spotted coloration.

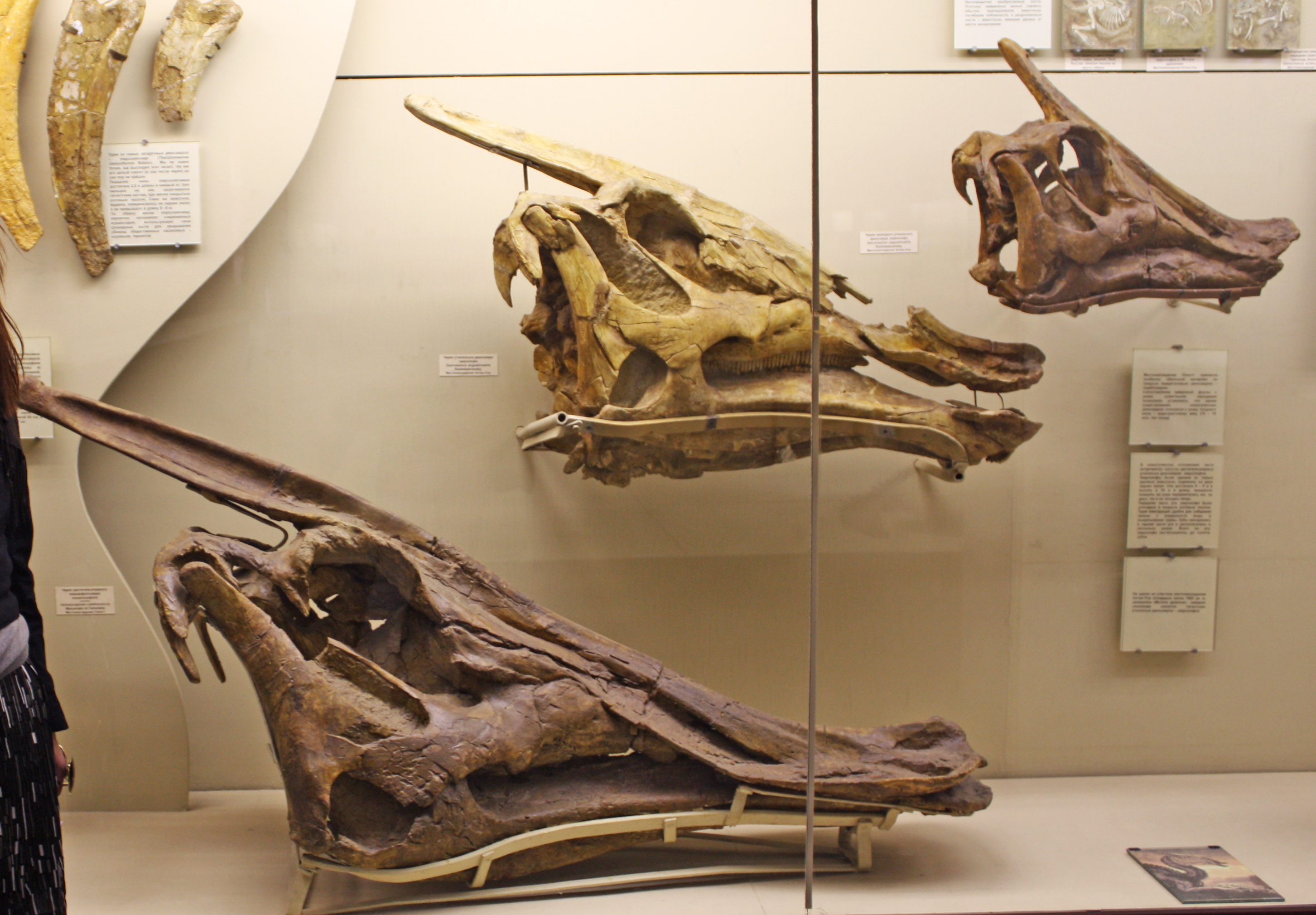
Skulls in Moscow Paleontological Museum

S. kryschtofovici (Riabinin, 1930) is not considered valid; either it is regarded as a dubious name, or as a synonym of S. angustirostris (although the name antedates S. angustirostris).

Until a 2011 reevaluation of the species by Phil R. Bell, S. angustirostris was not well-described. No autapomorphies, unique derived traits, had been established distinguishing it from S. osborni. Bell found in a publication earlier in the year that the two previous studies of S. angustirostris, by Rozhdestvensky in 1952, and Maryanska and Osmolska in 1981, do not provide a comprehensive enough description to compare the species with S. osborni.

In 1939–40, two partial skeletons were found in the late Maastrichtian age Moreno Formation of California. These specimens were referred to cf. Saurolophus sp. In 2010, one of the skulls was instead assigned to Edmontosaurus. A 2013 study placed the two specimens in a new species, S. morrisi. In 2014, the species was reassigned to a new genus, Augustynolophus. Fossils of a possible third species of Saurolophus were unearthed in the Almond Formation in Wyoming by Barnum Brown back in 1937.

== Description ==
The size of the two Saurolophus species compared to humans

Saurolophus is known from material including nearly complete skeletons, giving researchers a clear picture of its bony anatomy. S. osborni, the rarer Albertan species, was around 8.2–8.5 m (27–28 ft) long, with its skull 1.0 m (3.3 ft) long. It has been estimated to have weighed around 3 tonnes (3.0 long tons; 3.3 short tons). The larger Mongolian species S. angustirostris has had its size estimated from 12 m (39 ft) to 13 m (43 ft) long and weighed up to 11 tonnes (11 long tons; 12 short tons). The largest known skull of S. angustirostris measures 1.22 m (4.0 ft) in length. However, S. angustirostris might have grown even bigger, as footprints attributed to it suggest sizes similar to Shantungosaurus. Aside from size, the two species are virtually identical, with differentiation hindered by lack of study.

=== Skull ===
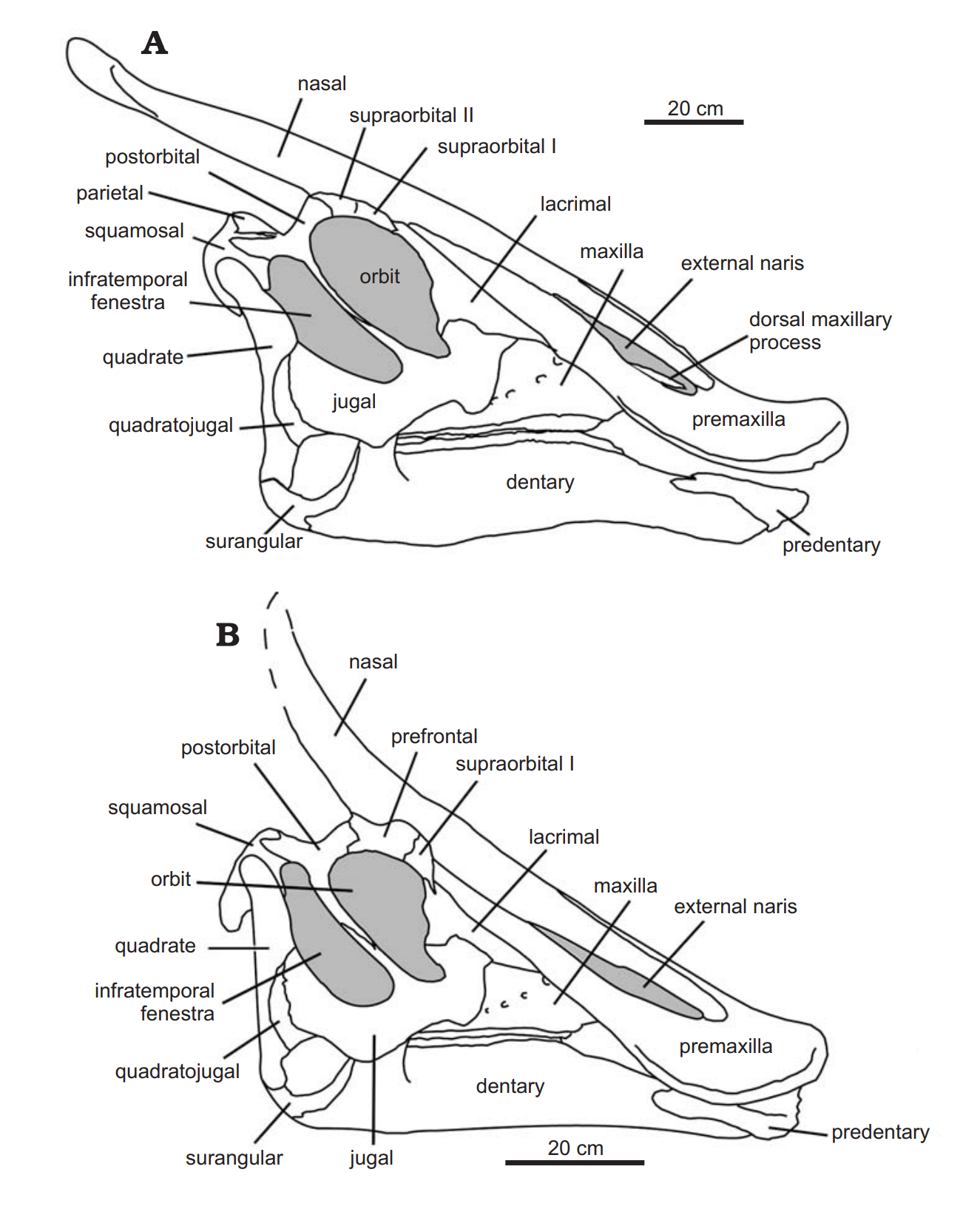
Diagram with labelled skulls of S. angustirostris (A) and S. osborni (B)

The most distinctive feature of Saurolophus is its cranial crest, which is present in young individuals, but is smaller. It is long and spike-like and projects upward and backward at about a 45° angle, starting from over the eyes. This crest is often described as solid, but appears to be solid only at the point, with internal chambers that may have had a respiratory and/or heat-regulation function. The unique crest of Saurolophus is made up almost completely by the nasal bones, and in S. angustirostris it is solid. In adult specimens the crests are a rounded triangular shape in cross section. The crest protrudes past the edge of the skull backwards. Thin processes from the frontals and prefrontals extend along the underside of the crest, probably to strengthen it. At the end of the crest is a swelling of the nasal, which is often termed differently.

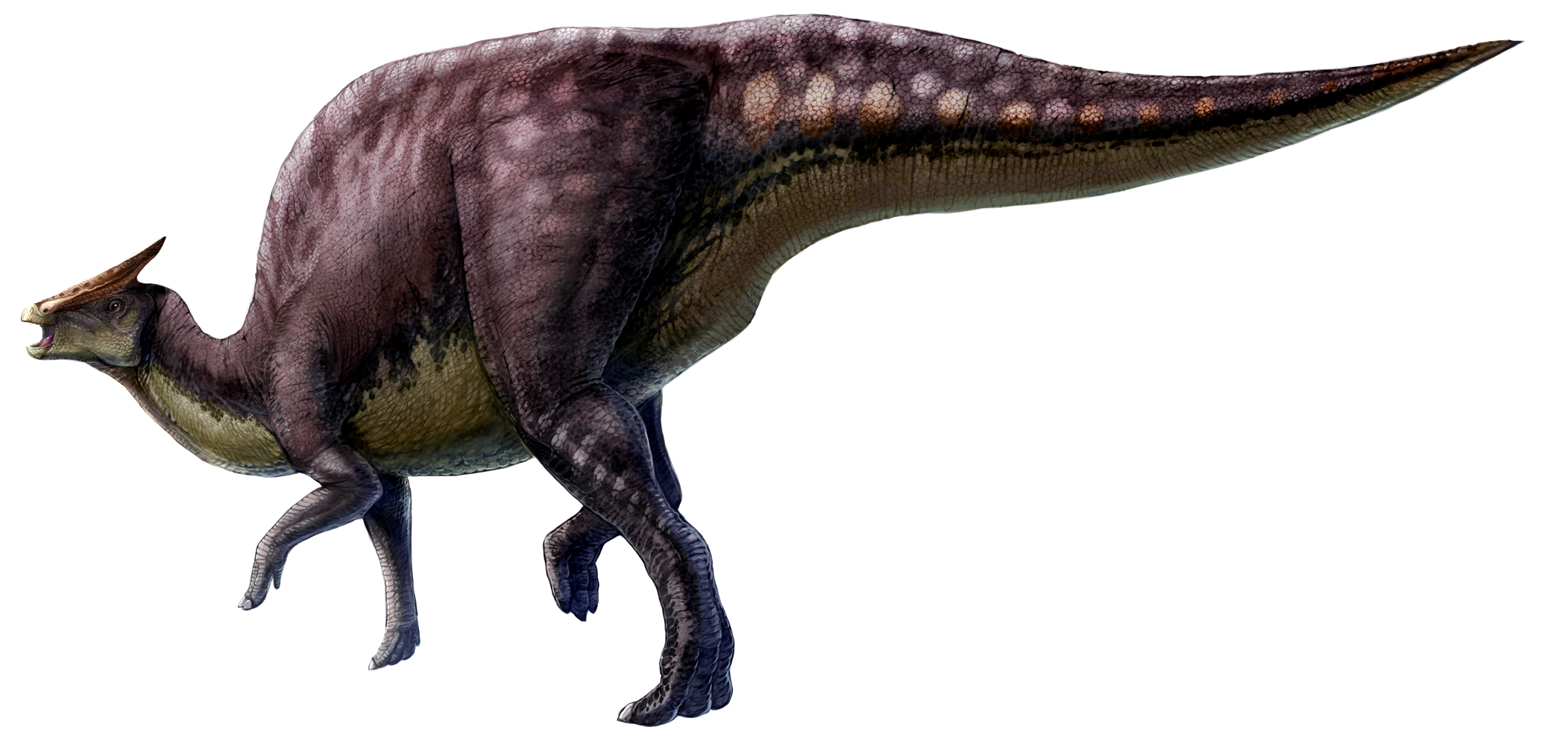
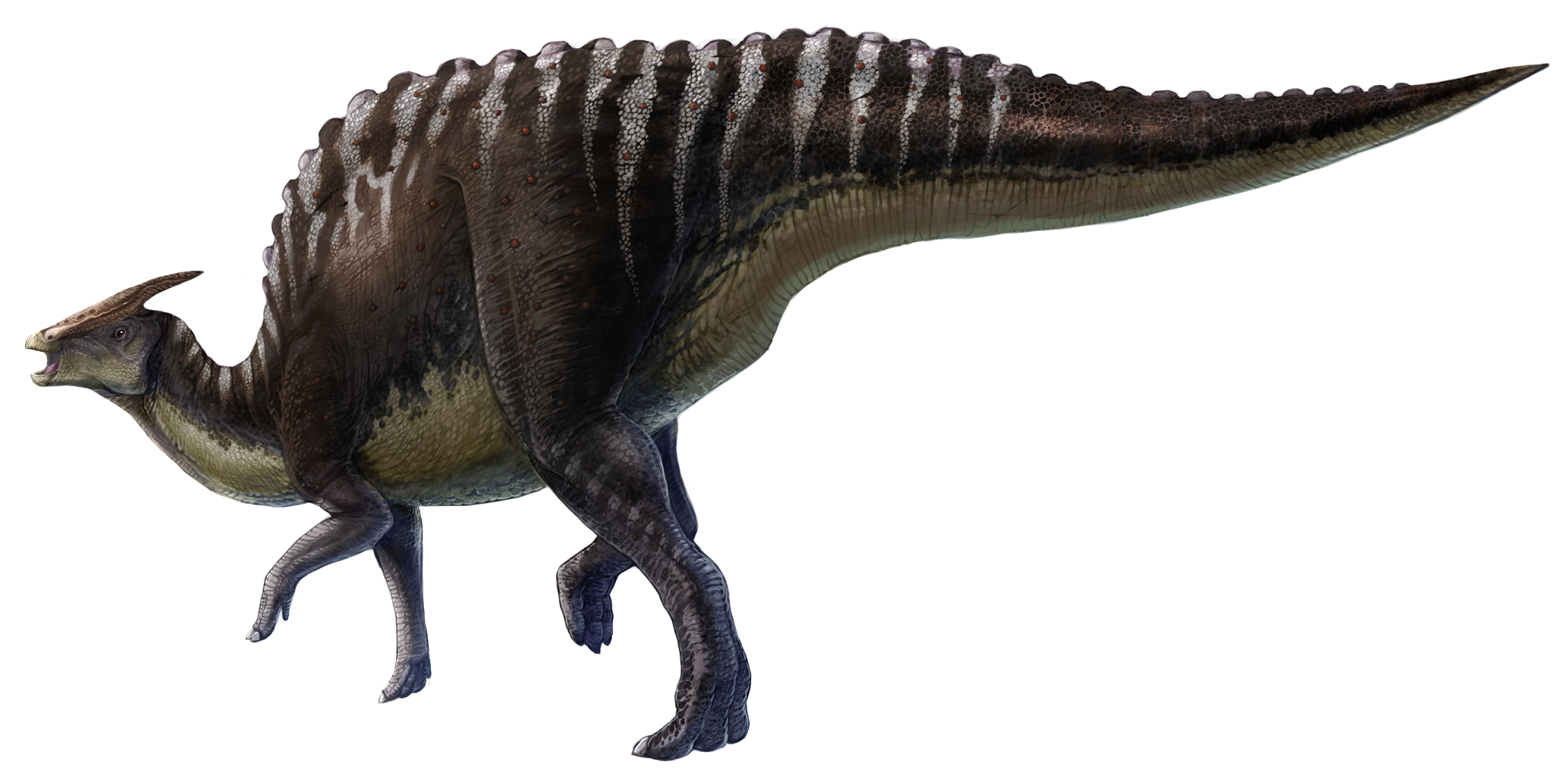
Life restorations of S. osborni (above) and S. angustirostris, showing difference in scalation known from skin-impressions

The holotype of S. angustirostris is a skull and postcrania, so the cranium of the species is well-described. Bell et al. re-evaluated the entire species in a 2011 publication with Acta Palaeontologica Polonica. Their description found the skull to be generalized among hadrosaurines, and are much larger than any skulls of S. osborni. The most unusual feature for a hadrosaurine is the long, protruding, solid crest that extends upwards diagonally from the back of the skull roof. Unlike lambeosaurines, the crests are made up completely of the nasal bone. The premaxilla bones make up almost 50% of the entire skull length, and both sides are filled with small holes. Only in adult individuals has the front of the premaxillary contact been fused. Longer than the premaxilla, the nasal bones are the longest in the skull. They make up the entire length of the crest, and are never preserved as fused.

== Classification ==
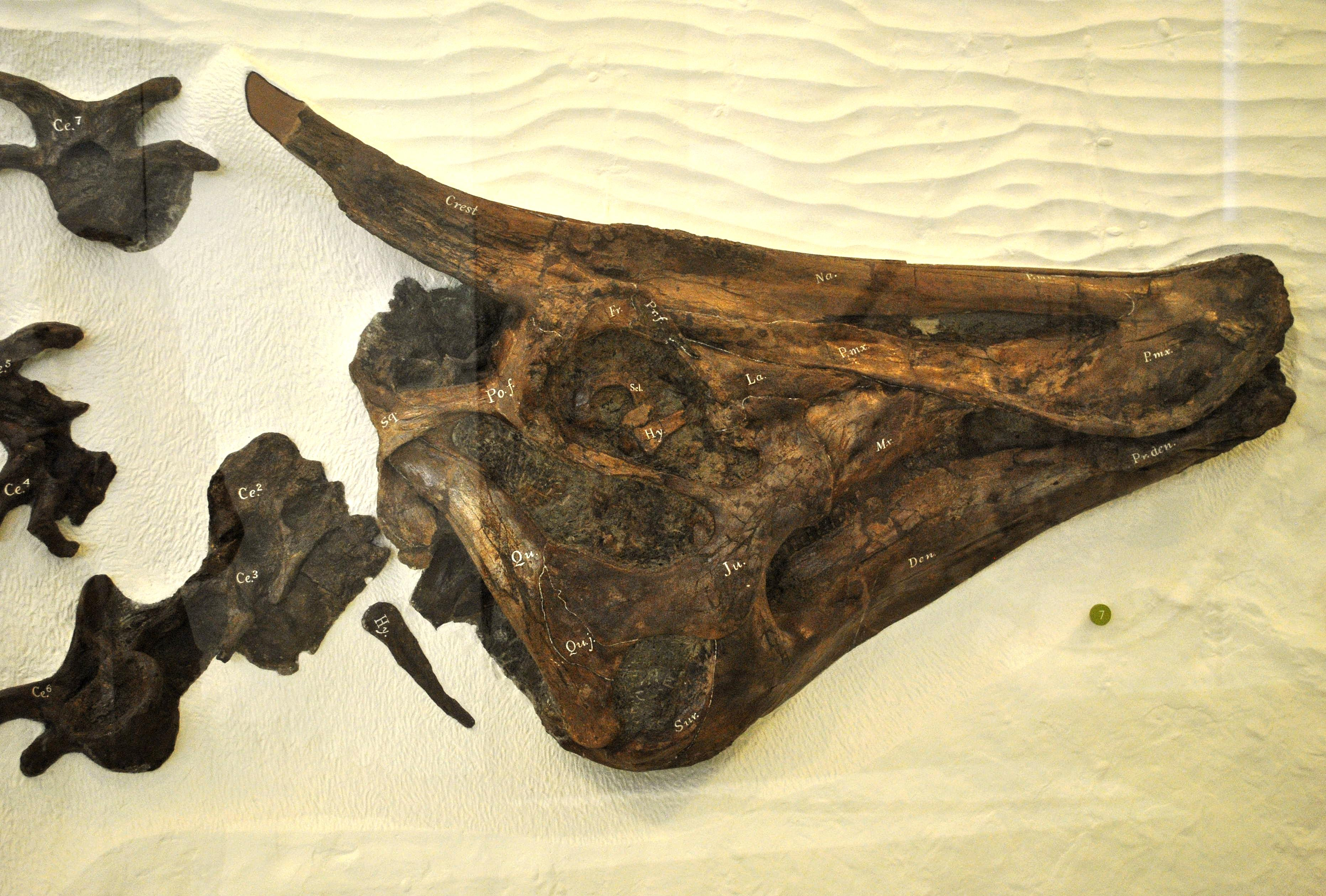
Skull of the holotype specimen of S. osborni

Barnum Brown, who described the first specimens, put it in its own subfamily in "Trachodontidae" (=Hadrosauridae), the Saurolophinae. At the time, this also included Corythosaurus and Hypacrosaurus, the only well-known examples of what would become the Lambeosaurinae. Brown thought that Saurolophus had an expanded tip to the ischium bone in the hip, as dinosaurs now recognized as lambeosaurines had, but this appears to have been based on a mistakenly associated lambeosaurine ischium. Additionally, he misinterpreted the crests of Saurolophus and lambeosaurines as being made of the same bones.

Most publications before 2010 classified Saurolophus as a member of Hadrosaurinae, often known colloquially as the "flat-headed hadrosaurs". In 2010, the subfamily Saurolophinae was brought back into use because Hadrosaurus appears to have branched off prior to the "hadrosaurine"–lambeosaurine split. As a result, Hadrosaurinae by definition cannot include the traditional "hadrosaurines". Saurolophinae is the oldest available name for the former "hadrosaurine" clade. Saurolophus, as the name suggests, is a saurolophine, as it has a saurolophine pelvis and a (largely) solid crest.

The following cladogram of hadrosaurid relationships was published in 2013 by Alberto Prieto-Márquez et al. in Acta Palaeontologica Polonica:

- Saurolophinae
  - Brachylophosaurini
    - Acristravus gagstarsoni
    - - Brachylophosaurus canadensis
      - Maiasaura peeblesorum
  - - Shantungosaurus giganteus
    - - Edmontosaurus
        - Edmontosaurus regalis
        - Edmontosaurus annectens
      - - Saurolophini
          - Kerberosaurus manakini
          - - Sabinas OTU
            - - Prosaurolophus maximus
              - - Saurolophus morrisi (now Augustynolophus)
                - - Saurolophus osborni
                  - Saurolophus angustirostris
        - Kritosaurini
          - Wulagasaurus dongi
          - - Kritosaurus navajovius
            - - - Aquilarhinus
                - - Secernosaurus koerneri
                  - Willinakaqe salitralensis
              - Gryposaurus
                - Gryposaurus latidens
                - - Gryposaurus notabilis
                  - Gryposaurus monumentensis

== Paleobiology ==
=== Feeding ===
As a hadrosaurid, Saurolophus would have been a bipedal/quadrupedal herbivore, eating a variety of plants. Its skull permitted a grinding motion analogous to chewing, and its teeth were continually replacing and packed into dental batteries that contained hundreds of teeth, only a relative handful of which were in use at any time. Plant material would have been cropped by its broad beak, and held in the jaws by a cheek-like organ. Its feeding range would have extended from the ground to about 4 m (13 ft) above.

=== Crest function ===
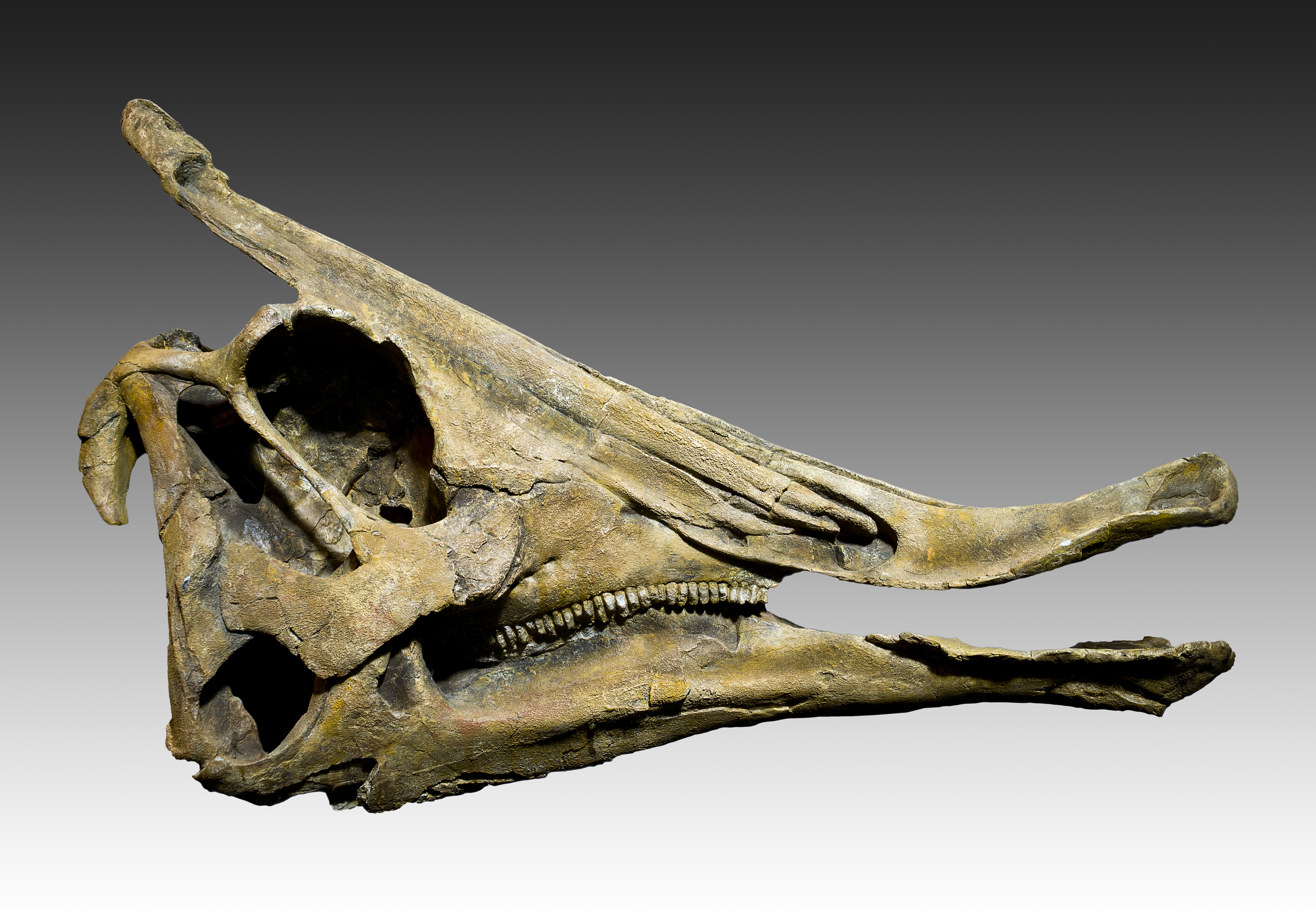
Skull of S. angustirostris

The distinctive spike-like crest of Saurolophus has been interpreted in multiple ways, and could have had multiple functions. Brown compared it to the crest of a chameleon, and suggested it could provide an area for muscle attachment and a connection point for a nonbody back frill like that seen in the basilisk lizard. Peter Dodson interpreted similar features in other duckbills as having use in sexual identification. Maryańska and Osmólska, noting the hollow base, suggested that the crest increased the surface area of the respiratory cavity, and helped in thermoregulation. James Hopson supported a function as a visual signal, and further mentioned the possibility that the inflatable skin flaps over the nostrils could have acted as resonators and additional visual signals. This idea has been picked up by authors of popular dinosaur works, such as David B. Norman, who discussed hadrosaurid display at length and included a life restoration of such an adaptation in action.

=== Ontogeny ===
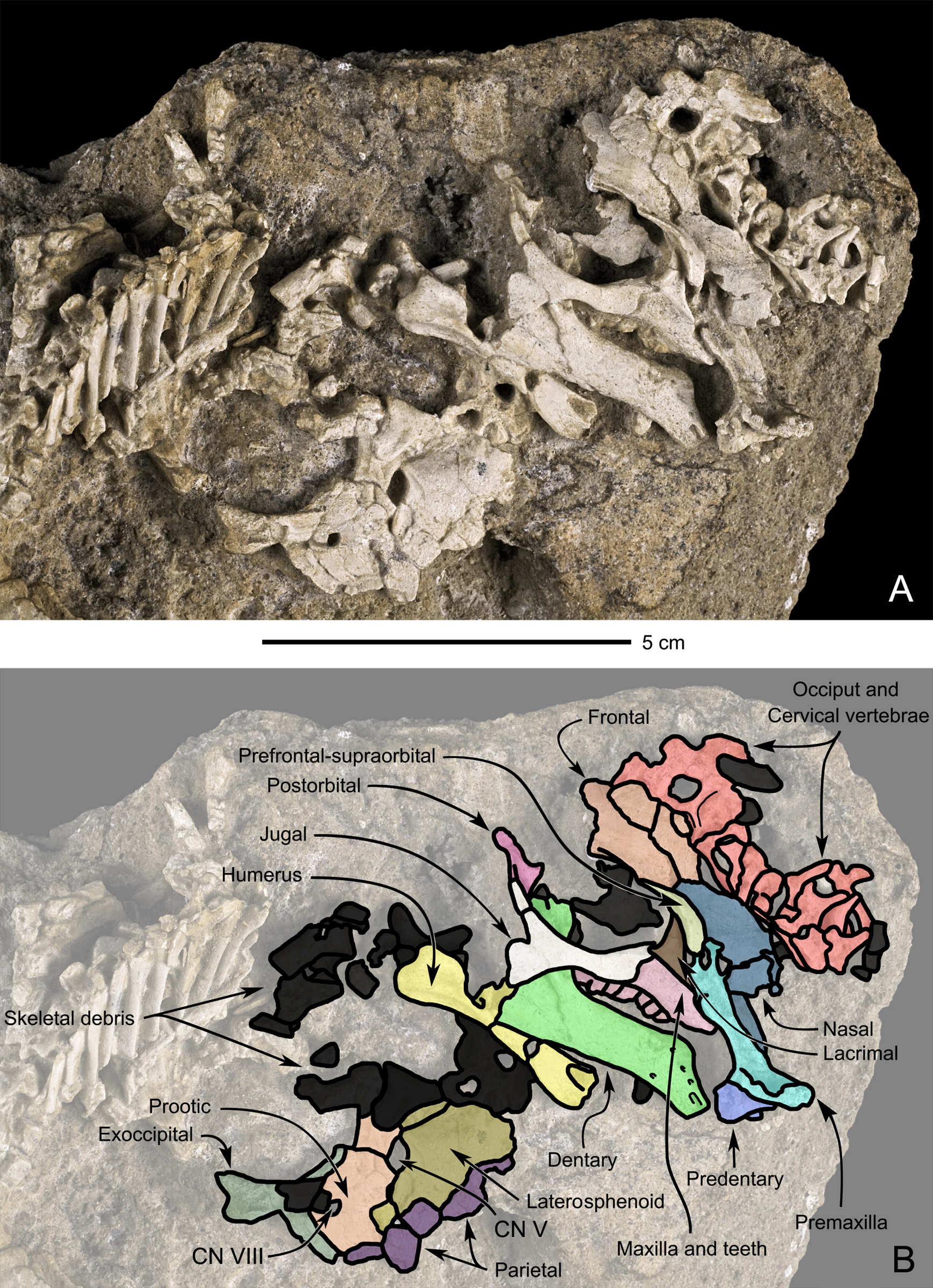
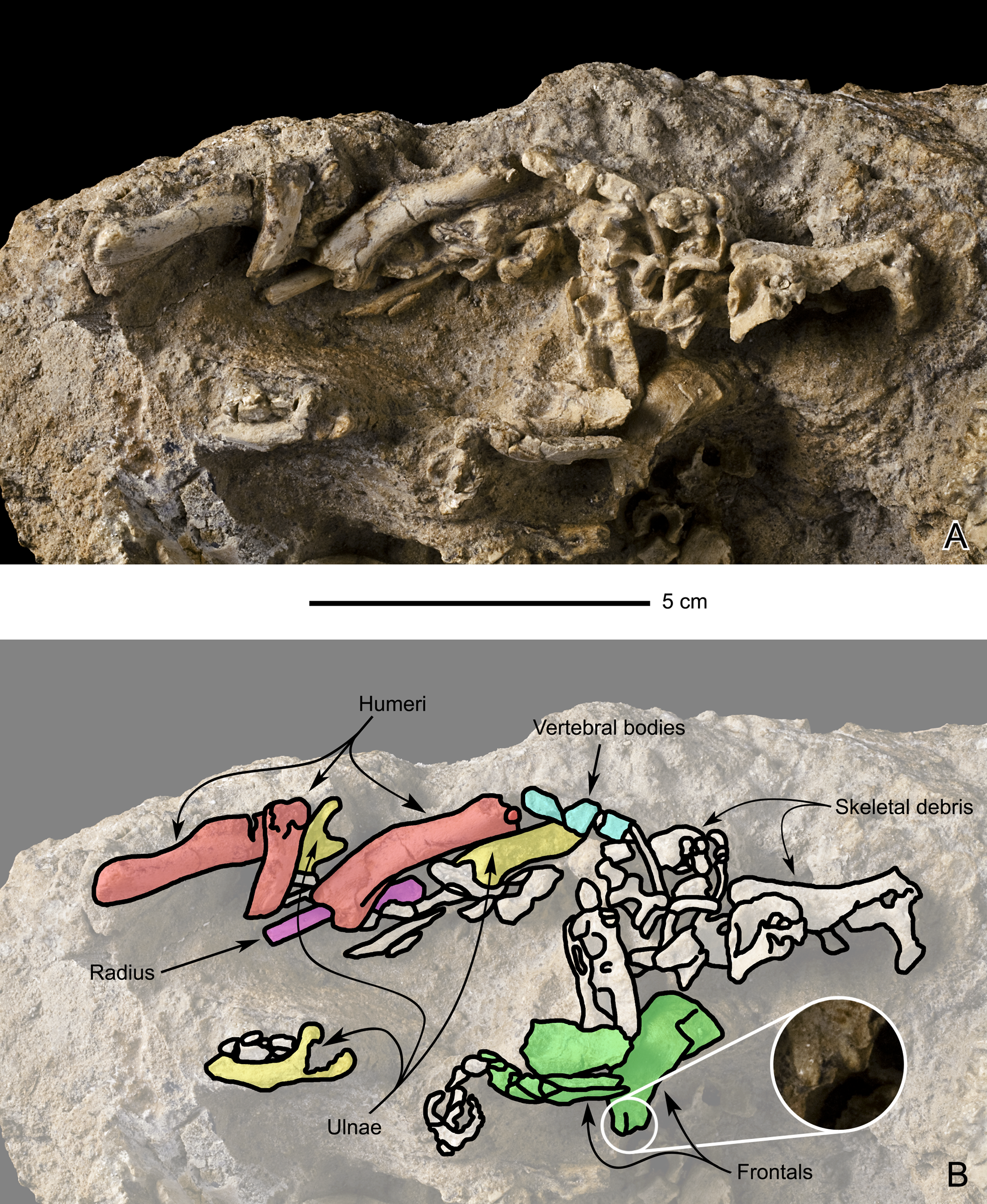
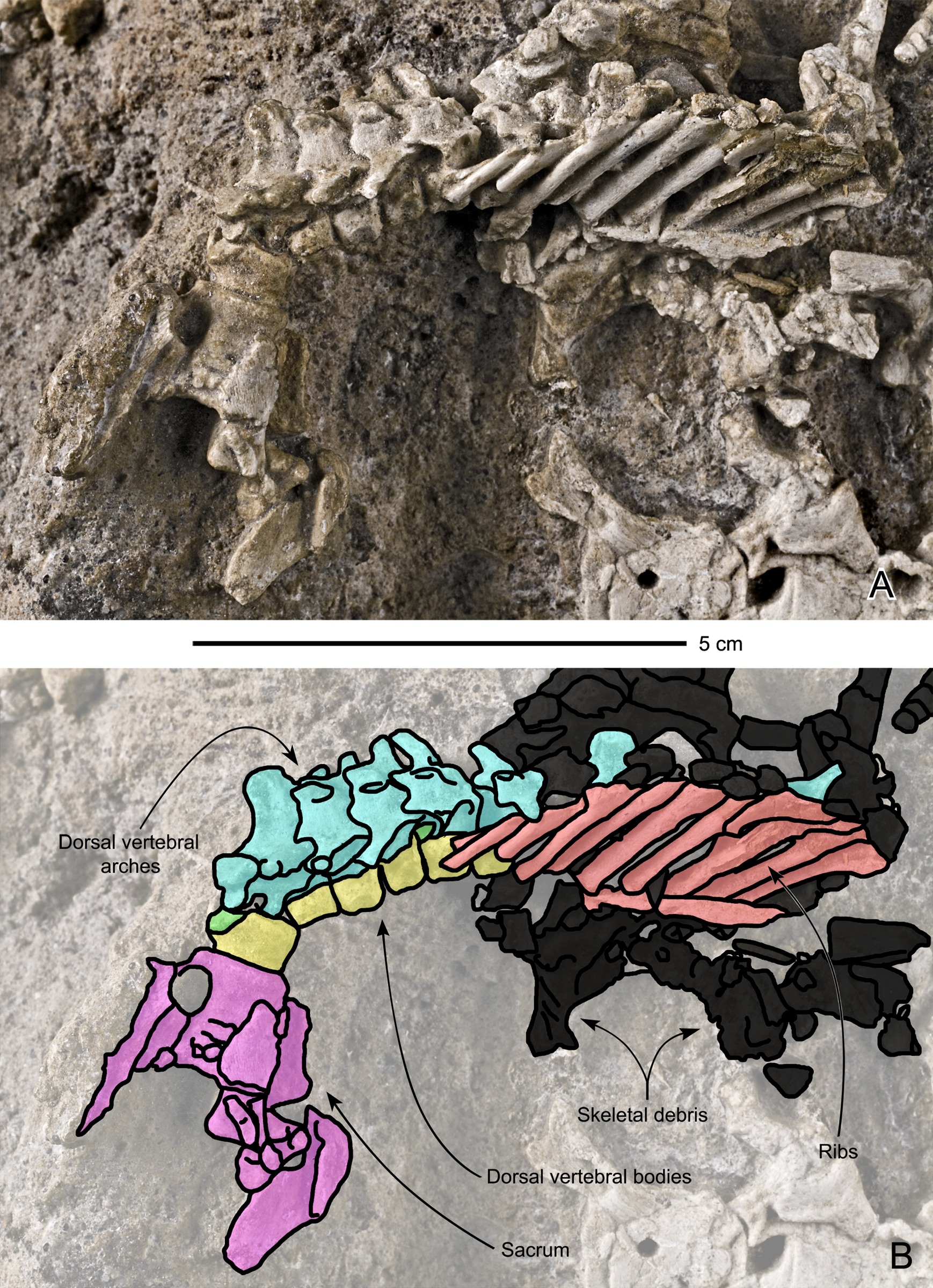
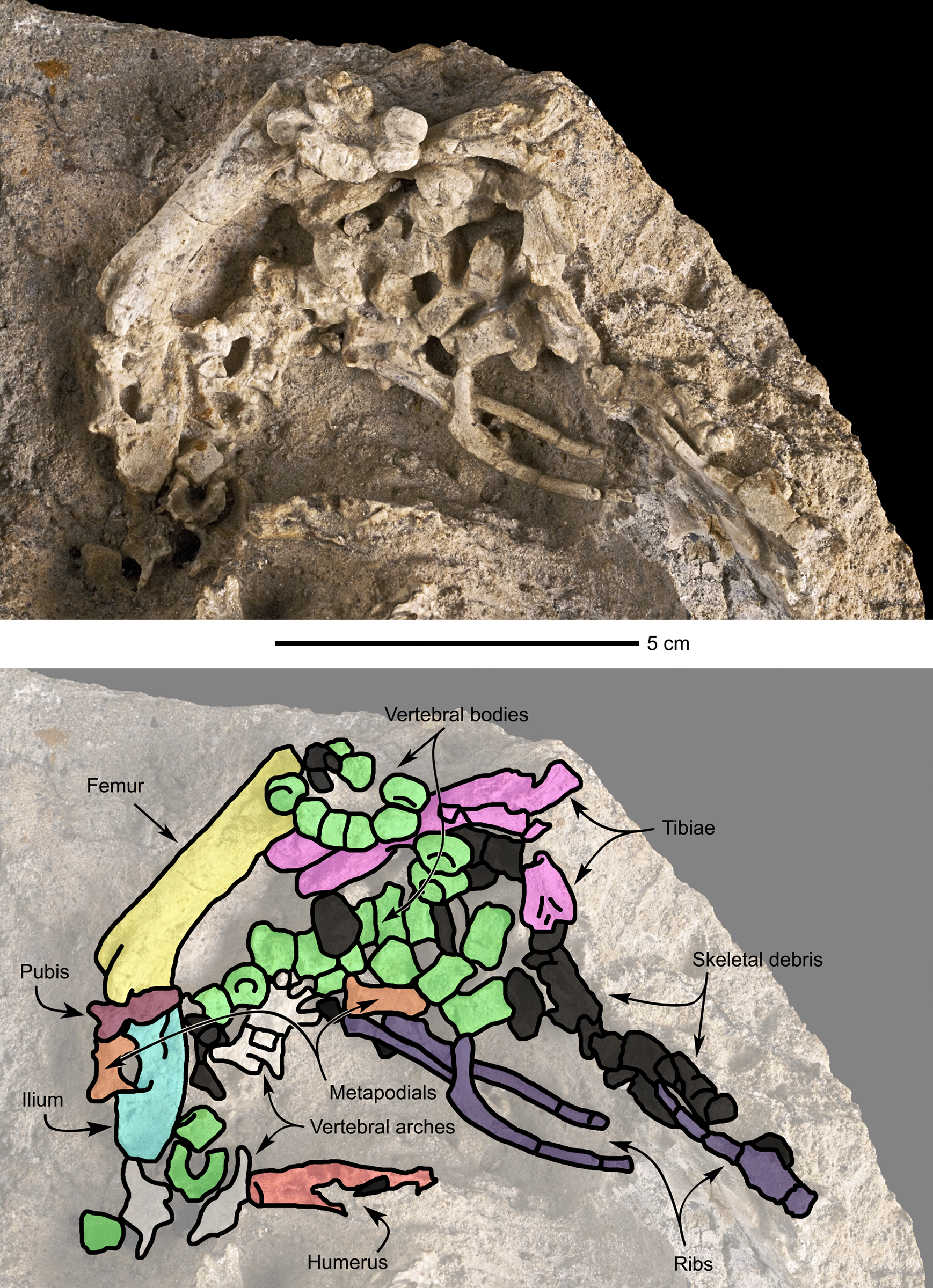
Highlited juvenile remains from block MPC-D 100/764, representing possibly four individuals

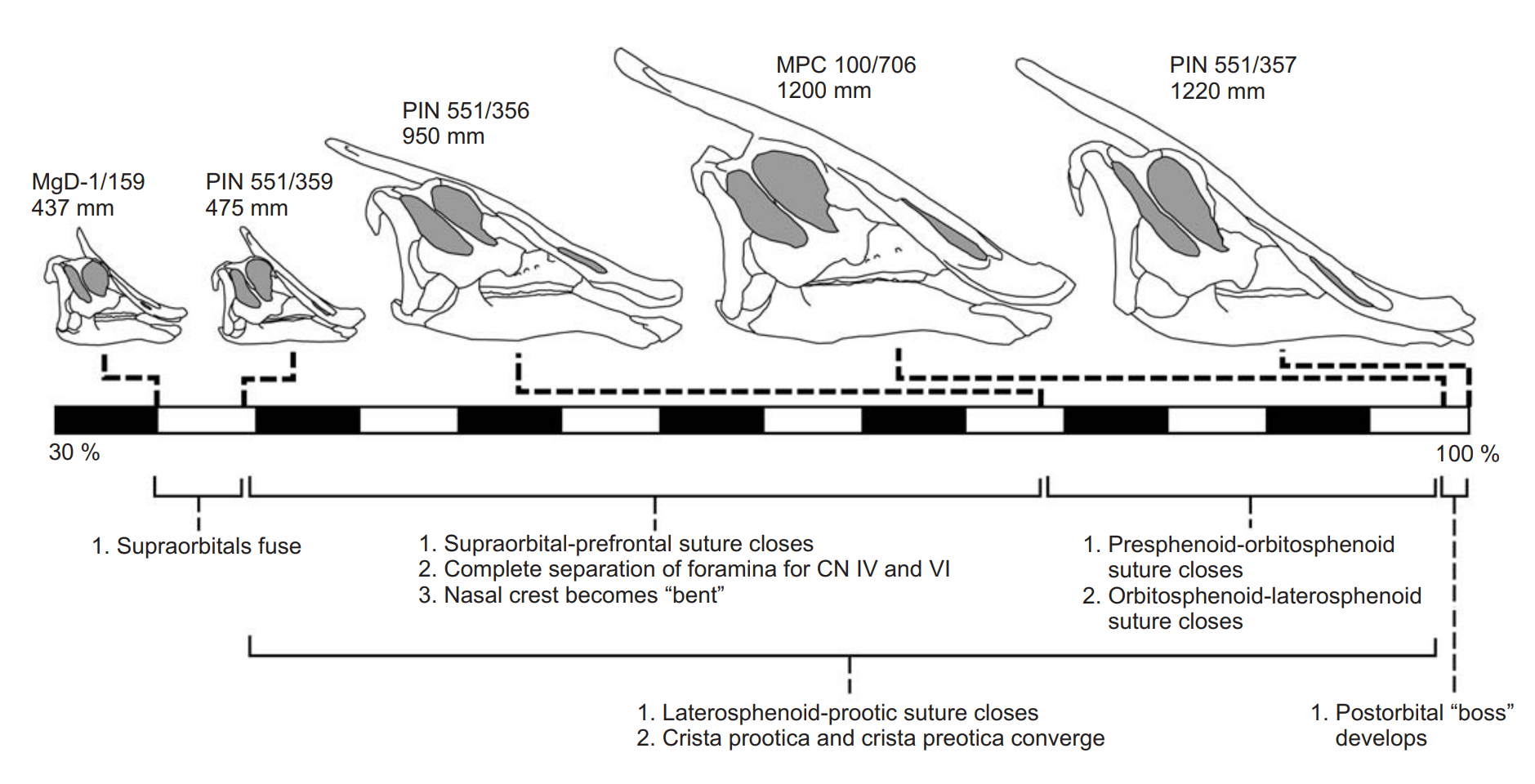
Cranial ontogeny of S. angustirostris

In 2015 Leonard Dewaele and colleagues described a small and partial nest containing several juveniles of S. angustirostris. The specimen (MPC-D 100/764) was recovered from the notorious Dragon's Tomb assambleage of the Nemegt Formation. The team noted that among remains, three or even four juveniles can be recognized, and two fragmentary eggshells were found in association. Juveniles within this block were identified as perinates, as they had skull lengths less than five percent of the length of the skulls of the adults, indicating they were in the earliest developmental stage at the time of their deaths. Based on these juveniles, Dewaele and team indicated that during the ontogeny of S. angustirostris the distinct crest found in adults was poorly developed in infancy, the snout grew proportionally longer, the orbit became more oval-shaped, the doming of the frontal became less prominent, and the coronoid process became higher.

=== Social behavior ===
Bell and team in 2018 described the famous Dragon's Tomb assambleage of the Altan Uul II locality, Nemegt Formation, which contains a large-sized bonebed of S. angustirostris. This bonebed is largely monodominant (one dominant species), with at least three size-classes (juveniles, subadults, and adults) of S. angustirostris. Examinations made to Dragon's Tomb suggest that at least 21 Saurolophus individuals can be currently found. The team indicated that this bonebed has a minimum size of about 2000 m2, which suggest that over 100 Saurolophus carcasses may have contributed to the event. However, they discussed that even though evidence clearly reflects a catastrophic mass-mortality of a social group of S. angustirostris and provide the first evidence of gregariousness in this taxon, the exact conditions and cause surrounding the group death can not be determined. Bell and team also noted that while Dragon's Tomb provides direct evidence for social behaviour in S. angustirostris, there is yet no evidence for it in S. osborni. Nevertheless, gregariousness is apparently widespread in hadrosaurines.

=== Paleopathology ===
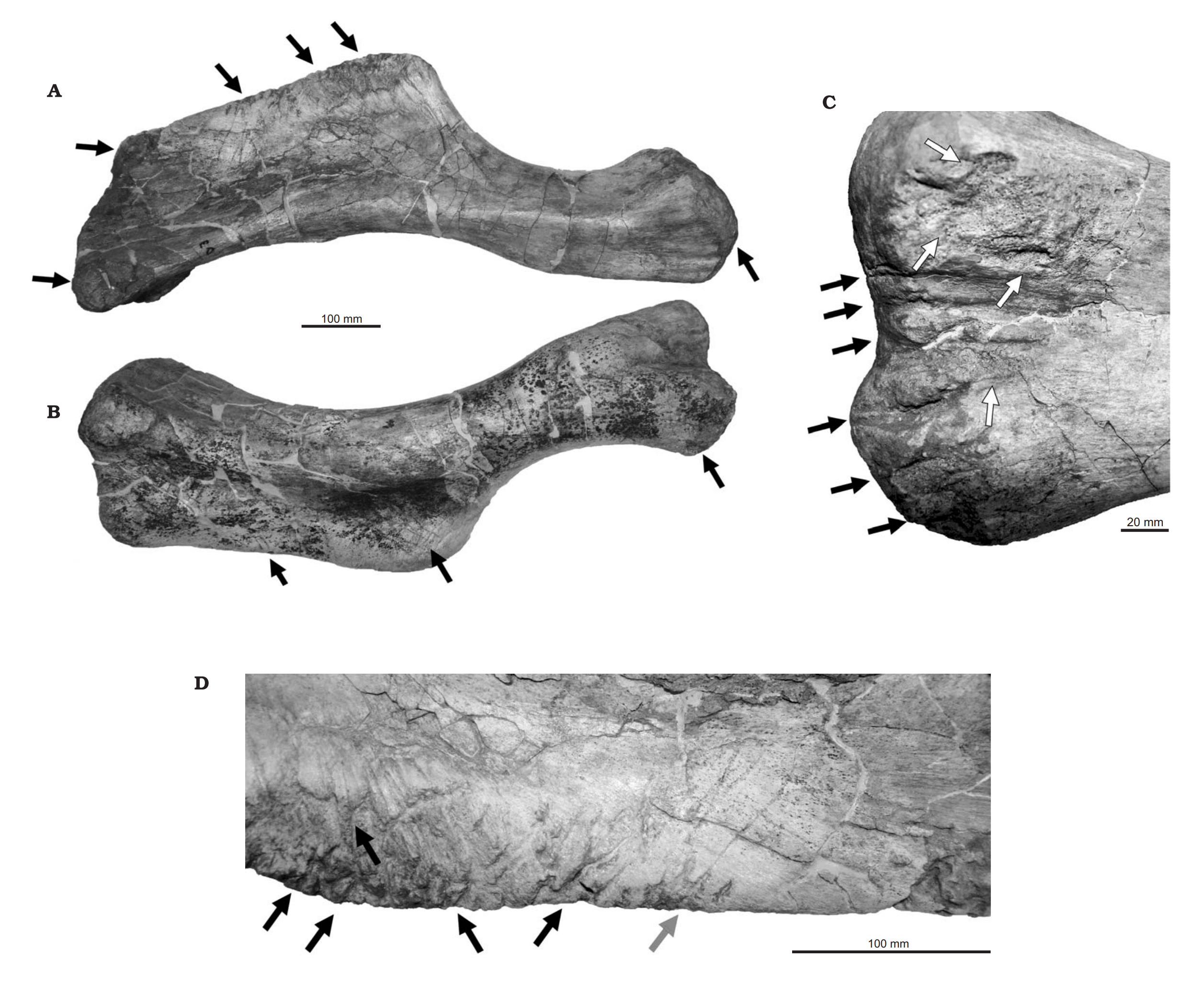
Left humerus of S. angustirostris MPC-D 100/764, showing multiple bite marks

David W.E. Hone and Mahito Watabe in 2011 reported the left humerus of a nearly complete S. angustirostris skeleton (MPC-D 100/764) from the Bügiin Tsav locality of the Nemegt Formation, which was heavily damaged from bite marks attributed to the sympatric Tarbosaurus. As suggested by the lack of damage to the rest of the skeleton (such as large wounds in skeletal remains indicative of predation), this tyrannosaurid was likely scavenging an already dead S. angustirostris. It is unlikely that a large-bodied predator such as Tarbosaurus would have left sparse feeding traces on a single humerus having an entire carcass to feed on. The humerus shows three distinctive feeding methods, interpreted as punctures, drag marks, and bite−and−drag marks. Hone and Watabe noted that bite marks were mostly located at the deltopectoral crest, suggesting that this Tarbosaurus was actively selecting which biting style employ to scavenge the bone.

=== Daily activity ===
Comparisons between the scleral rings of Saurolophus and modern birds and reptiles suggest that it may have been cathemeral, active throughout the day at short intervals.

== Paleoenvironment ==
=== Horseshoe Canyon Formation ===
S. osborni is known only from the upper part (unit 4) of the Horseshoe Canyon Formation. The formation is interpreted as having a significant marine influence, due to an encroaching Western Interior Seaway, the shallow sea that covered the midsection of North America through much of the Cretaceous. S. osborni may have preferred to stay inland. It lived alongside other dinosaur species including the ornithopods Hypacrosaurus altispinus and Parksosaurus warreni, ankylosaurid Anodontosaurus lambei, pachycephalosaurid Sphaerotholus edmontonense, ornithomimids Dromiceiomimus brevitertius and an unnamed species of Struthiomimus, small theropods including Atrociraptor marshalli and Albertonykus borealis, and the tyrannosaurid Albertosaurus sarcophagus. The dinosaurs from this formation form part of the Edmontonian land vertebrate age. A 2001 study suggested that Saurolophus osborni was part of a distinct inland fauna characterized by an association between Anchiceratops ornatus and it, while the contemporary coastal fauna was characterized by the association of Pachyrhinosaurus canadensis and Edmontosaurus regalis. However, the association between S. osborni and Anchiceratops was later noted to be in error, Anchiceratops only occurs lower in the Horseshoe Canyon Formation, before the major transgression of the Western Interior Seaway represented by the Drumheller Marine Tongue.

=== Nemegt Formation ===
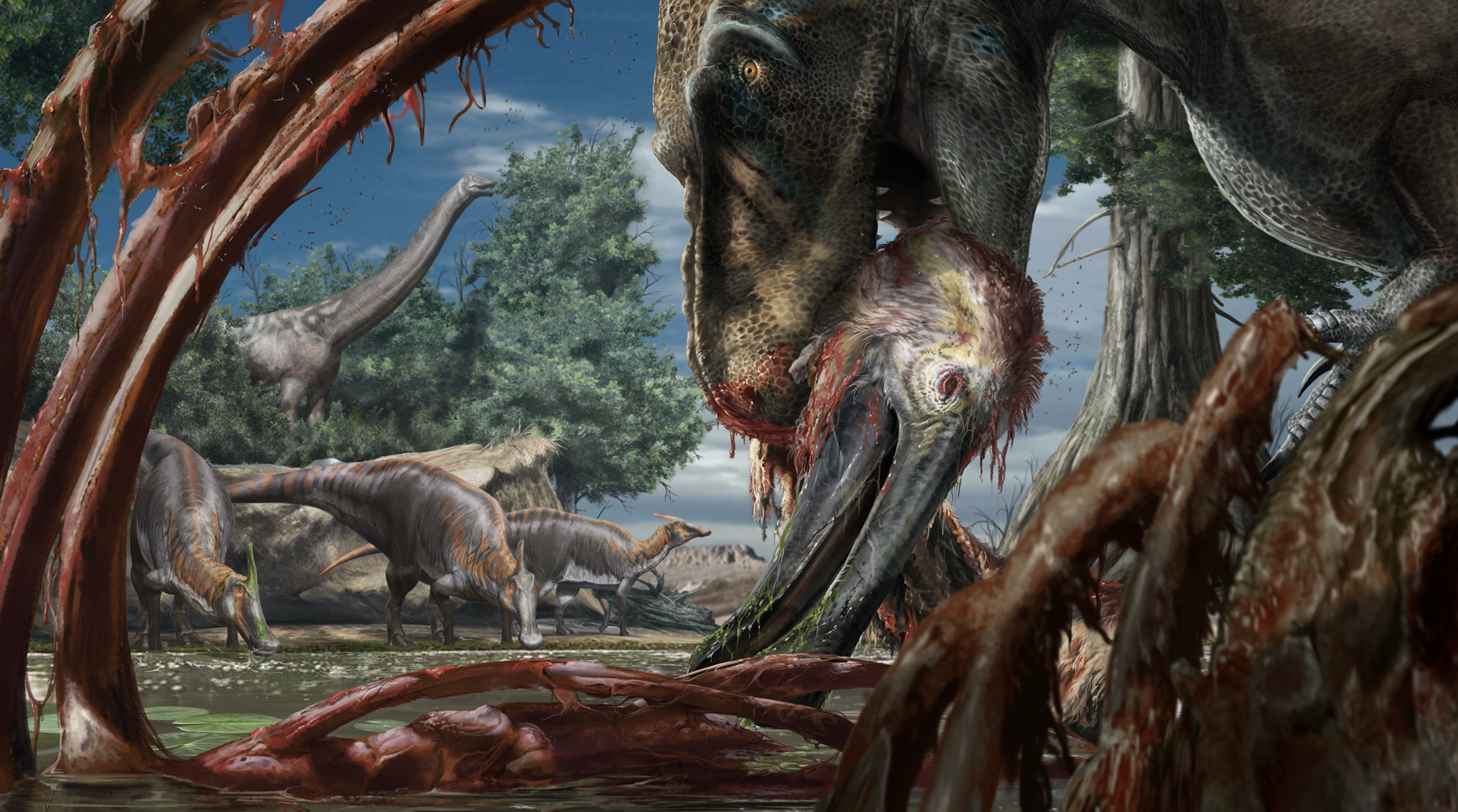
Restoration of Tarbosaurus feeding on Deinocheirus, with S. angustirostris drinking in the background

S. angustirostris was one of the largest herbivores of the Nemegt Formation, which lacked large ceratopsians, but had sauropods and a more diverse theropod fauna. Unlike other Mongolian formations like the well-known Djadochta Formation that includes Velociraptor and Protoceratops, the Nemegt is interpreted as being a well-watered region, like the Dinosaur Park Formation in Alberta. When examined, the rock facies of the Nemegt formation suggest the presence of stream and river channels, mudflats, and shallow lakes. Sediments also indicate that a rich habitat existed, offering diverse food in abundant amounts that could sustain Cretaceous dinosaurs. It coexisted with the rare hadrosaurid Barsboldia, flat-headed pachycephalosaurian Homalocephale and domed Prenocephale, the large ankylosaurid Saichania, rare titanosaurs sauropods Nemegtosaurus and Opisthocoelicaudia, the alvarezsaurid Mononykus, three types of troodontids including Zanabazar, several oviraptorosaurians including Rinchenia and Nemegtomaia, the ornithomimosaurs Anserimimus and Gallimimus, and the giant theropods Deinocheirus and Therizinosaurus, including the tyrannosaurid Tarbosaurus.

The area would have been semi-arid during certain times of the year. The environment was likely dominated by Araucarian conifer forests, which also contained ginkgos, reed grasses, fagalean trees, cycad-like plants, sycamores (plane trees), bald cypresses, katsura relatives, pondweeds, tupelos, duckweeds, lotuses, and sedges.

S. angustirostris was common, and would have been an important large herbivore in the Nemegt Formation. By comparison, S. osborni was rare in the Horseshoe Canyon Formation, and faced competition from other duckbills (genus Hypacrosaurus).

== See also ==
- Timeline of hadrosaur research
