= Joshua Hoffet =

Josué Hoffet
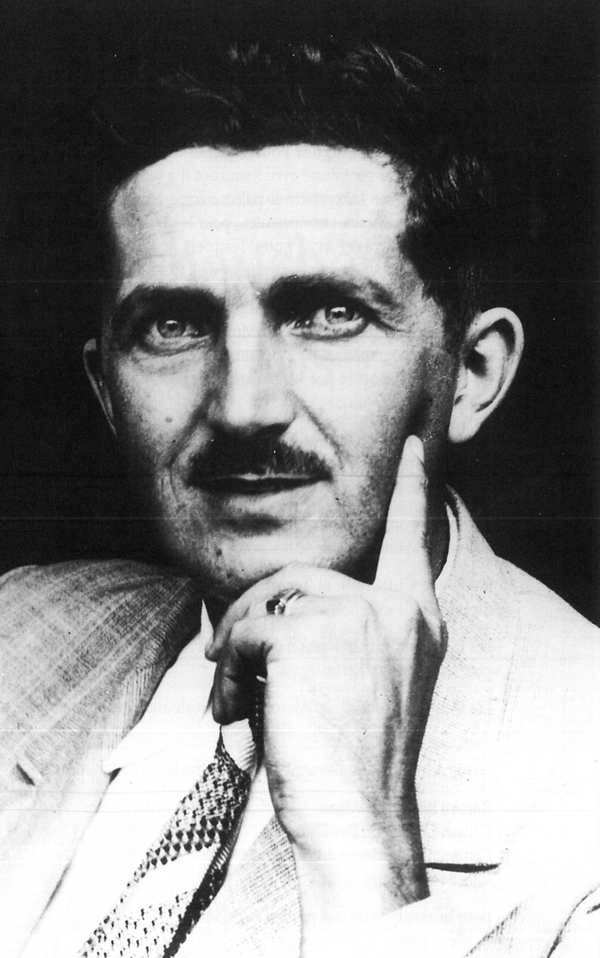
- Born: Josué-Heilman Hoffet; 5 May 1901; Courcelles-Chaussy, France
- Died: disappeared 21 April 1945 (aged 43) declared dead 1947 (aged 45 to 46) disappeared in the Nui Tho Pass, near Hanoi, Vietnam
- Cause of death: Killed in action (presumed)
- Education: University of Nancy
- Known for: Discovering the first dinosaur fossils in Laos
- Spouses: Marguerite Mathilde Denny (died 1929); Alice Braun (m. 1933)
- Children: 4
- Scientific career
- Fields: Geology; Paleontology
- Workplaces: Geology and Paleontology of Laos
- Thesis: Geological study of central Indochina between Tourane and the Mekong (central Annam and Lower Laos) (1933)
- Academic advisors: Paul Fallot

Josué Hoffet, born Josué-Heilman Hoffet, (Note: Heilmann is the surname of his grandmother Catherine Heilmann, daughter of the industrialist Josué Heilmann (1796–1848)) (5 May 1901 – disappeared 21 April 1945) was a French palaeontologist best remembered for his expeditions to Laos, which discovered the first known remains of dinosaurs in the country, which belonged to what is now known as Tangvayosaurus.

== Biography ==
Josué-Heilman Hoffet was born on 5 May 1901 and his brother Frédéric, akin to their father Charles-Frédéric (1860–1928), became a pastor, while Josué Hoffet was sent to be a carpenter's apprentice. He disliked the job and instead decided to pursue a career in the natural sciences (specifically palaeontology and geology) and he earned a graduate degree at the University of Nancy under the mentorship of Paul Fallot.

In order to undertake his thesis, he joined the Geology and Paleontology of Laos in 1927 and he moved to French Indochina with his first wife Marguerite Mathilde Denny; she died in 1929. Hoffet returned to France in 1932, defended his thesis in 1933 and received a prize from the Paris Academy of Sciences. He also married his second wife, Alice Braun (1911–2004), in 1933; the couple had four children: Anne-Line, Marie-Eve, Jean-Fred and Catherine.

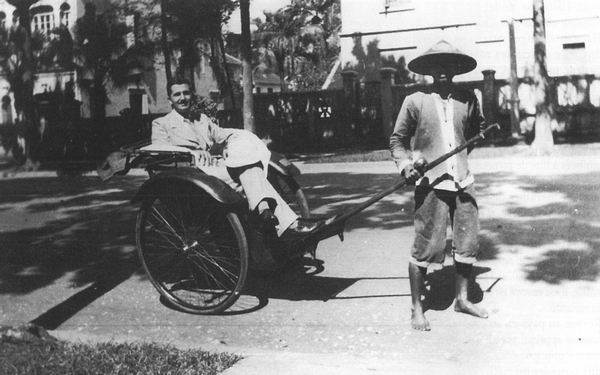
Hoffet (left) during his time in Laos, c. 1930s

In 1936, he became the first to find dinosaur fossils in Laos while mapping the Grès supérieurs Formation at Bas-Laos, Tang Vay in search of hydrocarbons. At the time, he accidentally discovered dinosaur, turtle and crocodyliform fossils.

Based on these remains, he named the species Titanosaurus falloti in 1942 and Mandchurosaurus laosensis in 1944.

When the Japanese occupied Laos during the Second World War, Hoffet was mobilised and stationed in Huế, Vietnam. On 21 April 1945, Hoffet went missing in action at the Nui Tho Pass near Hanoi and he was declared dead in absentia in 1947. It is believed that he was killed with a machete shortly after he disappeared; in 1992, a commemorative plaque was installed in the area he likely died.
