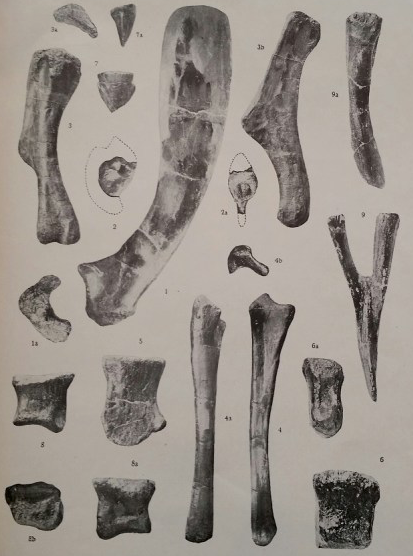
- Holotype specimen of M. amurensis

Scientific classification
- Kingdom: Animalia
- Phylum: Chordata
- Class: Reptilia
- Clade: Dinosauria
- Clade: †Ornithischia
- Clade: †Ornithopoda
- Family: †Hadrosauridae
- Genus: †Mandschurosaurus; Riabinin, 1930

Type species
- †Mandschurosaurus amurensis Riabinin, 1925

Species
- †M. amurensis (Riabinin, 1925); †M. laosensis? Hoffet, 1944

Synonyms
- Manschurosaurus (sic); Trachodon amurense Riabinin, 1925

= Mandschurosaurus =

Mandschurosaurus Temporal range: Late Cretaceous, ~72–66 Ma

Extinct genus of dinosaurs

Mandschurosaurus (meaning "lizard from Manchuria") is an extinct genus of hadrosaurids based on material from the Late Cretaceous of China and possibly also the Early Cretaceous of Laos. It was the first dinosaur genus named from China.

== Discovery and naming ==
The holotype of M. amurensis (IVP AS coll.), the only valid species within the genus, is based on a poorly preserved and incomplete skeleton collected by Russian scientists in 1914 from the banks of the Amur River, China in a layer of the Maastrichtian-aged Yuliangze Formation and the remains represent a large hadrosaurid. The holotype material was initially referred to the genus Trachodon (a nomen dubium) as T. amurense by Riabinin (1925), but was later reassigned to a new genus by Riabinin (1930).

The holotype of M. laosensis, which is based mainly on an ilium and other fragmentary remains, comes from the Aptian-Albian-aged Grès supérieurs Formation in Laos and was named by Hoffet (1944). A mounted skeleton based on the holotype of M. amurensis is on display at the Central Geological and Prospecting Museum in St. Petersburg, although much of the skeleton is plaster.

== Description ==
While the holotype of M. amurensis would have measured 8 metres (26 ft) long and 4.5 metres (15 ft) tall, the largest specimen would have measured 11.24 metres (36.9 ft) long and 6.48 metres (21.3 ft) tall and weighed around 1.5-2 metric tons (3,300-4,400 pounds).

It had a broad, flat beak and a long tail, similar to related hadrosaurs.

== Classification ==
There has been some debate regarding the validity of this genus. Brett-Surman (1979) first considered it a nomen dubium, though some later workers have continued to see it as a valid taxon (Chapman et Brett Surman, 1990, for example). Most recently, Horner et al. (2004) listed the type species as a nomen dubium in the second edition of The Dinosauria.

Over the years, three species have been placed within this genus: Mandschurosaurus amurensis, M. mongoliensis, and M. laosensis. Brett-Surman (1979) considered M. mongoliensis a distinct genus, which he named Gilmoreosaurus and Horner et al. (2004) considered M. laosensis a nomen dubium; This leaves only Riabinin's original species, M. amurensis, as a possibly valid taxon.

Within Ornithopoda, Mandschurosaurus is most often placed within Hadrosauridae as a nomen dubium.

== Gallery ==
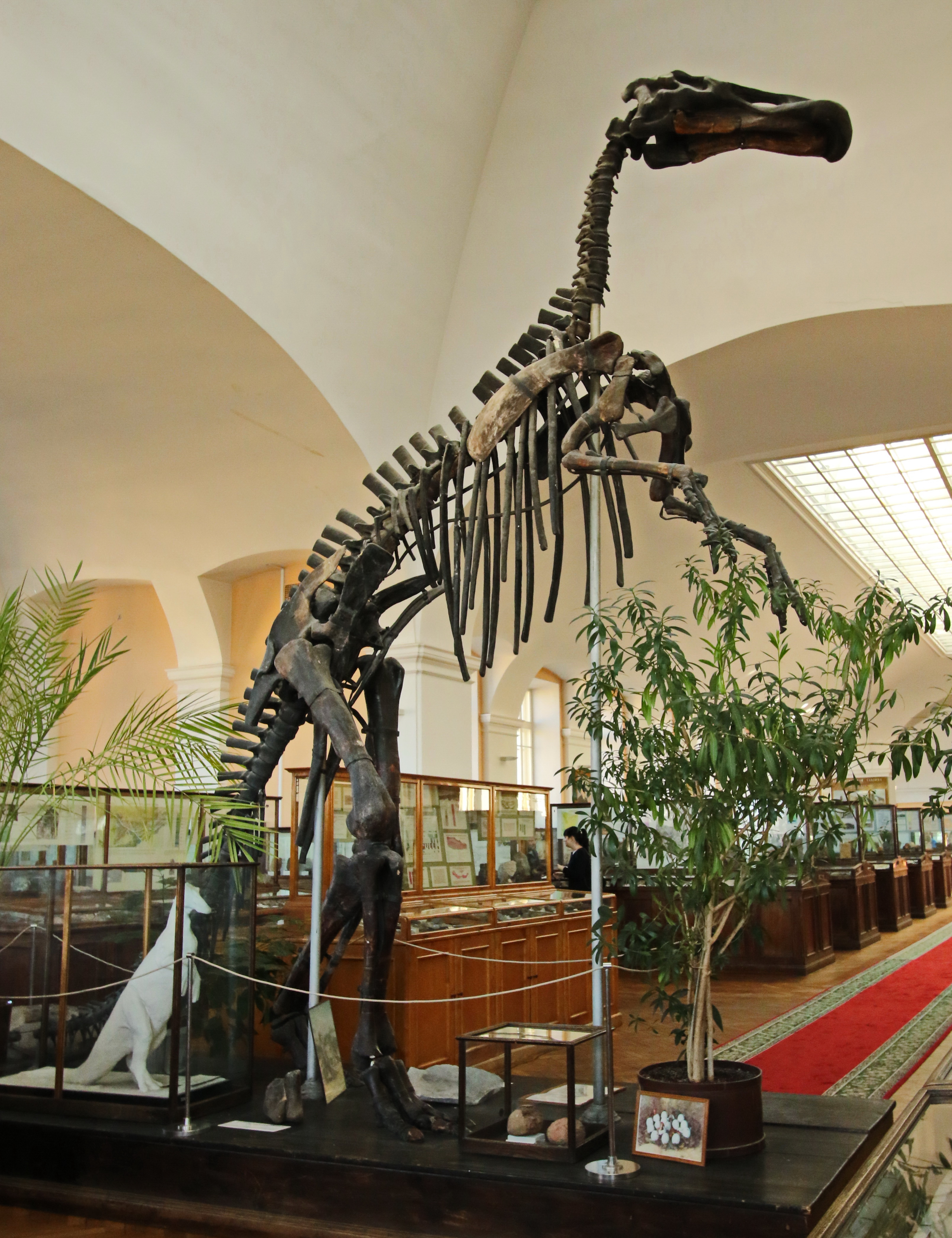
Reconstructed M. amurensis skeleton in outdated tripod-pose, VSEGEI Museum, St. Petersburg

== See also ==
- Timeline of hadrosaur research
