= Grès supérieurs Formation =

Geological formation in Laos

- Stratigraphic range: Aptian-Albian; ~120–100 Ma
- Type: Geological formation
- Unit of: Indosinias Group, equivalent with units of Khorat Group

Lithology
- Primary: Sandstone, mudstone
- Other: Siltstone

Location
- Coordinates: 17.0°N 106.0°E
- Approximate paleocoordinates: 18.0°N 112.6°E
- Region: Savannakhet Province
- Country: Laos
- Extent: Savannakhet Basin

Type section
- Named for: "Upper sandstone"
- Grès supérieurs Formation (Laos)

The Grès supérieurs Formation (French for "Upper sandstone") is a geological formation in Laos whose strata date back to the Aptian to Albian stages of the Early Cretaceous. Dinosaur remains are among the fossils that have been recovered from the formation. It is equivalent to the Khok Kruat Formation of Thailand.

== Fossil content ==
The Grès supérieurs Formation has also yielded remains of indeterminate iguanodontians, as well as ornithopod and sauropod tracks.

=== Fish ===
Fish
Genus	Species	Location	Stratigraphic position	Material	Notes	Images
Lanxangichthys	L. alticephalus			A three-dimensionally preserved skull	A basal lepisosteiform	

=== Turtle ===
Turtle
Genus	Species	Location	Stratigraphic position	Material	Notes	Images
Shachemys	S. laosiana			Carapaces, scapula and partial humerus, skull	An adochid	

=== Dinosaurs ===
Dinosaurs
Genus	Species	Location	Stratigraphic position	Material	Notes	Images
Euhelopodidae Indet.	Indeterminate					
Mandschurosaurus	M. laosensis				An indeterminate iguanodontian	
Tangvayosaurus	T. hoffeti			"[Two] partial postcranial skeletons."	A sauropod	
Titanosaurus	T. falloti				An indeterminate sauropod possibly referable to Tangvayosaurus	
Ichthyovenator	I. laosensis			An incomplete skeleton	A spinosaurid	

Color key: Taxon / Reclassified taxon / Taxon falsely reported as present / Dubious taxon or junior synonym / Ichnotaxon / Ootaxon / Morphotaxon	Notes; Uncertain or tentative taxa are in small text; ~~crossed out~~ taxa are discredited.

Other fossils

- Sauropod tracks
- Iguanodontia indet (=Mandschurosaurus laosensis)
- Euornithopod tracks

== See also ==
- List of dinosaur-bearing rock formations
