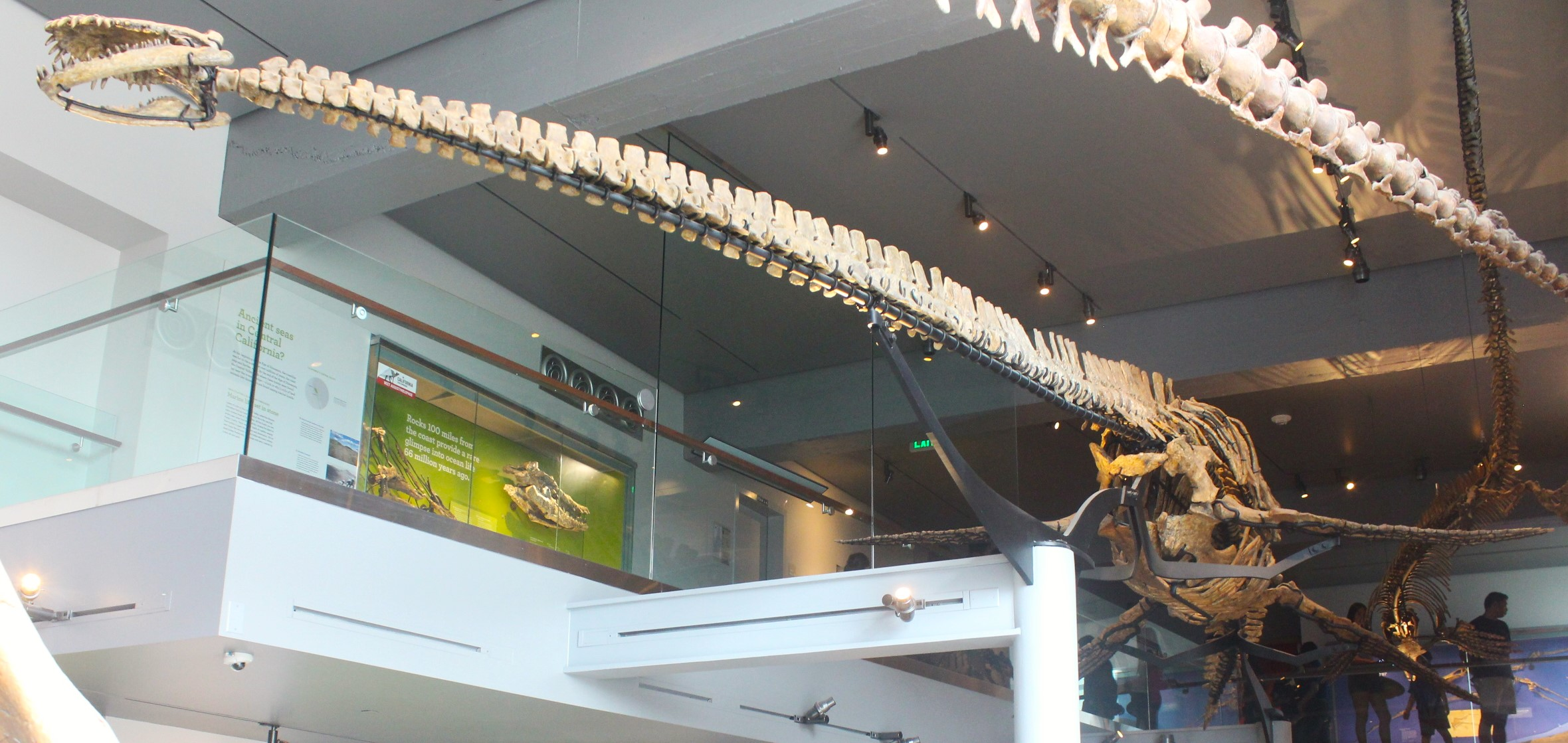
- Mounted skeleton (CIT 2802), Natural History Museum of Los Angeles County
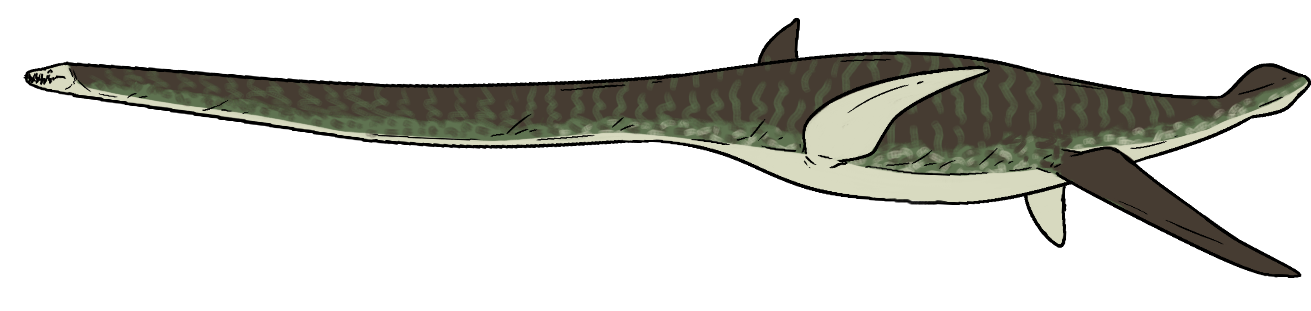
- Life reconstruction of M. stocki

Scientific classification
- Kingdom: Animalia
- Phylum: Chordata
- Class: Reptilia
- Superorder: †Sauropterygia
- Order: †Plesiosauria
- Superfamily: †Plesiosauroidea
- Family: †Elasmosauridae
- Clade: †Euelasmosaurida
- Clade: †Weddellonectia
- Genus: †Morenosaurus; Welles, 1943
- Species: †M. stocki

Binomial name
- †Morenosaurus stocki Welles, 1943

= Morenosaurus =

Morenosaurus Temporal range: Late Cretaceous, 70–66 Ma

Extinct genus of reptiles

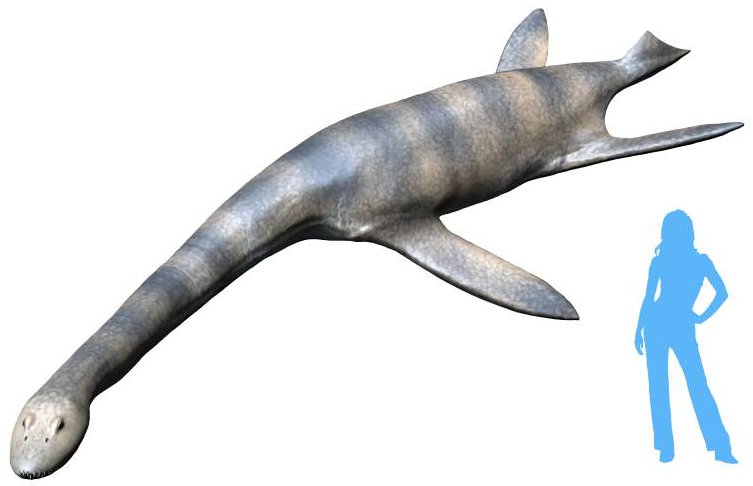
Life restoration

Morenosaurus is an extinct genus of plesiosaur from the Cretaceous of what is now California. The type species is Morenosaurus stocki, first named by Samuel Welles in 1943, in honor of Dr. Chester Stock. The species was found by Robert Wallace and Arthur Drescher in the Panoche Hills region of Fresno County. The skeleton they found was fairly complete, and lacked only the head and parts of the neck and paddles; the preserved portion of the trunk and tail is 3.63 metres (11.9 ft) long. The skeleton was originally mounted at Caltech but is now in the Natural History Museum of Los Angeles County.

Morenosaurus may have been similar to Elasmosaurus or Thalassomedon, but studies in the early 2000s indicated that the fossils were too scrappy to identify to the family level.

== See also ==
- List of plesiosaur genera
- Timeline of plesiosaur research
