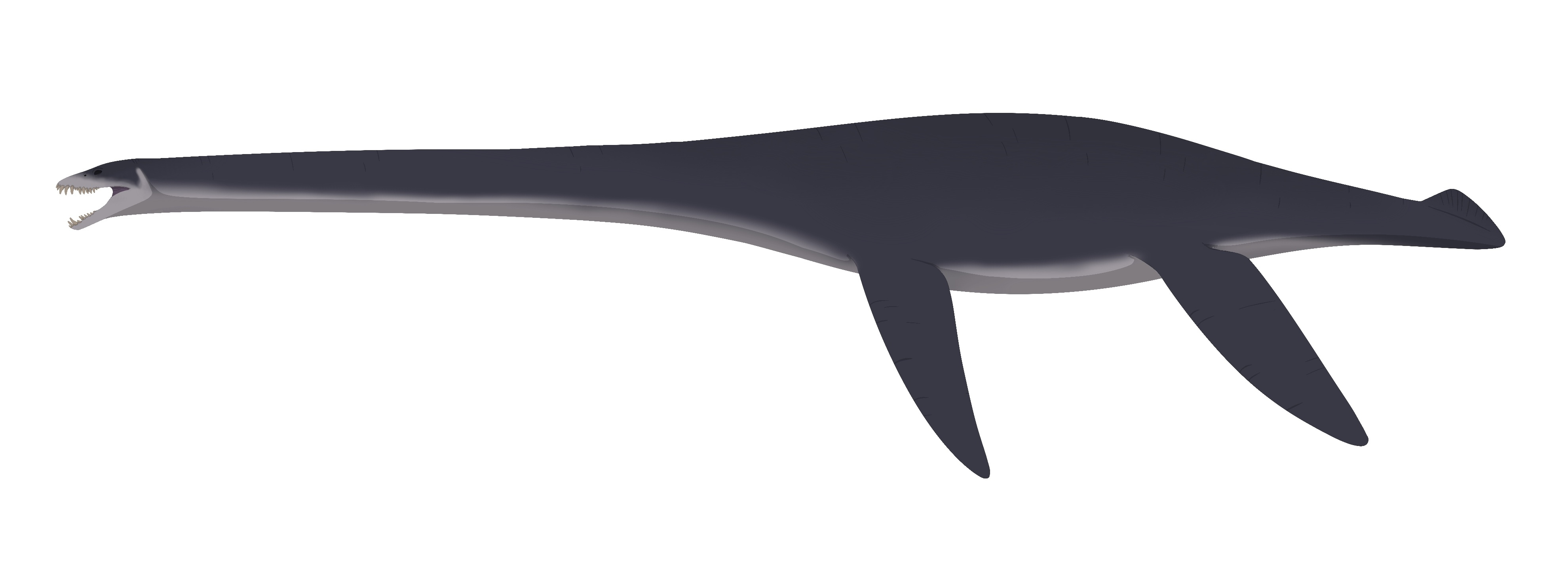
- Life restoration

Scientific classification
- Domain: Eukaryota
- Kingdom: Animalia
- Phylum: Chordata
- Class: Reptilia
- Superorder: †Sauropterygia
- Order: †Plesiosauria
- Family: †Elasmosauridae
- Genus: †Fresnosaurus; Welles, 1943
- Species: †F. drescheri

Binomial name
- †Fresnosaurus drescheri Welles, 1943

= Fresnosaurus =

Fresnosaurus Temporal range: Late Cretaceous, 70–66 Ma

Extinct genus of reptiles

Fresnosaurus is an extinct genus of plesiosaur from the Late Cretaceous (Maastrichtian stage) of what is now California. The type species is Fresnosaurus drescheri, first described by Welles in 1943. The generic name Fresnosaurus honors Fresno County, while the specific name honors Arthur Drescher.

Fresnosaurus was probably at least 9 meters (30 feet) in length. Like all elasmosaurid plesiosaurs, it probably ate small bony fish, belemnites, and ammonites.

== See also ==
- List of plesiosaur genera
- Timeline of plesiosaur research
