= Unktaheela =

Unktaheela Temporal range: Late Cretaceous (middle Campanian), 80.57–80.5 Ma
- Diagram of a restored skull

Scientific classification
- Kingdom: Animalia
- Phylum: Chordata
- Class: Reptilia
- Superorder: †Sauropterygia
- Order: †Plesiosauria
- Superfamily: †Plesiosauroidea
- Family: †Polycotylidae
- Subfamily: †Polycotylinae
- Clade: †Dolichorhynchia
- Genus: †Unktaheela; Clark, O'Keefe & Slack, 2023
- Species: †U. specta

Binomial name
- †Unktaheela specta Clark, O'Keefe & Slack, 2023

Genus of polycotylid plesiosaurs

Unktaheela is an extinct genus of polycotylid plesiosaur from the Late Cretaceous Sharon Springs Formation of the United States. The genus contains a single species, U. specta, known from two skulls and partial skeletons. Unktaheela represents the smallest known polycotylid.

== Discovery and naming ==
Unktaheela type localities in Wyoming (holotype) and South Dakota (paratype)

The Unktaheela fossil material was discovered in sediments of the Sharon Springs Formation (Baculites obtusus zone) in the United States. The holotype specimen, UCM 35059, was found near Redbird in Niobrara County, Wyoming, and it consists of a skull with mandible and a nearly complete series of cervical, sacral, and caudal vertebrae, a partial series of dorsal vertebrae, partial pectoral and pelvic girdles, and elements of all the paddle limbs.

The paratype specimen, SDSM 142501, was found on the Thomas Conger Ranch near Buffalo Gap in Fall River County, South Dakota. It consists of a complete skull, broken mandible, and five fragmentary remains of the postcrania that remain unidentified. An isolated but complete metacarpal IV (wing bone) of the pterosaur Pteranodon longiceps was also found in this locality.

In 1996, Kenneth Carpenter described specimen UCM 35059 as belonging to a juvenile individual of the related Dolichorhynchops osborni.

In 2023, Robert O. Clark, F. Robin O'Keefe, and Sara E. Slack described Unktaheela specta as a new genus and species of polycotylid based on these fossil remains. The generic name, "Unktaheela", references Unhcegila, a legendary Lakota horned water serpent known for its keen eyes. The specific name "specta" is derived from the Latin word "spectare", meaning "to see," in reference to the hypothesized visual adaptations and morphology of the orbital.

== Description ==
Unktaheela was a very small polycotylid that, when mature, had some characteristics that might be expected of ontogenetically young individuals. The holotype skull is 44.4 centimetres (17.5 in) long, and the paratype skull is 43 centimetres (17 in) long. These lengths are smaller than any other known mature polycotylid skull, and are comparable to the size of juvenile skulls of Dolichorhynchops and Mauriciosaurus. Unktaheela was approximately 2.3–2.6 metres (7.5–8.5 ft) long. Adult individuals of other small polycotylids such as Dolichorhynchops and Scalamagnus were closer to 3 metres (9.8 ft) in length. The skull of Unktaheela has unusually large orbits, a feature commonly associated with juvenile animals. However, many anatomical characteristics of the known specimens indicate that they belonged to fully grown individuals. For example, many bones are fused in the specimens that are typically unfused in juvenile plesiosaurs. The humeri are wide, as opposed to the narrow form seen in juveniles. Unktaheela had at least 26 maxillary teeth. In comparison, adult individuals of Dolichorhynchops had at least 22, while juveniles have 13–14.

== Classification ==
Clark, O'Keefe & Slack (2023) recovered Unktaheela as a polycotylid member of the plesiosaur clade Leptocleidia, as the sister taxon to the clade formed by Martinectes and an unnamed polycotyline from the Niobrara Formation. These species, together with Dolichorhynchops spp. (D. osborni and D. herschelensis), form the clade Dolichorhynchia within the Polycotylinae. The results of their phylogenetic analyses are shown in the cladogram below:

- Leptocleidia
  - Brancasaurus
  - - Vectocleidus
    - Leptocleididae
    - Polycotylidae
      - Edgarosaurus
      - - Palmulasaurus
        - - - Pahasapasaurus
            - Occultonectia
          - - - Manemergus
              - Thililua
            - Polycotylinae
              - - Eopolycotylus
                - Polycotylus latipinnis
              - - Scalamagnus
                - - Trinacromerum bentonianum
                  - Dolichorhynchia
                    - - Dolichorhynchops osborni
                      - Dolichorhynchops herschelensis
                    - - - Martinectes
                        - ROM 29010 (Niobrara polycotyline)
                      - - Unktaheela
