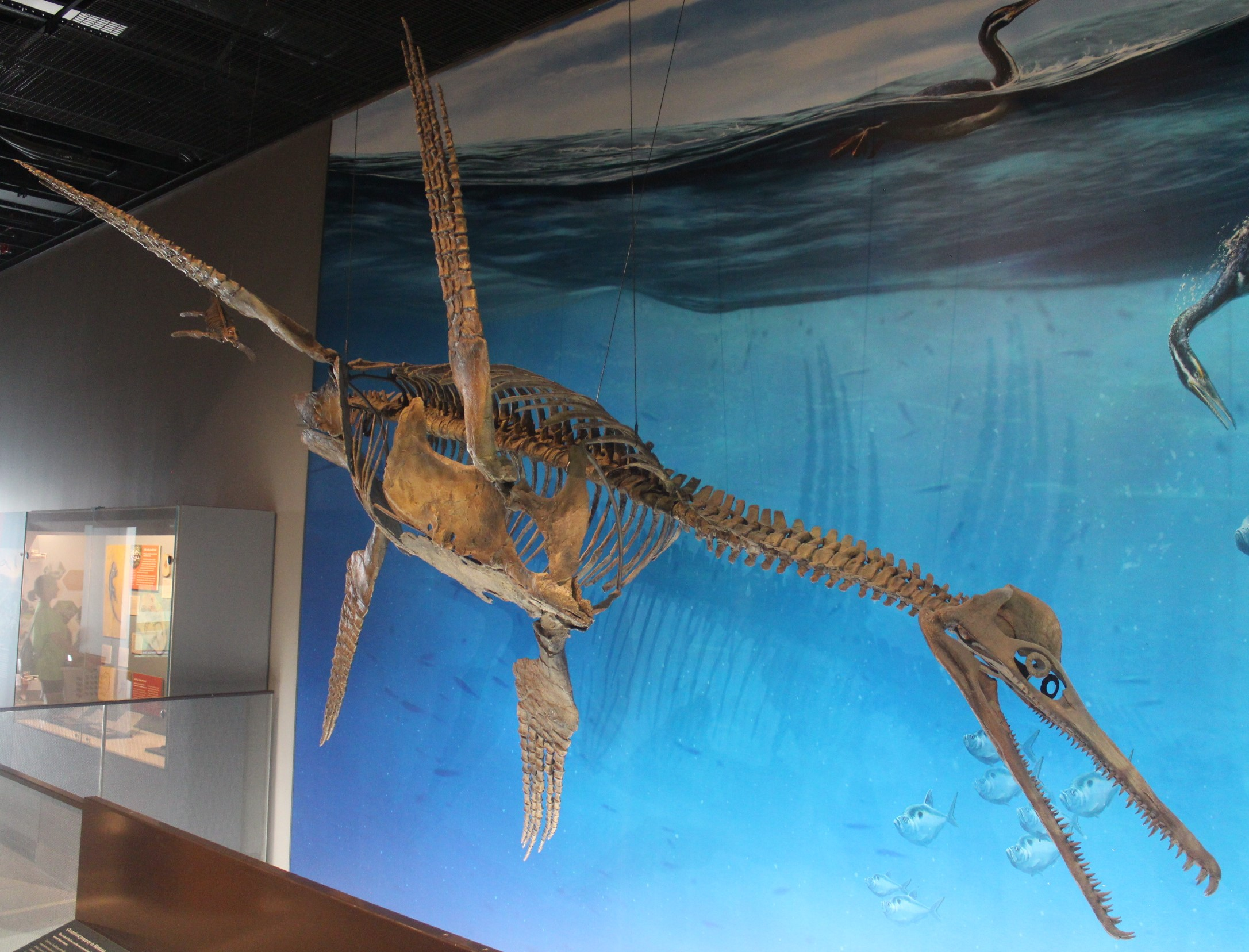
- Skeleton mount, University of Michigan Museum of Natural History

Scientific classification
- Kingdom: Animalia
- Phylum: Chordata
- Class: Reptilia
- Superorder: †Sauropterygia
- Order: †Plesiosauria
- Superfamily: †Plesiosauroidea
- Family: †Polycotylidae
- Subfamily: †Polycotylinae
- Clade: †Dolichorhynchia
- Genus: †Martinectes; Clark, O'Keefe & Slack, 2023

Type species
- †Trinacromerum bonneri Adams, 1997

Synonyms
- Trinacromerum bonneri Adams, 1997; Dolichorhynchops bonneri (Adams, 1997))

= Martinectes =

Martinectes Temporal range: Late Cretaceous (late Campanian), 80.57–78.25 Ma

Genus of polycotylid plesiosaurs

Martinectes is an extinct genus of polycotylid plesiosaur from the Late Cretaceous (Campanian stage) of North America and possibly European Russia. The genus contains a single species M. bonneri, known from multiple skeletons and skulls. Martinectes was historically considered to represent a species of the genus Trinacromerum and later Dolichorhynchops before it was moved to its own genus. It was a large polycotylid measuring at least around 5 metres (16 ft) long.

== History ==
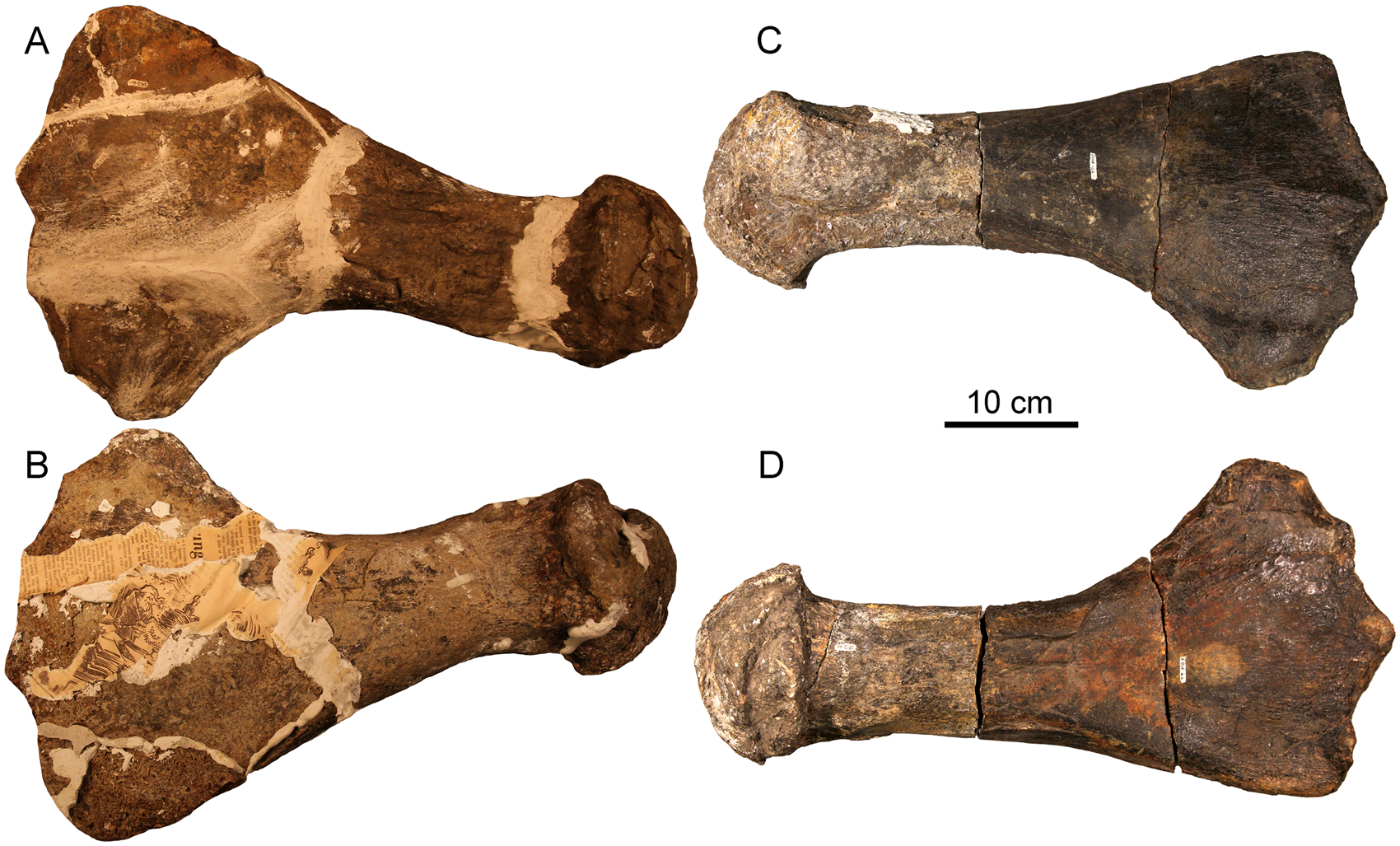
Humerus and femur of specimen UNSM 50133

Two very large specimens of a polycotylid plesiosaur (KUVP 40001 and 40002) were collected from the Pierre Shale of Wyoming and later reported on by Adams in her 1997 Masters thesis, and in the same year, she officially described the specimens as a new species of Trinacromerum (T. bonneri). The specific name honoured University of Kansas preparator Orville Bonner. Unknown to her at the time, Carpenter (1996) had revised the Polycotylidae and separated Dolichorhynchops from Trinacromerum, raising the question as to whether or not the specimens represented a separate species or just larger individuals of D. osborni. A study in 2008 found that T. bonneri is a valid species of Dolichorhynchops, D. bonneri. In 2023, Clark, O'Keefe and Slack assigned D. bonneri from the Sharon Springs Formation of the United States to a new genus Martinectes, which means "Martin's swimmer". In 2025, polycotylid teeth material from the Rybushka Formation of European Russia were referred to cf. Martinectes.

== Description ==
Martinectes was a large polycotylid plesiosaur. In 2017, Everhart suggested that KUVP 40001 would have measured up to 6–7 metres (20–23 ft) in length. In 2025, Zverkov and Meleshin suggested that Martinectes would have been similar in size to Polycotylus, around 5.5 metres (18 ft) long. In 2026, Zhao estimated that Martinectes measured 4.95 metres (16.2 ft) long and weighed 1.27 metric tons (1.40 short tons).

== Classification ==
Clark, O'Keefe & Slack (2023) recovered Martinectes as a polycotylid member of the plesiosaur clade Leptocleidia, as the sister taxon to an unnamed polycotyline from the Niobrara Formation. This clade, in turn, is sister to Unktaheela. These species, together with Dolichorhynchops spp. (D. osborni and D. herschelensis), form the clade Dolichorhynchia within the Polycotylinae. The results of their phylogenetic analyses are shown in the cladogram below:

- Leptocleidia
  - Brancasaurus
  - - Vectocleidus
    - Leptocleididae
    - Polycotylidae
      - Edgarosaurus
      - - Palmulasaurus
        - - - Pahasapasaurus
            - Occultonectia
          - - - Manemergus
              - Thililua
            - Polycotylinae
              - - Eopolycotylus
                - Polycotylus latipinnis
              - - Scalamagnus
                - - Trinacromerum bentonianum
                  - Dolichorhynchia
                    - - Dolichorhynchops osborni
                      - Dolichorhynchops herschelensis
                    - - - Martinectes
                        - ROM 29010 (Niobrara polycotyline)
                      - - Unktaheela
