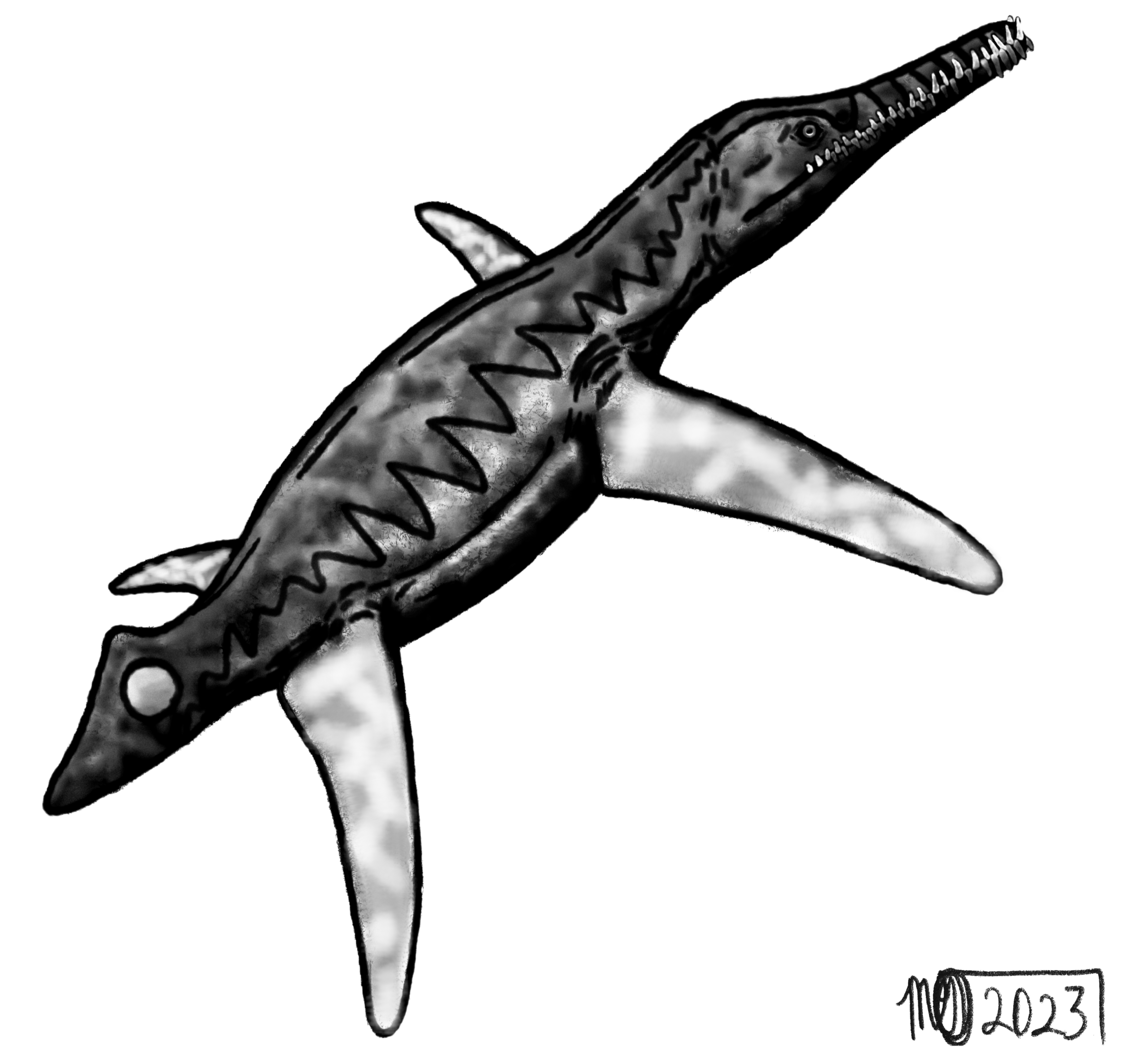
- Life restoration

Scientific classification
- Kingdom: Animalia
- Phylum: Chordata
- Class: Reptilia
- Superorder: †Sauropterygia
- Order: †Plesiosauria
- Superfamily: †Plesiosauroidea
- Family: †Polycotylidae
- Subfamily: †Polycotylinae
- Genus: †Scalamagnus; Clark, O'Keefe & Slack, 2023

Type species
- †Dolichorhynchops tropicensis Schmeisser McKean, 2012

= Scalamagnus =

Scalamagnus Temporal range: Late Cretaceous (early Turonian), 93.5–92.0 Ma

Genus of polycotylid plesiosaurs

Scalamagnus is an extinct genus of polycotylid plesiosaur from the Late Cretaceous Tropic Shale Formation of the United States. The genus contains a single species S. tropicensis, known from a skull and two partial skeletons. Scalamagnus was historically considered to represent a species of the genus Dolichorhynchops before it was moved to its own genus.

== History ==
The taxon was first named as a species of Dolichorhynchops by Rebecca Schmeisser McKean in 2012. The specific name is derived from the name of the Tropic Shale, in which the two specimens were found. It is known from the holotype MNA V10046, an almost complete, well-preserved 3.2 metres (10 ft) long skeleton including most of the skull and from the referred specimen MNA V9431, fragmentary postcranial elements. It was collected between 2003 and 2005 by the Museum of Northern Arizona from a single locality within the Tropic Shale of Utah, dating to the early Turonian stage of the early Late Cretaceous, about 93.5-91 million years ago. D. tropicensis extended the known stratigraphic range for Dolichorhynchops back by approximately 7 million years. Previously three additional polycotylid taxa, Eopolycotylus, Palmulasaurus and Trinacromerum, have been named from the same formation, two of which are currently endemic to the Tropic Shale. A 2023 study assigns D. tropicensis to a new genus, Scalamagnus. The generic name is a combination of the Latin scala, "staircase", and magnus, "large", referring to the Grand Staircase-Escalante National Monument.

== Classification ==
Clark, O'Keefe & Slack (2023) recovered Scalamagnus as a polycotylid member of the plesiosaur clade Leptocleidia, as the sister taxon to the clade formed by Trinacromerum and the Dolichorhynchia within the Polycotylinae. The results of their phylogenetic analyses are shown in the cladogram below:

- Leptocleidia
  - Brancasaurus
  - - Vectocleidus
    - Leptocleididae
    - Polycotylidae
      - Edgarosaurus
      - - Palmulasaurus
        - - - Pahasapasaurus
            - Occultonectia
          - - - Manemergus
              - Thililua
            - Polycotylinae
              - - Eopolycotylus
                - Polycotylus latipinnis
              - - Scalamagnus
                - - Trinacromerum bentonianum
                  - Dolichorhynchia
                    - - Dolichorhynchops osborni
                      - Dolichorhynchops herschelensis
                    - - - Martinectes
                        - ROM 29010 (Niobrara polycotyline)
                      - - Unktaheela

== Paleobiology ==
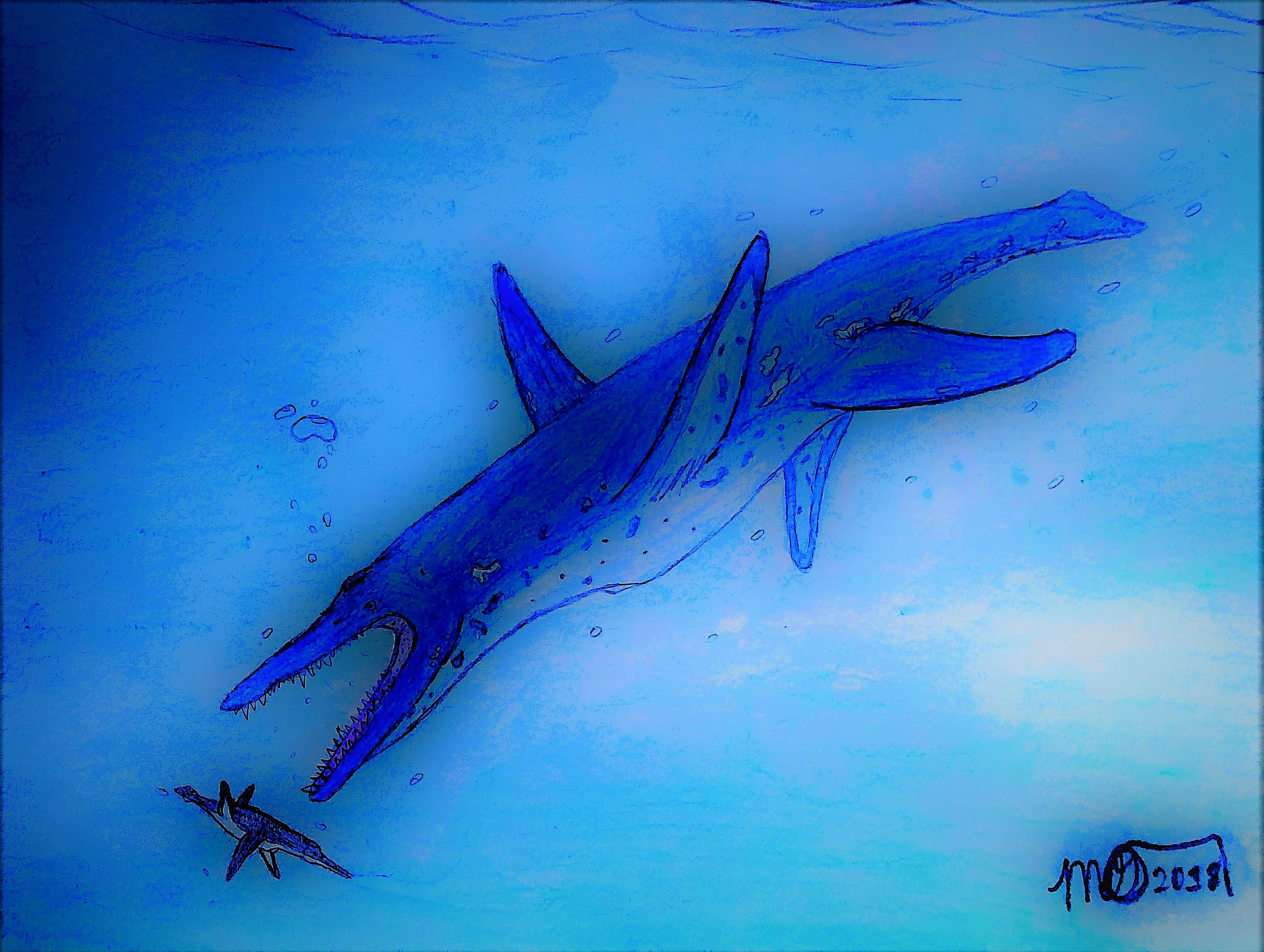
Life restoration of Scalamagnus being chased by Megacephalosaurus

The holotype is associated with 289 gastroliths, which is unusual in comparison to most polycotylid skeletons that generally lack gastroliths. Ranging from less than 0.1 grams to 18.5 grams, the total mass of the gastroliths was about 518 grams. About three-quarters of the stones weighed less than 2 grams, with the mean mass and median mass of the stones respectively estimated at 1.9 grams and 0.8 grams. The gastroliths had high mean value and variability in sphericity, suggesting that this individual was obtaining its stones from rivers located along the western side of the Western Interior Seaway.
