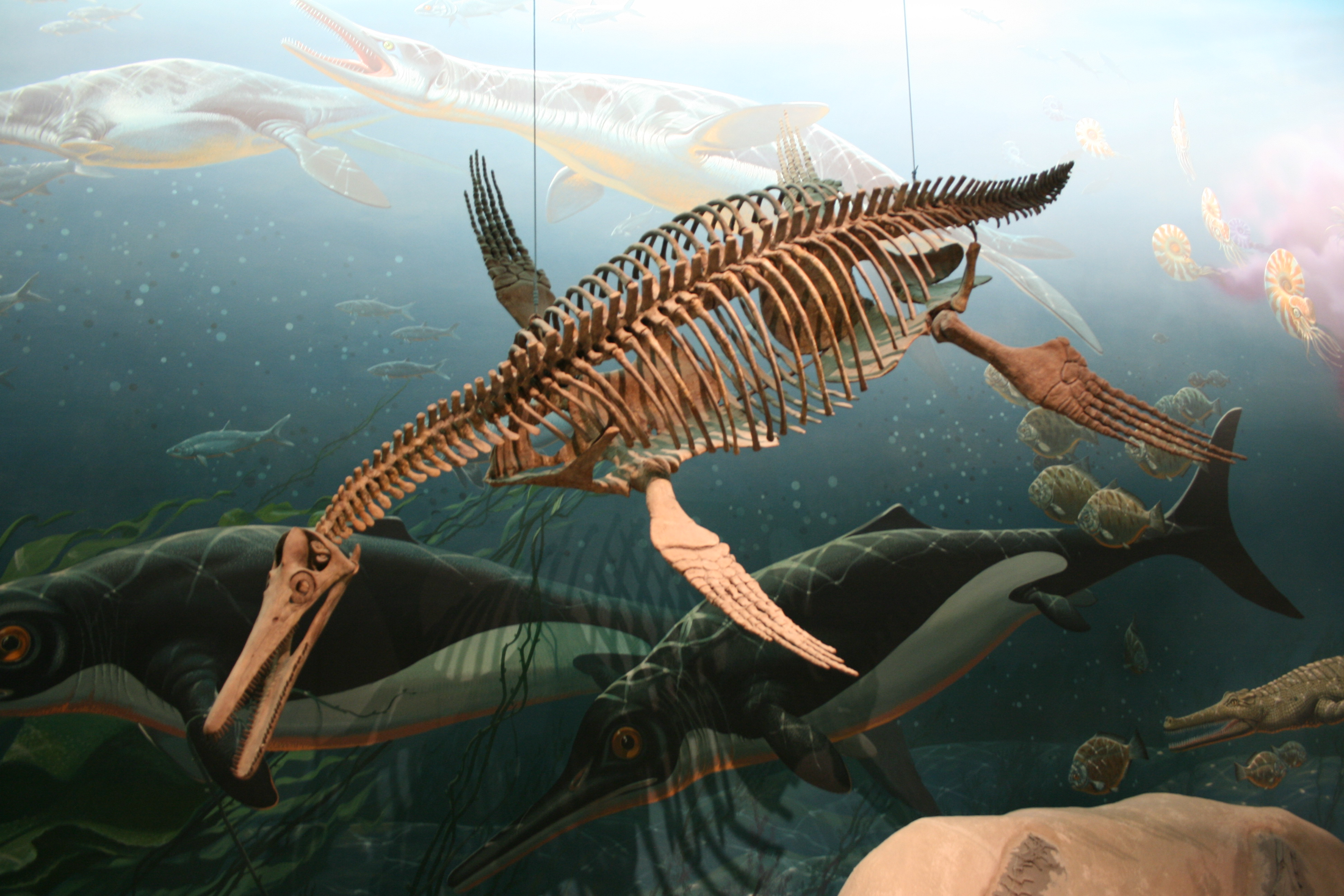
- D. osborni, National Museum of Natural History, Washington D. C.

Scientific classification
- Kingdom: Animalia
- Phylum: Chordata
- Class: Reptilia
- Superorder: †Sauropterygia
- Order: †Plesiosauria
- Superfamily: †Plesiosauroidea
- Family: †Polycotylidae
- Subfamily: †Polycotylinae
- Clade: †Dolichorhynchia
- Genus: †Dolichorhynchops; Williston, 1902

Type species
- †Dolichorhynchops osborni Williston, 1902

Other species
- †D. herschelensis Sato, 2005

= Dolichorhynchops =

Dolichorhynchops Temporal range: Late Cretaceous, 87–72 Ma

Extinct genus of reptiles

Dolichorhynchops is an extinct genus of polycotylid plesiosaur from the Late Cretaceous of North America, containing the species D. osborni and D. herschelensis, with two previous species having been assigned to new genera. Definitive specimens of D. osborni have been found in the late Coniacian to early Campanian rocks, while those of D. herschelensis have been found in the late Campanian to early Maastrichtian rocks. Dolichorhynchops was a relatively small plesiosaur, measuring around 3 metres (9.8 ft) long. Its Greek generic name means "long-nosed face".

== Discovery and species ==
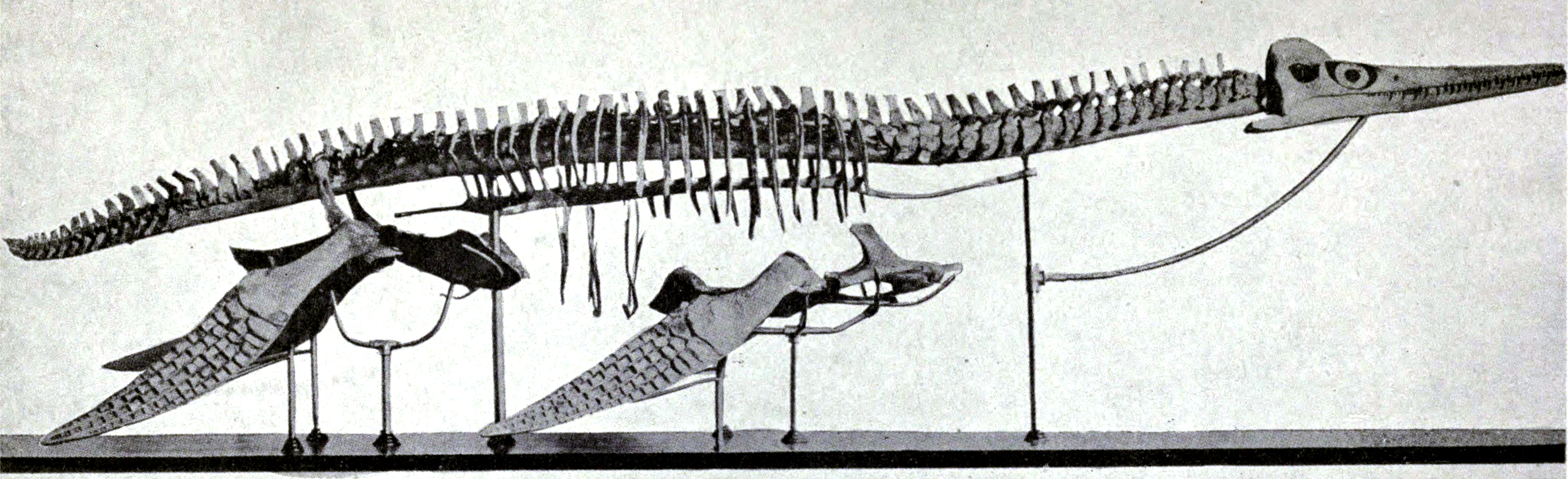
Mounted skeleton of the holotype of D. osborni (from Williston, 1903), in the University of Kansas Museum of Natural History

The holotype specimen of Dolichorhynchops osborni, KUVP 1300, was discovered in the upper Smoky Hill Chalk Logan County, Kansas, by George Fryer Sternberg, as a teenager, in around 1900. The remains were collected by him and his father, Charles Hazelius Sternberg, and then sold to the University of Kansas (Lawrence, Kansas). KUVP 1300 was prepared and mounted by H.T. Martin under the supervision of Dr. Samuel Wendell Williston, who described and named it in 1902. A more detailed description and photographs were provided by Williston 1903). The specimen has been on display in the KU Museum of Natural History since that time. Everhart 2004b estimated that the holotype had a skull measuring 57 cm (1.87 ft) long.

George Sternberg found a second, less complete specimen of D.osborni in 1926. In his effort to sell the specimen to a museum, Sternberg took detailed photographs of the skull. The specimen was eventually mounted in plaster and was acquired by the Harvard Museum of Comparative Zoology. MCZ 1064 was on display there until some time in the 1950s. This specimen was never completely described although the skull was figured by O'Keefe 2004. (See also Everhart 2004b)

The specimen of D. osborni on exhibit at the Sternberg, FHSM VP-404 was found by Marion Bonner near Russell Springs in Logan County in the early 1950s. Carpenter 1996 estimated that FHSM VP-404, with a skull measuring 51.3 centimetres (1.68 ft) long, had a total body length of approximately 3.07 metres (10.1 ft). The skull was crushed flat but is in very good condition. This specimen was initially reported by Sternberg & Walker 1957, and then was the subject of a Masters thesis by Bonner 1964 who referred to it as Trinacromerum osborni. In 2026, Zhao estimated that the specimen would have measured 2.96 metres (9.7 ft) long and weighed 425 kilograms (937 lb).

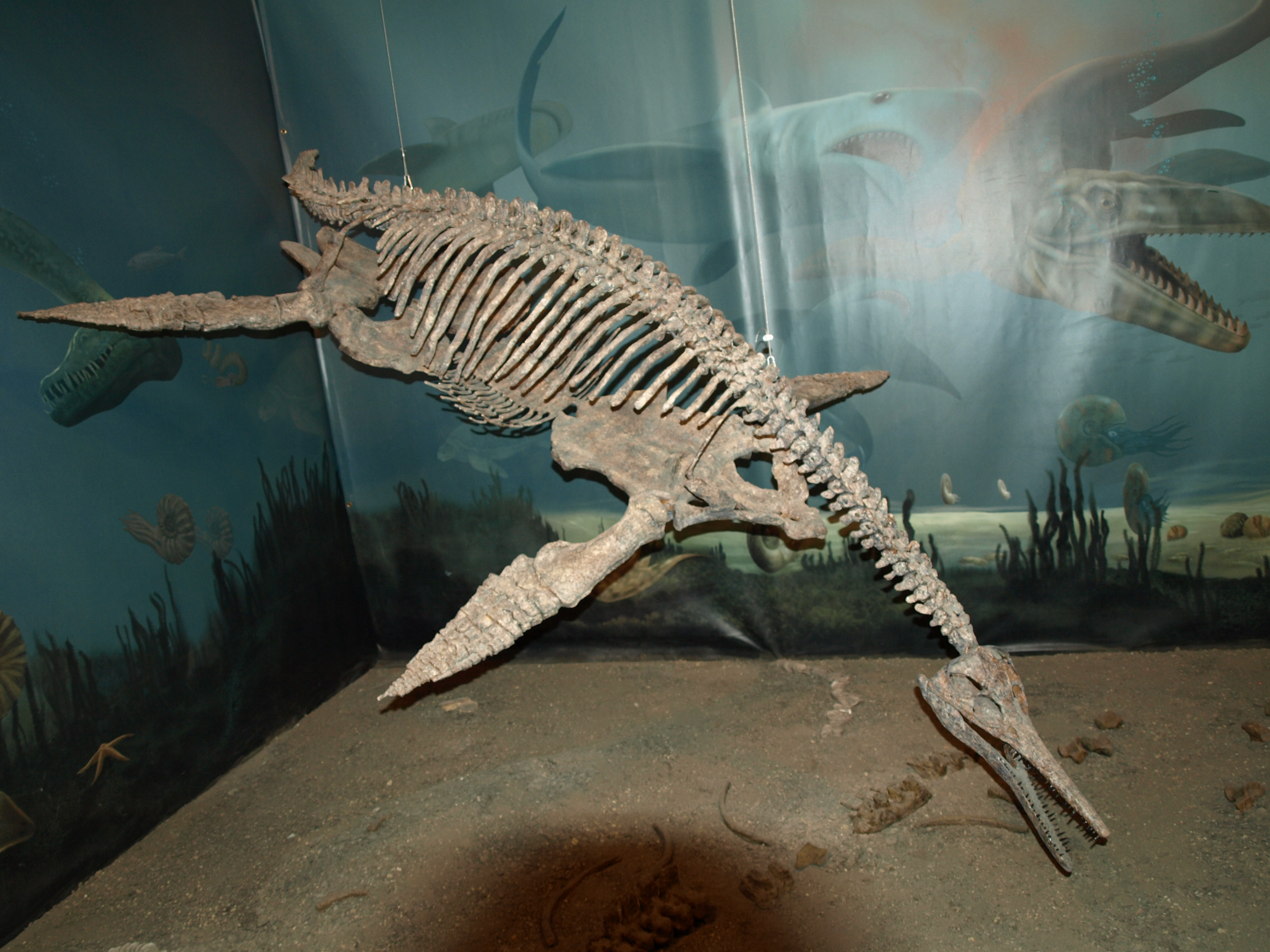
Skeleton in Canadian Fossil Discovery Centre

D. herschelensis was described as a new species by Tamaki Sato in 2005. It was discovered in the Bearpaw Formation of Saskatchewan, Canada, a Late Cretaceous (late Campanian to early Maastrichtian) rock formation. The fossil was found close to the town of Herschel in southwestern Saskatchewan, from which the species name is derived. The rock formation it was found in consists of sandstones, mudstones and shales laid down in the Western Interior Seaway, just before it began to revert to dry land.

The type specimen of D. herschelensis was discovered in a disarticulated state (i.e. the bones were scattered about the discovery site). The skull, lower jaw, ribs, pelvis and shoulder blades were all recovered, but the spine was incomplete, so the exact number of vertebrae the living animal would have had is unknown. All four limbs are missing, with the exception of nine small phalanges (finger bones) and a small number of limb bones found close by which may belong to the animal in question.

The specimen is believed to be an adult, due to the fusion of certain bones (it is generally assumed—not necessarily strictly correctly so—that other animals' skulls, much as humans', consist of dissociated bones interconnected by cartilage fontanelles that do not entirely close until full maturity). It is also believed to have been substantially smaller than its close relative, D. osborni, as some juvenile specimens of D. osborni are larger than the adult specimen of D. herschelensis. Assuming that only a few vertebrae are missing from the skeleton, the animal is estimated to be about 2.5–3 metres (8.2–9.8 ft) in length. The snout is long and thin, with numerous tooth sockets. However, very few of the thin, sharp teeth remain.

In 2025, teeth material from the Rybushka Formation of European Russia were referred to cf. Dolichorhynchops.

=== Formerly assigned species ===
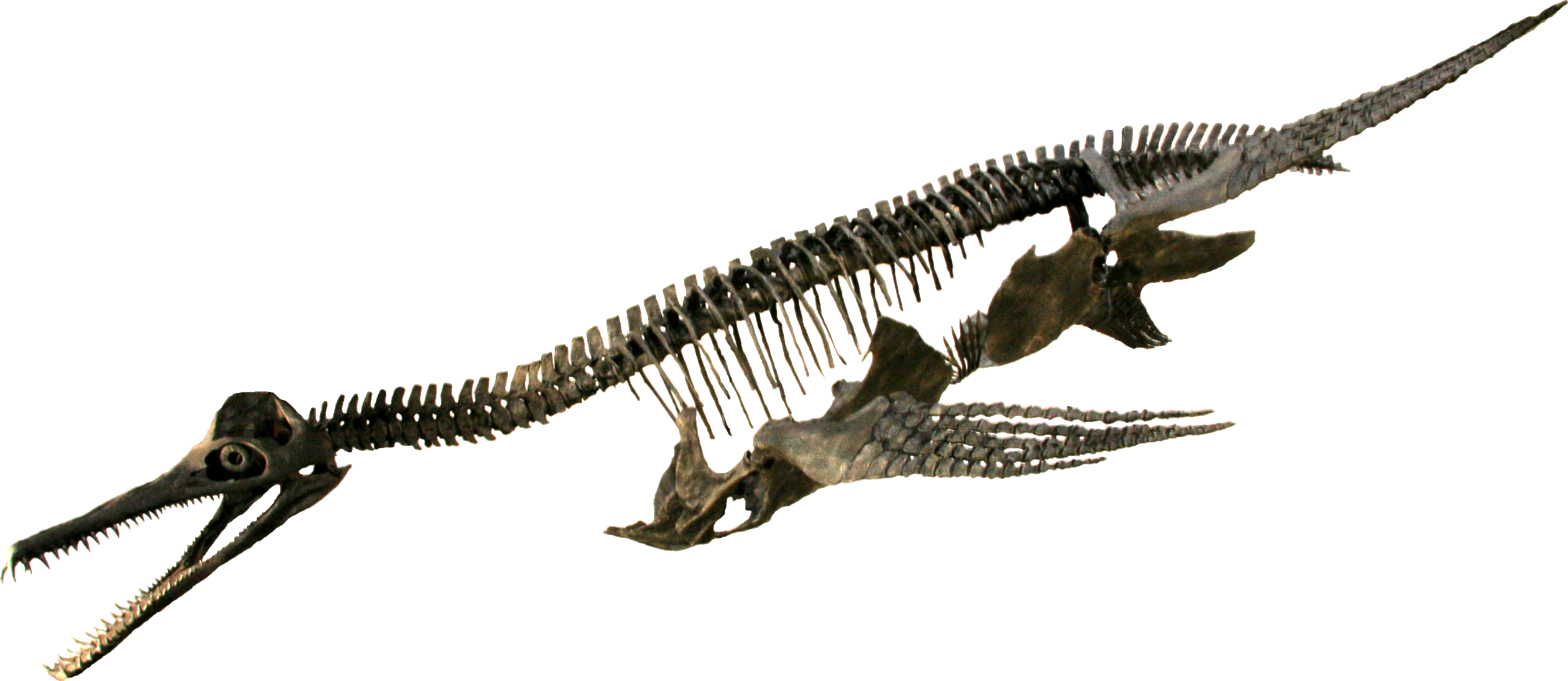
Skeleton of Martinectes, which was formerly included in this genus

Two very large specimens of a polycotylid plesiosaur (KUVP 40001 and 40002) were collected from the Pierre Shale of Wyoming and later reported on by Adams in her 1977 Masters thesis. Later (1997), she officially described (1997) as a new species of Trinacromerum (T. bonneri). Unknown to her at the time, Carpenter (1996) had revised the Polycotylidae and separated Dolichorhynchops from Trinacromerum, raising the question as to whether or not the specimens represented a separate species or just larger individuals of D. osborni. A study in 2008 found that T. bonneri is a valid species of Dolichorhynchops, D. bonneri. Everhart (2017) suggested that KUVP 40001 would have measured up to 6–7 metres (20–23 ft) in length. A 2023 study assigns D. bonneri to a new genus, Martinectes. Other specimens previously reported as D. osborni by Carpenter 1996 (UNSM 50133 and AMNH 5834) were also referred to this taxon.

D. tropicensis was first named by Rebecca Schmeisser McKean in 2011. The specific name is derived from the name of the Tropic Shale, in which the two specimens of D. tropicensis were found. It is known from the holotype MNA V10046, an almost complete, well-preserved 3.2 metres (10 ft) long skeleton including most of the skull and from the referred specimen MNA V9431, fragmentary postcranial elements. It was collected by the Museum of Northern Arizona from a single locality within the Tropic Shale of Utah, dating to the early Turonian stage of the early Late Cretaceous, about 93.5-91 million years ago. D. tropicensis extended the known stratigraphic range for Dolichorhynchops back by approximately 7 million years, but the 2023 study assigns D. tropicensis to a new genus, Scalamagnus.

== Classification ==
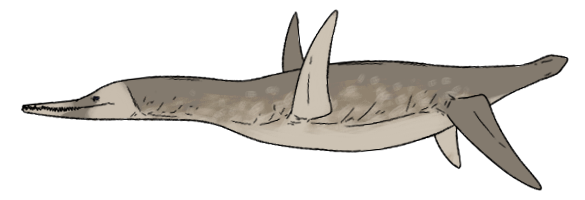
Life restoration of D. osborni

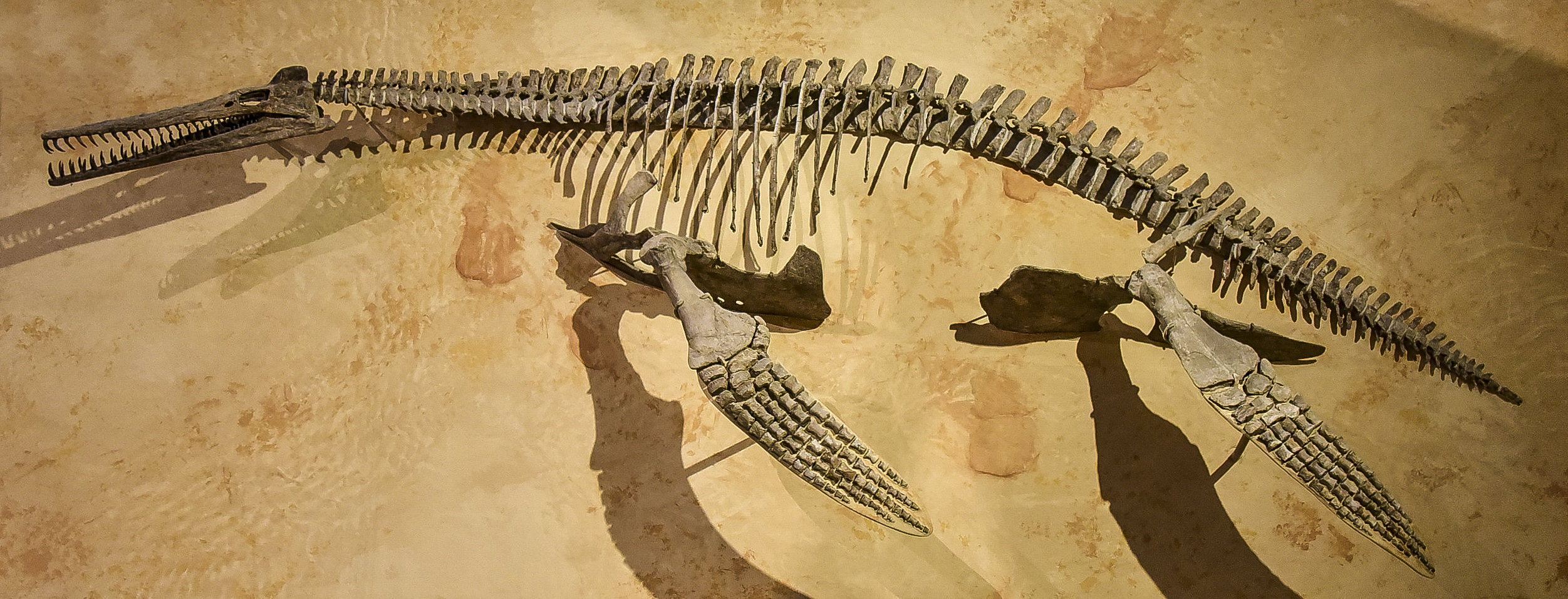
D. osborni in Vienna

Below is a cladogram of polycotylid relationships from Ketchum & Benson, 2011.

- Plesiosauroidea
  - Cryptoclididae
  - Leptocleidia
    - Leptocleididae
    - Polycotylidae
      - Edgarosaurus
      - - - Plesiopleurodon
          - QM F18041
        - - - Eopolycotylus
            - Polycotylus
            - Thililua
          - - Trinacromerum
            - - Manemergus
              - - Dolichorhynchops herschelensis
                - - Dolichorhynchops
                  - Palmulasaurus

== See also ==
- List of plesiosaur genera
- Timeline of plesiosaur research
