= Rybushka Formation =

- Stratigraphic range: Campanian; ~84–71 Ma
- Type: Geological formation

Lithology
- Primary: Sandstone
- Other: Phosphorite

Location
- Coordinates: 51.3°N 45.0°E
- Approximate paleocoordinates: 42.6°N 40.2°E
- Region: Penza, Saratov
- Country: Russia
- Rybushka Formation (Russia)

The Rybushka Formation is a upper Campanian geologic formation in the Penza and Saratov Oblasts of European Russia. The largest location of fossils is located near the village of Malaya Serdoba in the Penza region.

This formation is one of the largest in Europe in terms of its abundance of marine reptile and pterosaur remains, and the largest marine formation in Russia. One of the formation's unique features is the discovery of many species of fish, sharks, and marine reptiles previously known only from specific regions, such as North America and Western Europe. Pterosaur, fish and invertebrate fossils have been recovered from the formation.

== Fossil content ==
The following fossils have been reported from the formation:

- Amylodon karamysh
- Archaeolamna kopingensis
- Bogolubovia orientalis
- Bonnerichthys gladius
- Cretalamna appendiculata
- C. cf. borealis
- C. cf. sarcoportheta
- Crassescyliorhinus germanicus
- Enchodus gladiolus
- E. petrosus
- E. dirus
- Eostriatolamia segedini
- E. venusta
- Georgiasaurus penzensis
- Hesperornis rossicus
- Ischyodus bifurcatus
- Volgadraco bogolubovi
- Pseudocorax laevis
- Protostega gigas
- Paralbula casei
- Squalicorax kaupi
- Squatina hassei
- Scyliorhinus elongatus
- Scapanorhynchus raphiodon
- Saurocephalus lanciformis
- Archaeolamna sp.
- Anomotodon sp.
- Chlamys sp.
- Cederstroemia sp.
- cf. Dolichorhynchops sp.
- Edaphodon sp.
- Elasmodus sp.
- Eostriatolamia sp.
- Gryphaeostrea sp.
- Heterodontus sp.
- Hesperornis sp.
- Monticulina sp.
- cf. Martinectes sp.
- Mosasaurus sp.
- Prognathodon sp.
- Platecarpus sp.
- Pachyrhizodus sp.
- Polycotylus sp. (previously Polycotylus ultimus)
- Solariella sp.
- Squatirhina sp.
- Synechodus sp.
- Tylosaurus sp.
- Rhinobatos spp.
- Clidastes propython
- Latoplatecarpus willistoni
- Lepidenteron lewesiensis
- Azhdarchidae indet.
- Chelospharginae indet.
- Chondrichthyes indet.
- Decapoda indet.
- Elasmobranchii indet.
- Elasmosauridae indet.
- Enchodontidae indet.
- Hemiscylliidae indet.
- Halisaurinae indet.
- Hesperornithiformes indet.
- Hesperornithidae indet.
- Lingulata indet.
- Mollusca indet.
- Mosasauridae indet.
- Osteichthyes indet.
- Plesiosauria indet.
- Polycotylidae indet.
- Plioplatecarpinae indet.
- Pteranodontidae indet.
- Squalidae indet.
- Teleostei indet.
- Testudinata indet.
- Tylosaurinae indet.
- ?Thoracosaurinae indet.

== See also ==
- List of pterosaur-bearing stratigraphic units
