= Palmula =

Palmula Temporal range: Jurassic – Cretaceous

Scientific classification
- Domain: Eukaryota
- (unranked): SAR
- (unranked): Rhizaria
- Superphylum: Retaria
- Phylum: Foraminifera
- Order: Lagenida
- Superfamily: Nodosarioidea
- Family: Vaginulinidae
- Genus: Palmula Lea, 1833

Extinct genus of single-celled organisms

Palmula is an extinct genus of foraminifera which is known from a number of species found in rocks dating from near the beginning of the Jurassic to the end of the Cretaceous, in Africa, Asia, Europe, and New Zealand. A genus of polycotylid plesiosaur was named Palmula in 2007, but because the name was already in use, the plesiosaur was renamed, becoming Palmulasaurus.
