= Tropic Shale =

Stratigraphic unit in south-central Utah, United States

- Stratigraphic range: Cenomanian to Turonian
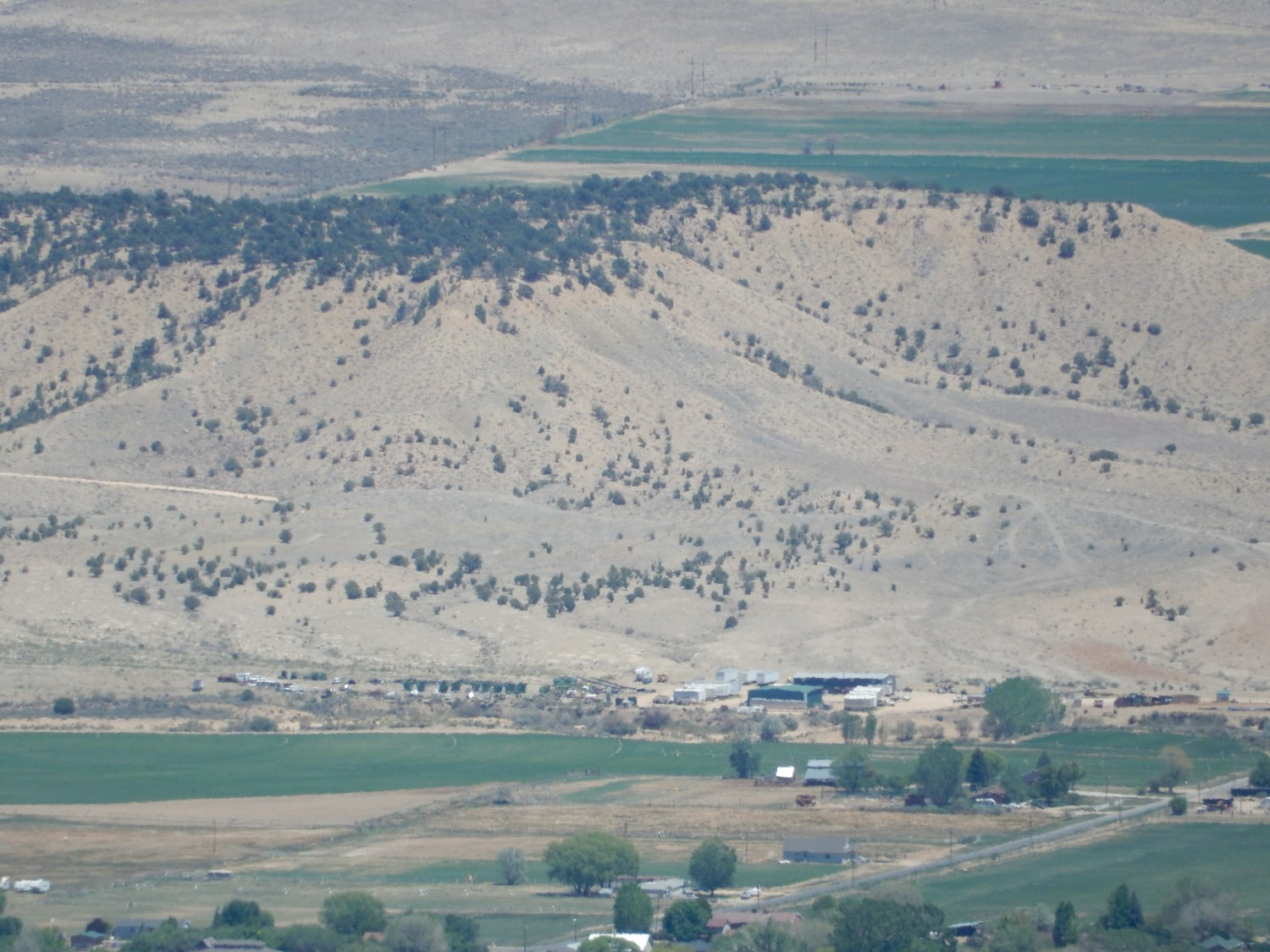
- Tropic Shale at its type location at Tropic, Utah
- Type: Geological formation
- Unit of: Kaiparowits Plateau
- Underlies: Straight Cliffs Formation
- Overlies: Dakota Formation
- Thickness: Maximum 1,450 feet (440 m), average 600 feet (180 m)

Lithology
- Primary: Shale

Location
- Coordinates: 37.629°N 112.076°W
- Region: Utah
- Country: United States

Type section
- Named for: Exposures near Tropic, Garfield County, Utah
- Named by: Gregory and Moore, 1931
- Tropic Shale (the United States) Tropic Shale (Utah)

The Tropic Shale is a Mesozoic geologic formation. Dinosaur remains are among the fossils that have been recovered from the formation, including Nothronychus graffami. The Tropic Shale is a stratigraphic unit of the Kaiparowits Plateau of south central Utah. It was first named in 1931, after the town of Tropic, Utah, where the type section is located. The Tropic Shale outcrops in Kane and Garfield counties, with large sections of exposure found in the Grand Staircase–Escalante National Monument.

== Geology ==
The Tropic Shale is predominantly marine mudstone and claystone, with several radioisotopically-dated bentonite marker beds and occasional sandstone layers, deposited during the late Cretaceous Period, during the Upper Cenomanian through the Middle Turonian (95-92 Ma). It has an average thickness range from 183–274 m.

The Tropic Shale conformity overlies the Dakota Formation and underlies the Straight Cliffs Formation. The top of the Dakota Formation is known for its sandier coarsening up sequences and estuarine shell beds. The distinction between the Tropic Shale and underlying Dakota is marked by the appearance of marine mudstones. In some localities, there is a sharp non conformable contact between the Dakota Formation and Tropic Shale. The contact with the overlying Straight Cliffs is gradational with the distinction between the two units defined as the point where sandstone becomes more abundant than shale.

The Tropic Shale has two dominant lithologies, with the lower two thirds of the formation consisting of a bluish gray calcareous mudstone that encompasses eleven ammonoid biozones. The upper third is a darker gray and non-calcareous, and encompasses only one or two ammonoid biozones. Additionally, the upper portion, hummocky cross stratified and turbiditic sandstone beds become more common.

== Stratigraphy and age ==
The Tropic Shale has been correlated temporally with the Tununk Member of the Mancos Shale in central Utah, the Allen Valley Shale of the western Wasatch Range in Utah, the Mancos Shale exposed at Black Mesa, Arizona, and additionally the Bridge Creek Member of the Greenhorn Limestone at Pueblo, Colorado. Bentonite layers present in all these formations have been correlated throughout deposits associated with the Western Interior Seaway.

Solid and septarian carbonate concretionary nodule horizons are characteristic of the lower and middle parts of the formation informally named as concretionary layer 1-4. The stratigraphically lowest is layer one with the stratigraphically highest being layer 4. Layers 1 and 2 seem to be in isolated sections while layers 3 and 4 seem to have a wide distribution and act as marker beds between Bentonite "A" and "B". The ammonites Sciponoceras gracile and Euomphaloceras septemseriatum are commonly preserved in these concretionary nodules.

The bentonites of the Tropic Shale form erosional benches that can be easily traced throughout the formation. These bentonites have been correlated with other formations that are interpreted as part of the Western Interior Seaway. They are white to light grey when freshly exposed or can have a yellowish discoloration when weathered. The average thickness of these bentonite beds is 1–6 mm. They are organized using a lettered system (A-E) with the lowest stratigraphically positioned bentonite being "A" and the highest stratigraphically positioned bentonite being "E". Several of these bentonites have also been related to known ammonoid biozones. Bentonites "A" and "B" are associated with massive accumulations of clam fossils.

Radioisotopically dated beds:

Bentonite	Date	Error +/-	Correlated Ammonoid Zone
"A"	93.49	0.89	Upper Cenomanian biozone Euomphaloceras septemseriatum
"B"	93.59	0.58	upper Cenomanian biozone of Neocardioceras juddii
"C"	93.25	0.55	Lower Turonia biozone of Vascoceras birchbyi
"D"	93.40	0.63	-
"E"	-	-	-

Ammonite biozones
Genus	Species	Date	Error +/-	Stage
Prionocyclus	hyatti	92.46	0.58	Middle Turonian
Collignoniceras	praecox	-	-	Middle Turonian
Collignoniceras	woollgari	-	-	Middle Turonian
Mammites	nodosoides	-	-	Lower Turonian
Vascoceras	birchbyi	93.48	0.58	Lower Turonian
Pseudoaspidoceras	flexuosum	93.1	0.42	Lower Turonian
Watinoceras	devonense	-	-	Lower Turonian
Nigericeras	scotti	-	-	Upper Cenomanian
Neocardioceras	juddii	93.32 / 93.82	.38 / .3	Upper Cenomanian
Burroceras	clydense	-	-	Upper Cenomanian
Euomphaloceras	septemseriatum	93.68	0.5	Upper Cenomanian
Vascoceras	diartianum	93.99	0.72	Upper Cenomanian

== Paleontology ==
Fossils have been found throughout the entire section of the Tropic Shale. Invertebrates such as ammonites and innoceramid clams seem to dominate. Shark remains consist almost entirely of tooth remains while marine reptiles vary in preservation from isolated fragments to articulated specimens.

The Tropic Shale is known for a wide assortment of marine vertebrates with minor contributions from terrestrial vertebrates. Recovered fossils include sharks, fishes, marine reptiles, turtles and dinosaurs. The marine deposition of vertebrates such as dinosaurs is interpreted as animals being washed out to sea while still alive in a storm event that then drowned or decomposing animals that were washed out to sea in a bloat and float model of transportation.

=== Reptiles ===
==== Dinosaurs ====
Dinosaurs reported from the Tropic Shale
Genus	Species	Presence	Material	Notes	Images
Nothronychus	N. graffami	Kaiparowits Basin, Kane County, Utah.	UMNH VP 16420 (nearly complete postcranial skeleton).	A therizinosaur.	

==== Mosasaurs ====
Mosasaurs reported from the Tropic Shale
Genus	Species	Presence	Material	Notes	Images
Sarabosaurus	S. dahli	GLCA site 327, Glen Canyon National Recreation Area.	Fragments of cranium, mandible, and vertebrae (UMNH VP21800).	A plioplatecarpine.	

==== Plesiosaurs ====
Plesiosaurs reported from the Tropic Shale
Genus	Species	Presence	Material	Notes	Images
Brachauchenius	B. lucasi		Partial skeleton (MNA V9433).	A pliosaurid.	
Eopolycotylus	E. rankini		Partial skeleton (MNA V9445).	A polycotylid.	
Palmulasaurus	P. quadratus		Partial skeleton (MNA V9442).	A polycotylid.	
Scalamagnus	S. tropicensis		Nearly complete specimen with associated gastroliths (MNA V10046).	A polycotylid.	
Trinacromerum	T. ?bentonianum		Multiple specimens.	A polycotylid.	

==== Turtles ====
Turtles reported from the Tropic Shale
Genus	Species	Presence	Material	Notes	Images
Desmatochelys	D. lowi		Partial skeleton (MNA V9446).	A protostegid.	
Naomichelys	N. sp.		Fragmentary carapace & plastron with a limb fragment (MNA V9461).	A helochelydrid.	
Protostegidae Genus et sp. indet.	Indeterminate		MNA V9458.	Provisionally identified as a possible new genus.	

=== Fish ===
==== Bony fish ====
Bony fish reported from the Tropic Shale
Genus	Species	Presence	Material	Notes	Images
Gillicus	G. arcuatus		Nearly complete articulated skeleton (MNA V10081).	An ichthyodectiform.	
Ichthyodectes	I. ctenodon		A specimen with dentaries, 6 vertebrae & skull fragments (MNA V9467).	An ichthyodectid.	
Ichthyodectes	I. sp., cf. I. ctenodon		Fragmentary lower jaw (MNA V9483).	An ichthyodectid.	
Pachyrhizodus	P. leptopsis	Grand Staircase–Escalante National Monument	A disarticulated specimen (MNA V10651).	A crossognathiform.	
Pycnodontoidei	Genus & species undetermined		Premaxillae with dentition (MNA V10076).	A pycnodont.	
Xiphactinus	X. sp., cf. X. audax		Fin, vertebral & skull elements.	An ichthyodectid.	

==== Cartilaginous fish ====
Cartilaginous fish reported from the Tropic Shale
Genus	Species	Presence	Material	Notes	Images
Cretalamna	C. appendiculata		Teeth.	A megatooth shark.	
Cretoxyrhina	C. mantelli		7 teeth.	A mackerel shark.	
Ptychodus	P. anonymus		16 teeth.	A ptychodontid.	
Ptychodus	P. decurrens		Vertebrae & hundreds of teeth.	A ptychodontid.	
Ptychodus	P. occidentalis		4 teeth.	A ptychodontid.	
Ptychodus	P. sp. cf. P. mammillaris		Numerous teeth.	A ptychodontid.	
Ptychodus	P. sp. indet.		A tooth (MNA V9982).	A ptychodontid.	
Ptychodus	P. whipplei		Multiple teeth.	A ptychodontid.	
Ptychotrygon	cf. P. sp.		Partial tooth (MNA V10097).	A sawskate.	
Scapanorhynchus	S. raphiodon		Teeth.	A mitsukurinid.	
Squalicorax	S. curvatus		Multiple teeth.	An anacoracid.	

=== Invertebrates ===
The Tropic Shale is known for its large invertebrate assemblage. Ammonites seem to be major contributors to the ecosystem with oysters and gastropods rounding out the ecosystem. Cold hydrocarbon seeps seem to have their own invertebrate biozone located at the bottom of the formation. Rudists and solitary corals seem to be quite rare and have not been studied due to their lack of presence in the Tropic Shale as they are recorded from other formations associated with the Western Interior Seaway.

Genus	Species	Common name
Callianassa	?sp.	Mud Shrimp
Turritella	?sp	Gastropod
Goniocylichna	?sp	Gastropod
Paleopsephaea	?sp	Gastropod
Toruatellaea	?sp	Gastropod
Preissoptera	prolabiata	Gastropod
Mytiloides	hattini	Bivalve
Nymphalucina	cf. linearia	Bivalve
Solemyid	?sp	Bivalve
Arcoid	?sp	Bivalve
Inoceramus	pictus	Bivalve
Rudistid		Bivalve
Pycnodonte	newberryi	Oyster
Prionocyclus	hyatti	Ammonite
Collignonicras	praecox	Ammonite
Collignonicras	woollgari	Ammonite
Mammites	nodosoides	Ammonite
Vascoceras	birchbyi	Ammonite
Pseudaspidoceras	flexuosum	Ammonite
Watinoceras	devonense	Ammonite
Nigericeras	scotti	Ammonite
Neocardioceras	juddii	Ammonite
Burroceras	clydense	Ammonite
Euomphaloceras	septemseriatum	Ammonite
Vascoceras	diartianum	Ammonite
Sciponoceras	gracile	Ammonite

=== Paleobotany ===
Limited occurrences of petrified wood have been reported in the Tropic Shale. These are interpreted predominately as drift wood that settled to the bottom of the inland seaway.

== Paleoecology ==
During the late Cretaceous, the Western Interior Seaway was occupied by a sea that was regressing by the Turonian. There was a brief transgression, as the estuary like Dakota Formation was replaced by deeper marine shelf deposits. This transgression/regression (named the Greenhorn) cycle lasted about four million years and correlates to an oceanic anoxic event. Evidence of the change is characterized by massive deposits of calcium carbonate in the marine mudstones that can be seen in the upper third of the Tropic Shale when calcium carbonate is absent.

During the late Cretaceous, widespread conditions of oceanic anoxia occurred across the Cenomanian–Turonian (C-T) stage boundary between about 94.2 and 93.5 million years ago (Oceanic Anoxic Event II, OAE II). This Cenomanian–Turonian Boundary Event is reflected by one of the most extreme carbon cycle perturbations in Earth's history. Studies have been done on the marine reptiles to determine the impact of OAE II on the biodiversity of the group in the Western Interior Seaway. Results from that study seem to suggest that, at least locally, the OAE II had little to no effect on marine reptile diversity.

Cold hydrocarbon seep bioherms in the lower portion of the Tropic Shale during the Cenomanian give glimpses of different ecosystems to the marine shelf deposits. These bioherms tend to be around one meter tall and up to three meters wide with large concentrations of invertebrates surrounding the seeps.
