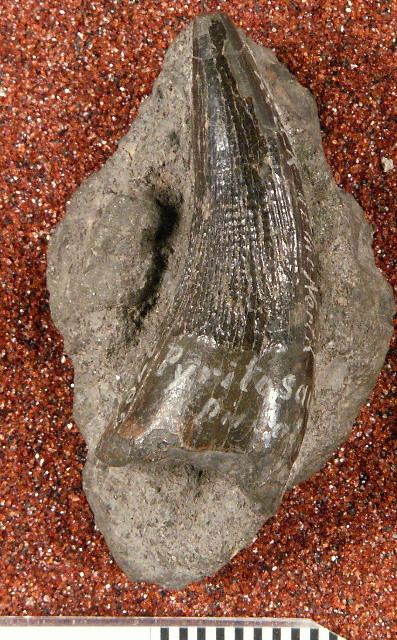
- Holotype tooth USNM V 1000

Scientific classification
- Kingdom: Animalia
- Phylum: Chordata
- Class: Reptilia
- Superorder: †Sauropterygia
- Order: †Plesiosauria
- Genus: †Piratosaurus; Leidy, 1865

Type species
- †Piratosaurus plicatus Leidy, 1865

Synonyms
- Pyritosaurus (sic)

= Piratosaurus =

Piratosaurus Temporal range: Late Cretaceous

Extinct genus of reptiles

Piratosaurus (meaning "pirate lizard") is a dubious genus of plesiosaur possibly belonging to the Polycotylidae that is known exclusively from the type species P. plicatus, named and described by Joseph Leidy in 1865. It is known only from the holotype, USNM V 1000, a tooth, discovered in Late Cretaceous-aged rocks in the Red River basin of Manitoba; at least one researcher erroneously assumed it was found in Minnesota.

== See also ==
- List of plesiosaur genera
- Timeline of plesiosaur research
