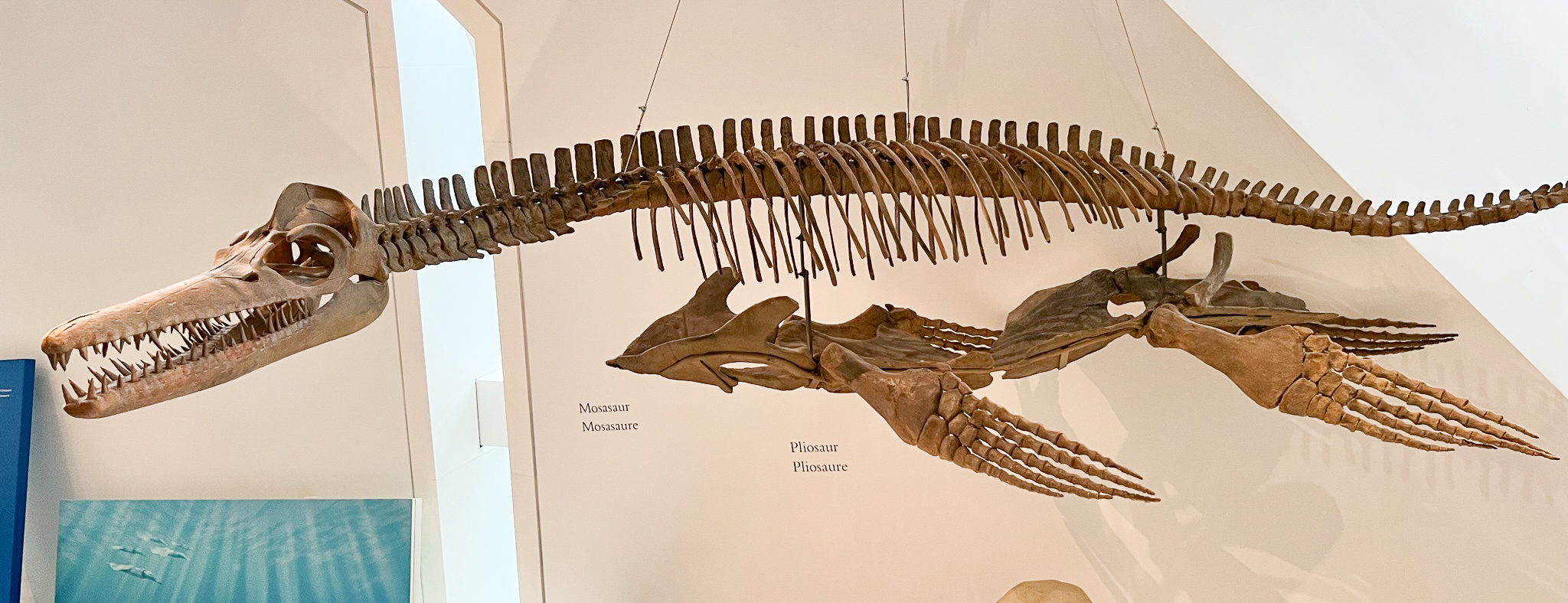
- Mounted T. kirki cast at the Royal Ontario Museum

Scientific classification
- Kingdom: Animalia
- Phylum: Chordata
- Class: Reptilia
- Superorder: †Sauropterygia
- Order: †Plesiosauria
- Superfamily: †Plesiosauroidea
- Family: †Polycotylidae
- Genus: †Trinacromerum; Cragin, 1888

Species
- †T. bentonianum Cragin, 1888 (type); †T. kirki Russell, 1935

= Trinacromerum =

Trinacromerum Temporal range: Late Cretaceous

Extinct genus of reptiles

Trinacromerum is an extinct genus of sauropterygian reptile, a member of the polycotylid plesiosaurs. It contains two species, T. bentonianum and T. kirki. Specimens have been discovered in the Late Cretaceous fossil deposits of what is now modern Kansas and Manitoba. Some fossils are also found in the Southern United States such as in the Mooreville Chalk of Alabama.

== Description ==
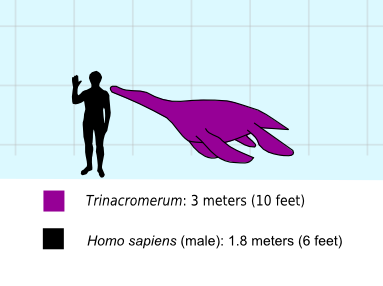
Trinacromerum with a human to scale

Trinacromerum was 3 meters (9.8 feet) long. Its teeth show that it fed on small fish.

The long flippers of Trinacromerum enabled it to achieve high swimming speeds. Its physical appearance was described by Richard Ellis as akin to a "four-flippered penguin." Its name means "three tipped femur".

== Classification ==
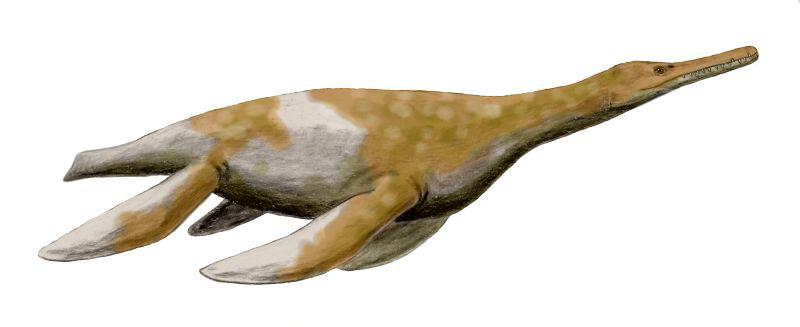
T. bentonianum life restoration

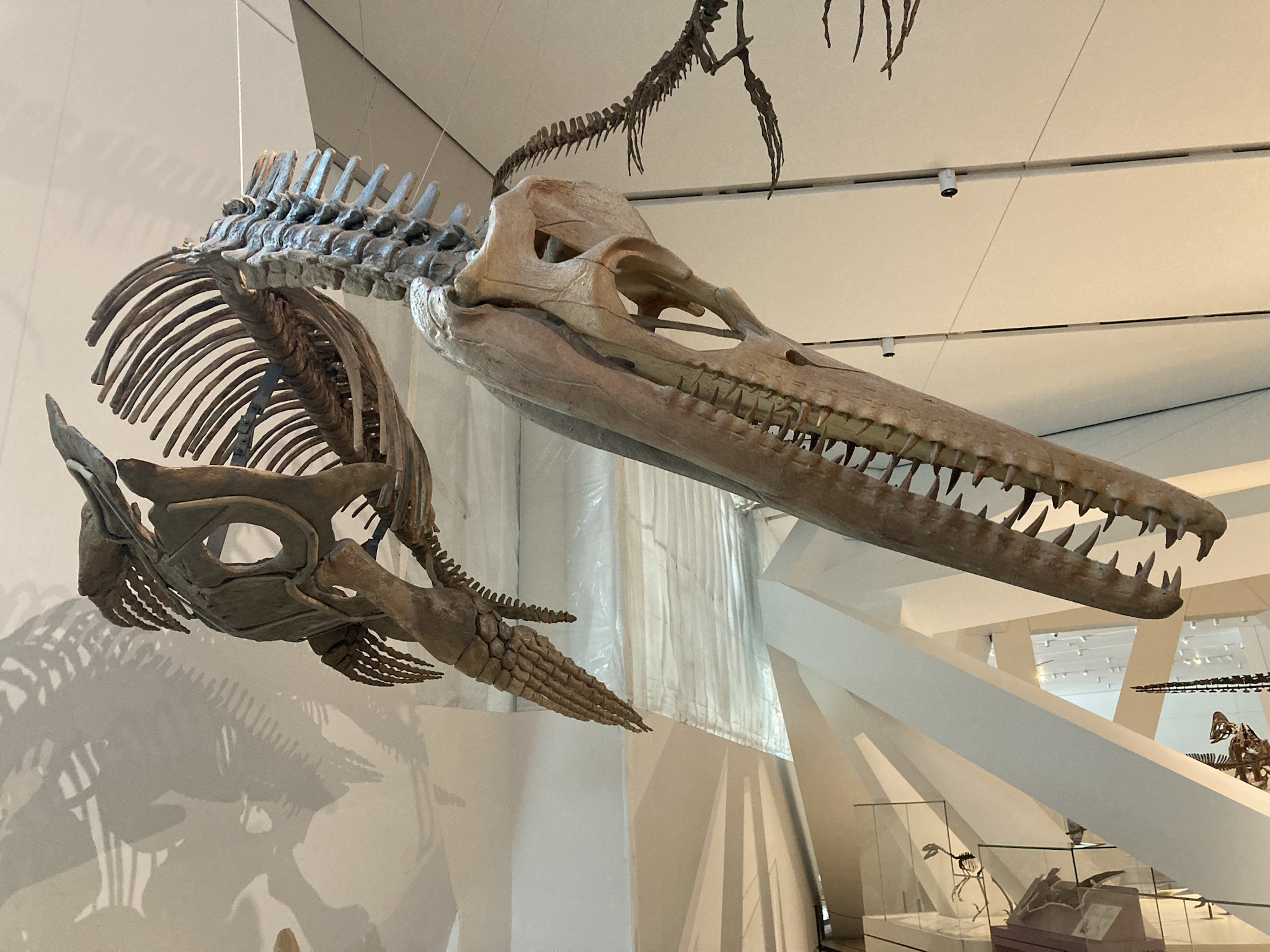
Mounted skeleton at Royal Ontario Museum

Below is a cladogram of polycotylid relationships from Ketchum & Benson, 2011.

- Plesiosauroidea
  - Cryptoclididae
  - Leptocleidia
    - Leptocleididae
    - Polycotylidae
      - Edgarosaurus
      - - - Plesiopleurodon
          - QM F18041
        - - - Eopolycotylus
            - Polycotylus
            - Thililua
          - - Trinacromerum
            - - Manemergus
              - - Dolichorhynchops herschelensis
                - - Dolichorhynchops
                  - Palmulasaurus

== See also ==
- List of plesiosaur genera
- Timeline of plesiosaur research
