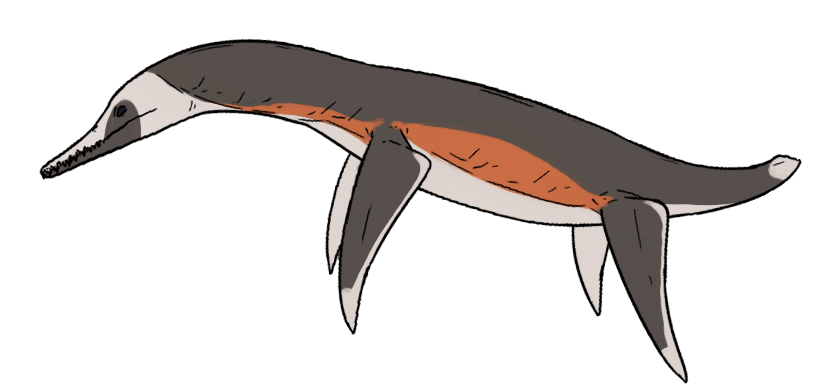
- Speculative life restoration

Scientific classification
- Kingdom: Animalia
- Phylum: Chordata
- Class: Reptilia
- Superorder: †Sauropterygia
- Order: †Plesiosauria
- Superfamily: †Plesiosauroidea
- Family: †Polycotylidae
- Genus: †Pahasapasaurus; Schumacher, 2007

Type species
- †Pahasapasaurus haasi Schumacher, 2007

Other species
- †Pahasapasaurus gillettei Schmeisser McKean, 2025

= Pahasapasaurus =

Pahasapasaurus Temporal range: Late Cretaceous, late Cenomanian–Turonian

Genus of polycotylid plesiosaurs

Pahasapasaurus is an extinct genus of polycotylid plesiosaurs from Late Cretaceous rocks of the United States. Distinctive features of the taxon include elongate epipodial bones (radius/ulna - tibia/fibula) and the nature of the palate bones (roof of the mouth). The genus contains two species; type species, Pahasapasaurus haasi, was named in 2007 based on remains from the late Cenomanian-aged Greenhorn Limestone of South Dakota, In 2025, a second species was named, Pahasapasaurus gillettei, based on a complete skull and partial skeleton from the early Turonian-aged Tropic Shale of Utah.

In August 1934, entrepreneur Charles Christian Haas and his son Arthur while searching for shark teeth discovered a plesiosaur skeleton near the Maloney Creek, south of the Belle Fourche River in the northern Black Hills. They collected and partially prepared the specimen, studying the relevant scientific literature to better understand the bones and documenting the dig via photographs and matrix samples. A report was written, published by the Science Service Bureau. Haas hoped to sell the specimen to some museum but when no buyer showed interest, he donated it to the Pioneer Museum at Deadwood, the present Adams Museum & House. By 1937 it had been identified as Trinacromerum bentonianum by Stephen Chapman Simms, the director of the Field Museum.

In 1996, museum director Mary Kopco, in cooperation with the Haas family, decided to restore the specimen. Dr Gordon Bell of the South Dakota School of Mines and Technology in Rapid City headed the project which was actually carried out by his student Bruce Schumacher. Schumacher quickly concluded from the morphology of the fins that it was not Trinacromerum but a species new to science which he reported in 1997. Preparation continued in a Disney World laboratory open to the public. Parts of the vertebral column were still covered by sugar sacks and paste. From the other bones thick layers of shellac had to be removed. Ultimately, the fossil was again exhibited in the AMM.

In 2007, Schumacher named Pahasapasaurus haasi, establishing AMM 98.1.1, a partial skeleton with skull and lower jaws, as the holotype. The generic name is derived from Paha Sapa, meaning "Black Hills" in the Sioux language. This name was chosen by the Haas family, because Charles Haas had always been interested in the Lakota archeology of the Black Hills. The specific name honours C.C. Haas as discoverer.

== See also ==
- List of plesiosaur genera
- List of plesiosaurs
- Timeline of plesiosaur research
