= Eostriatolamia =

Scientific classification
- Domain: Eukaryota
- Kingdom: Animalia
- Phylum: Chordata
- Class: Chondrichthyes
- Subclass: Elasmobranchii
- Division: Selachii
- Order: Lamniformes
- Family: Odontaspididae
- Genus: †Eostriatolamia; Glikman 1980

Species
- †Eostriatolamia paucicorrugata Underwood and Cumbaa 2010; †Eostriatolamia segedini Glickman and Zhelezko 1979; †Eostriatolamia striatula Dalinkevičius 1935; †Eostriatolamia subulata Agassiz 1843; †Eostriatolamia tenuiplicatus Cappetta and Case 1975; †Eostriatolamia venusta Leriche 1906

Extinct genus of sharks

Eostriatolamia is an extinct genus of sharks in the family Odontaspididae. It was described by Gluckman in 1980. A new species, E. paucicorrugata, was described from the Cenomanian of Canada by Charlie J. Underwood and Stephen L. Cumbaa in 2010.

== Species ==
- Eostriatolamia aktobensis Zhelezko, 1987
- Eostriatolamia lerichei Glikman & Zhelezko in Zhelezko, 1977
- Eostriatolamia paucicorrugata Underwood & Cumbaa, 2010
- Eostriatolamia segedini Glikman & Zhelezko in Zhelezko, 1977
- Eostriatolamia venusta Leriche, 1906
- Eostriatolamia subulata (Agassiz, 1844)
