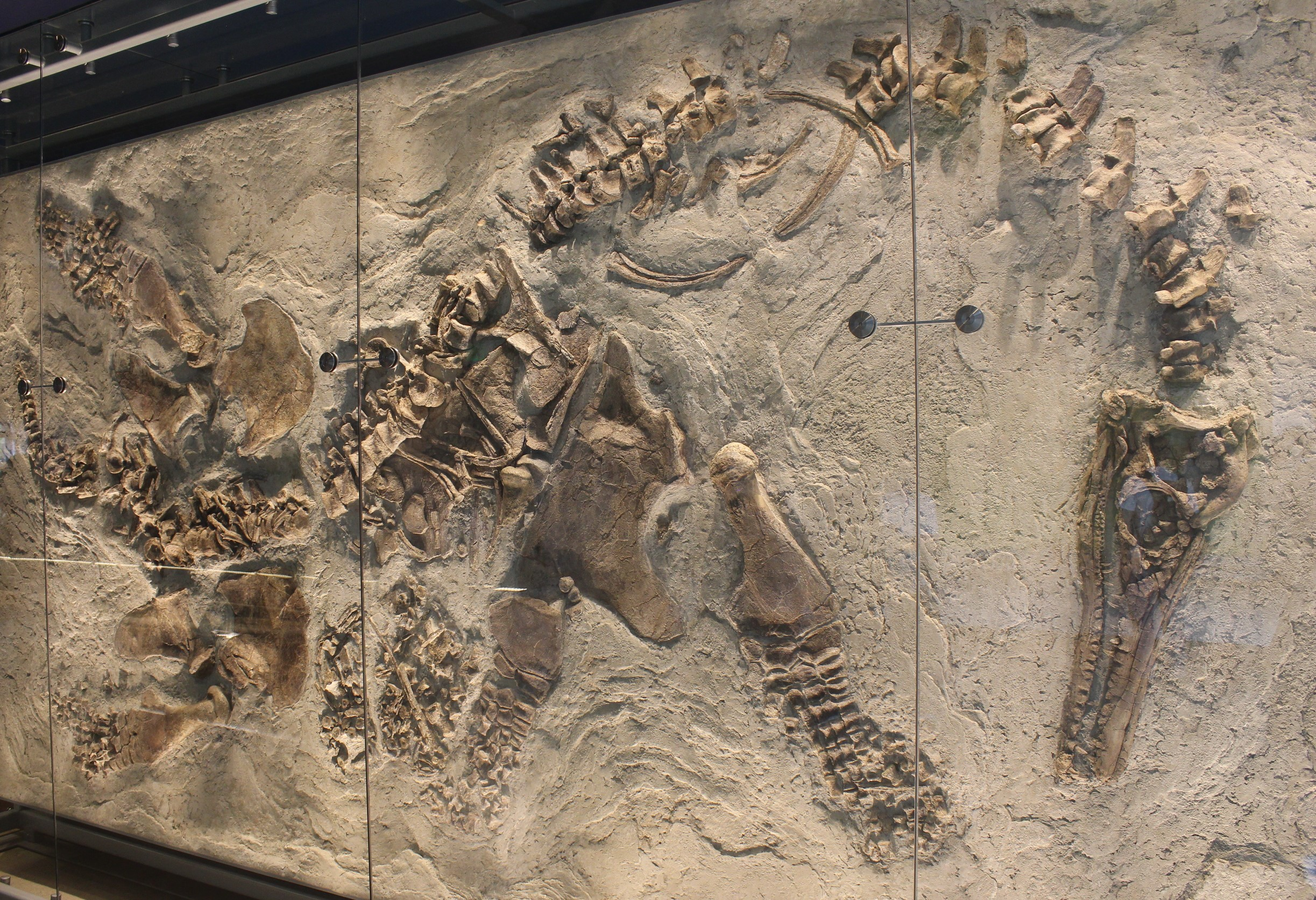
- Pregnant Polycotylus latipinnis specimen (LACM 129639), Natural History Museum of Los Angeles County.

Scientific classification
- Kingdom: Animalia
- Phylum: Chordata
- Class: Reptilia
- Superorder: †Sauropterygia
- Order: †Plesiosauria
- Superfamily: †Plesiosauroidea
- Family: †Polycotylidae
- Subfamily: †Polycotylinae
- Genus: †Polycotylus; Cope, 1869

Type species
- †Polycotylus latipinnis Cope, 1869

Species
- †P. latipinnis Cope, 1869; †P. sopozkoi Elphimov et al., 2016

= Polycotylus =

Polycotylus Temporal range: 83.6 Ma

Extinct genus of reptiles

Polycotylus is a genus of plesiosaur within the family Polycotylidae. The type species is P. latippinis and was named by American paleontologist Edward Drinker Cope in 1869. Eleven other species have been identified. The name means 'much-cupped vertebrae', referring to the shape of the vertebrae. It lived in the Western Interior Seaway of North America toward the end of the Cretaceous. One fossil preserves an adult with a single large fetus inside of it, indicating that Polycotylus gave live birth, an unusual adaptation among reptiles.

== History ==
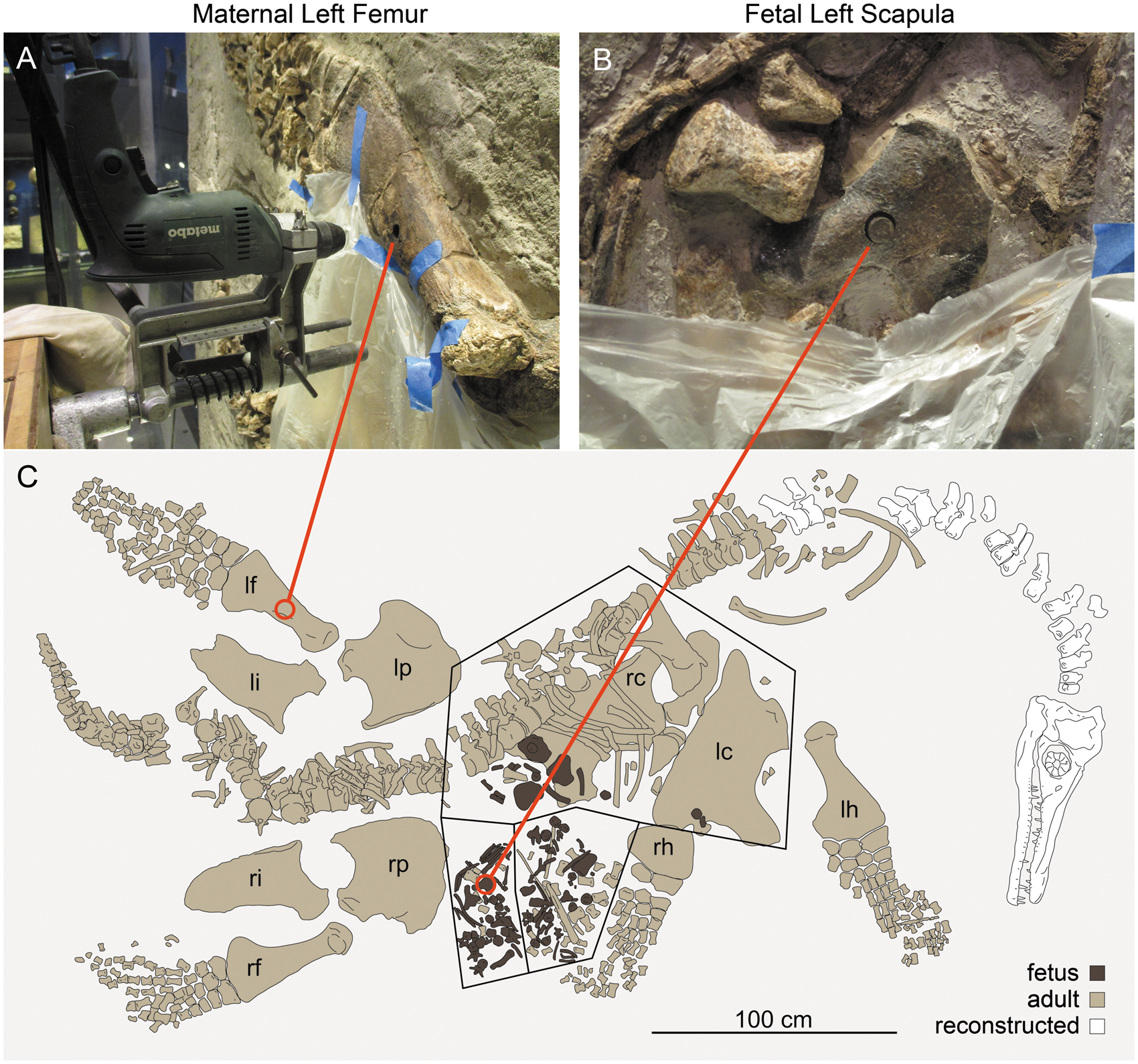
Diagram showing the pregnant specimen and fetus (black) and reconstructed parts (white)

Edward Drinker Cope named Polycotylus from the Niobrara Formation in Kansas in 1869. The holotype bones from which he based his description were fragmentary, representing only a small portion of the skeleton. A more complete skeleton was later found in Kansas and was described in 1906. A nearly complete skeleton was found in 1949 from the Mooreville Chalk Formation in Alabama, but was not described until 2002. A new species, P. sopozkoi, from Russia was described in 2016.

== Description ==
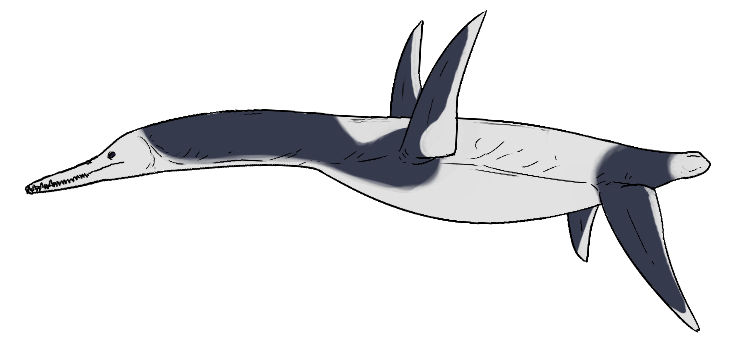
Life restoration

Like all plesiosaurs, Polycotylus has a short tail, large flippers, and a broad body. It has a short neck and a long head, and was a medium-sized plesiosaur, with the type species (P. latipinnis) measuring 4.7–5.4 metres (15–18 ft) long and weighing over 1 metric ton (1.1 short tons). It has more neck vertebrae than other polycotylids, however. Polycotylus is thought to be a basal polycotylid because it has more vertebrae in its neck (a feature that links it with long-necked ancestors) and its humerus has a more primitive shape. The long ischia of the pelvis are a distinguishing feature of Polycotylus, as are thick teeth with striations on their surfaces, a narrow pterygoid bone on the palate and a low sagittal crest on top of the skull.

== Classification ==
Unlike some better-known long-necked plesiosaurs like Plesiosaurus and Elasmosaurus, Polycotylus had a short neck. This led to it being classified as a pliosaur, a marine reptile within the superfamily Pliosauroidea, closely related to true plesiosaurs (which belong to the superfamily Plesiosauroidea). Polycotylus and other polycotylids superficially resemble pliosaurs like Liopleurodon and Peloneustes because they have short necks, large heads, and other proportions that differ from true plesiosaurs.

As phylogenetic analyses became common in the last few decades, the classification of Polycotylus and other plesiosaurs have been revised. In 1997, it and other polycotylids were reassigned as close relatives of long-necked elasmosaurids. In a 2001 study, Polycotylus was classified as a derived cryptocleidoid plesiosaur closely related to Jurassic plesiosaurs like Cryptocleidus. Below is a cladogram from a 2004 study which supported a similar classification:

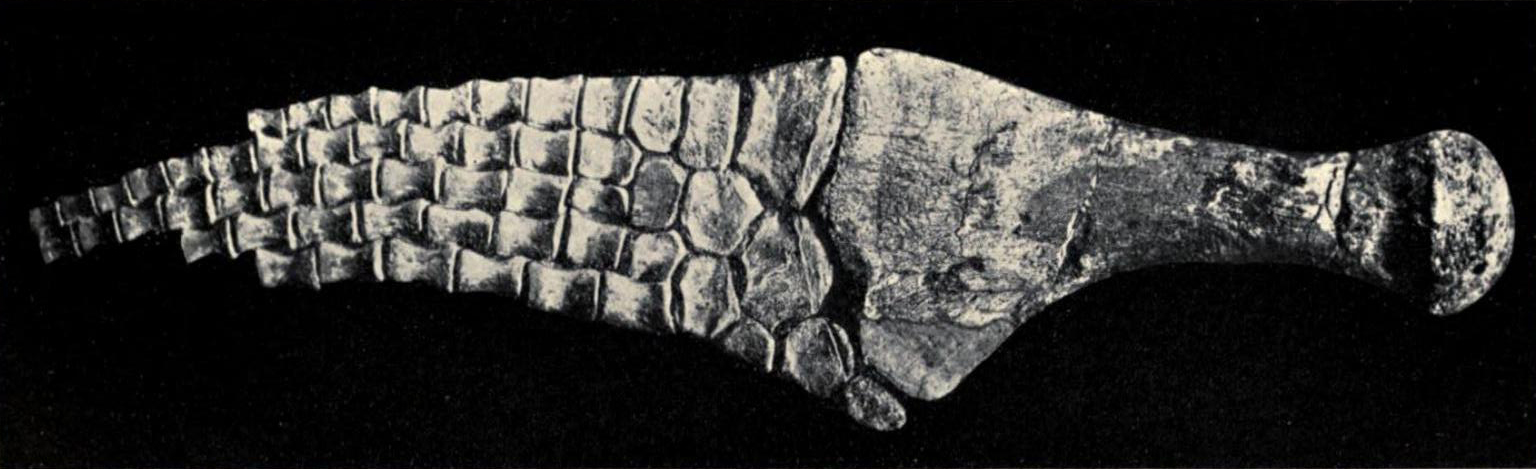
Photograph of a paddle of P. latipinnis (1903)

- Plesiosauroidea
  - Plesiosaurus
  - - Brancasaurus
    - Cryptocleidoidea
      - Muraenosaurus
      - Cryptocleidus
      - - Tricleidus
        - - Cimoliasauridae
          - Polycotylidae
            - Polycotylus
            - Edgarosaurus
            - - Dolichorhynchops
              - Trinacromerum

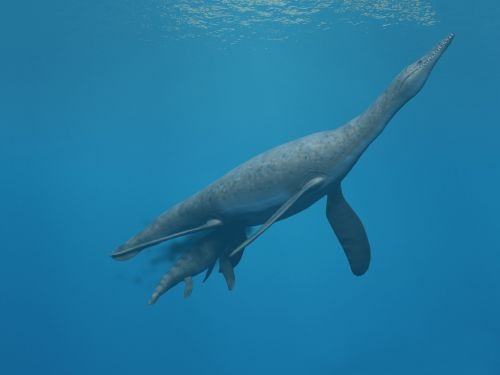
Life restoration of an individual giving birth

In 2007, Polycotylus was placed in a new subfamily of polycotylids called Polycotylinae. Another newly described polycotylid called Eopolycotylus from Glen Canyon, Utah, was found to be the closest relative of Polycotylus. Below is a cladogram from the 2007 study:

- Plesiosauroidea
  - Plesiosaurus
  - Tricleidus
  - Polycotylidae
    - Thililua
    - - Palmulasaurinae
        - Palmula
        - UMUT MV 19965
      - Polycotylinae
        - Dolichorhynchops
        - - Trinacromerum
          - - Polycotylus
            - Eopolycotylus

== Paleobiology ==
=== Reproduction ===
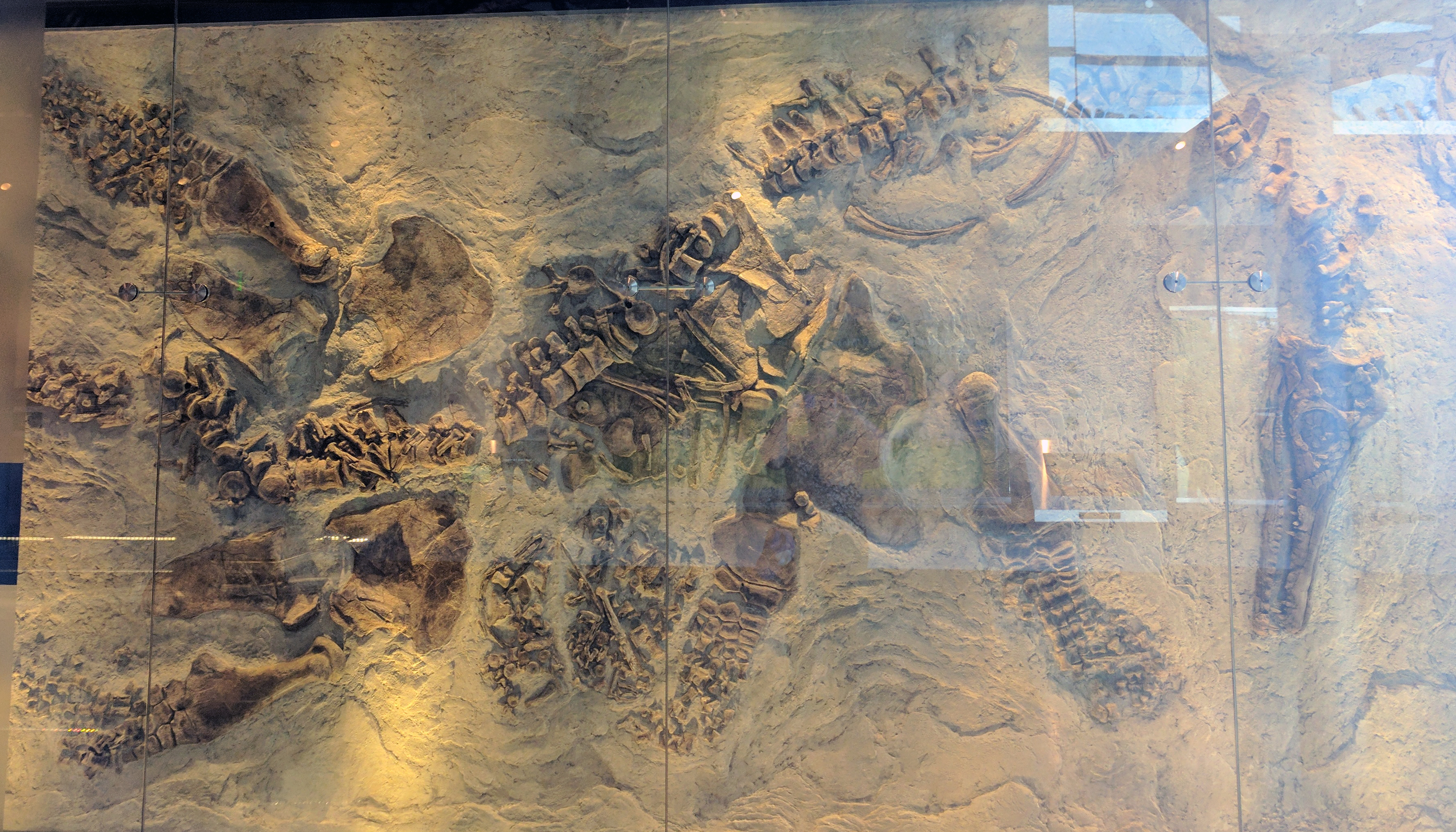
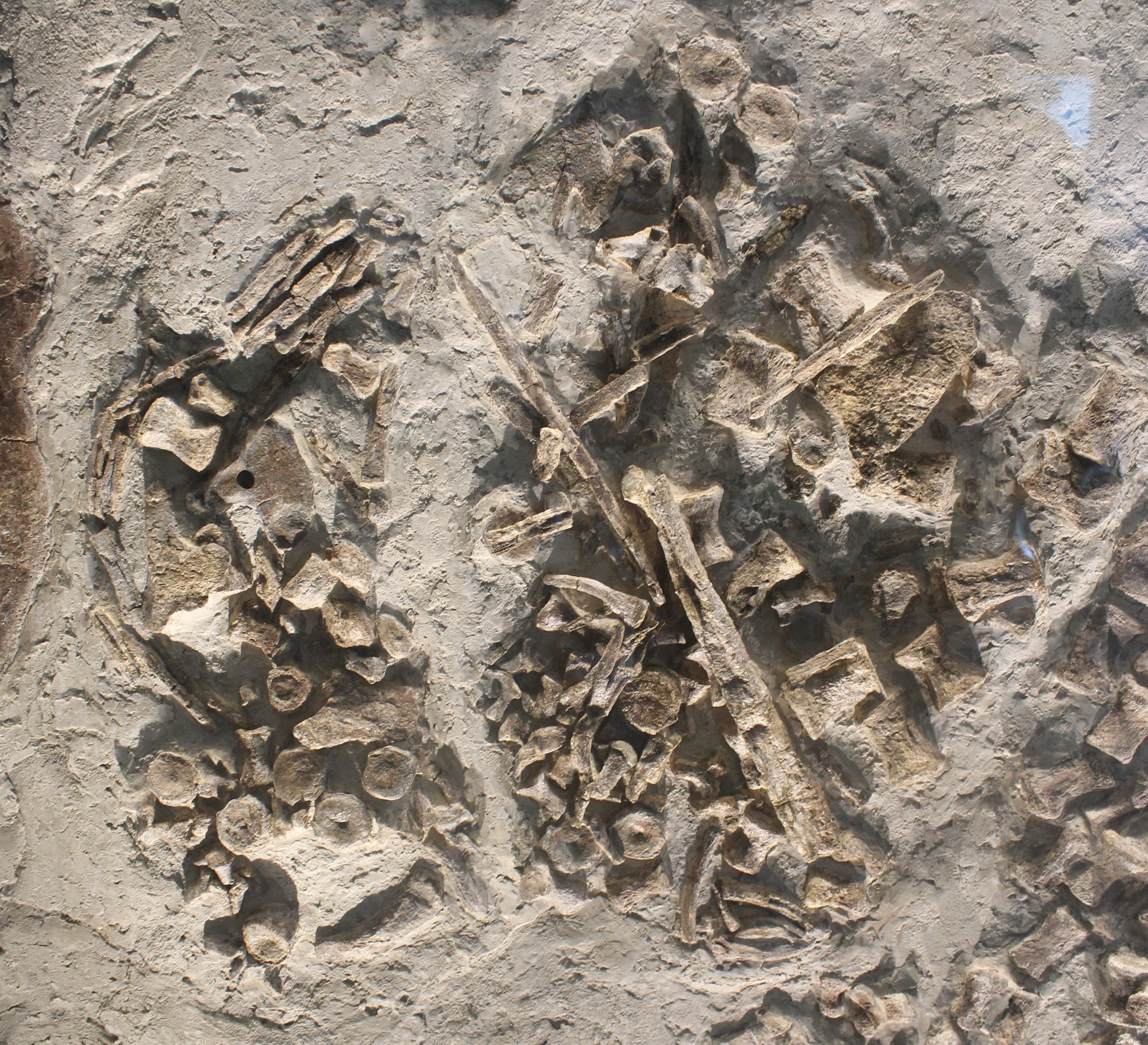
The pregnant specimen (above) and close up of the fetus

A fossil of P. latippinis catalogued LACM 129639 includes an adult individual with a single fetus inside it. LACM 129639 was found in Kansas during the 1980s and was in storage at the Natural History Museum of Los Angeles County until it was described in 2011. The length of the fetus is around 1.5 m (4.9 ft), which is about 32 percent of the length of the mother. Gestation was probably two thirds complete based on what is known of the fetal development of related nothosaurs. This fossil suggests that Polycotylus was viviparous, giving live birth (as opposed to laying eggs).

Viviparity, or live birth, may have been the most common form of reproduction in plesiosaurs, as they would have had difficulty laying eggs on land. Their bodies are not adapted to movement on land, and paleontologists have long hypothesized that they must have given birth in water. Other marine reptiles such as ichthyosaurs also gave live birth, but LACM 129639 was the first direct evidence of vivipary in plesiosaurs. The lives of Polycotylus and other plesiosaurs were K-selected, meaning that few offspring were born to each individual but those that were born were cared for as they mature. Because it gave birth to a single large offspring, the mother Polycotylus probably gave it some form of parental care for it to survive. F. Robin O'Keefe, one of the describers of LACM 129639, suggested that the social lives of plesiosaurs were "more similar to those of modern dolphins than other reptiles." K-selected life-history strategies are also seen in mammals and some lizards, but are unusual among reptiles.

Examination of the fetus of Polycotylus indicates that while in the womb, plesiosaurs sacrificed fetal bone strength for accelerated growth rates. Histological analysis and comparisons with another plesiosaur, Dolichorhynchops, showed that some plesiosaur infants were up to forty percent the length of the mother when born, and that infant plesiosaurs may have had some compromised swimming abilities.

== See also ==
- List of plesiosaur genera
- Timeline of plesiosaur research
