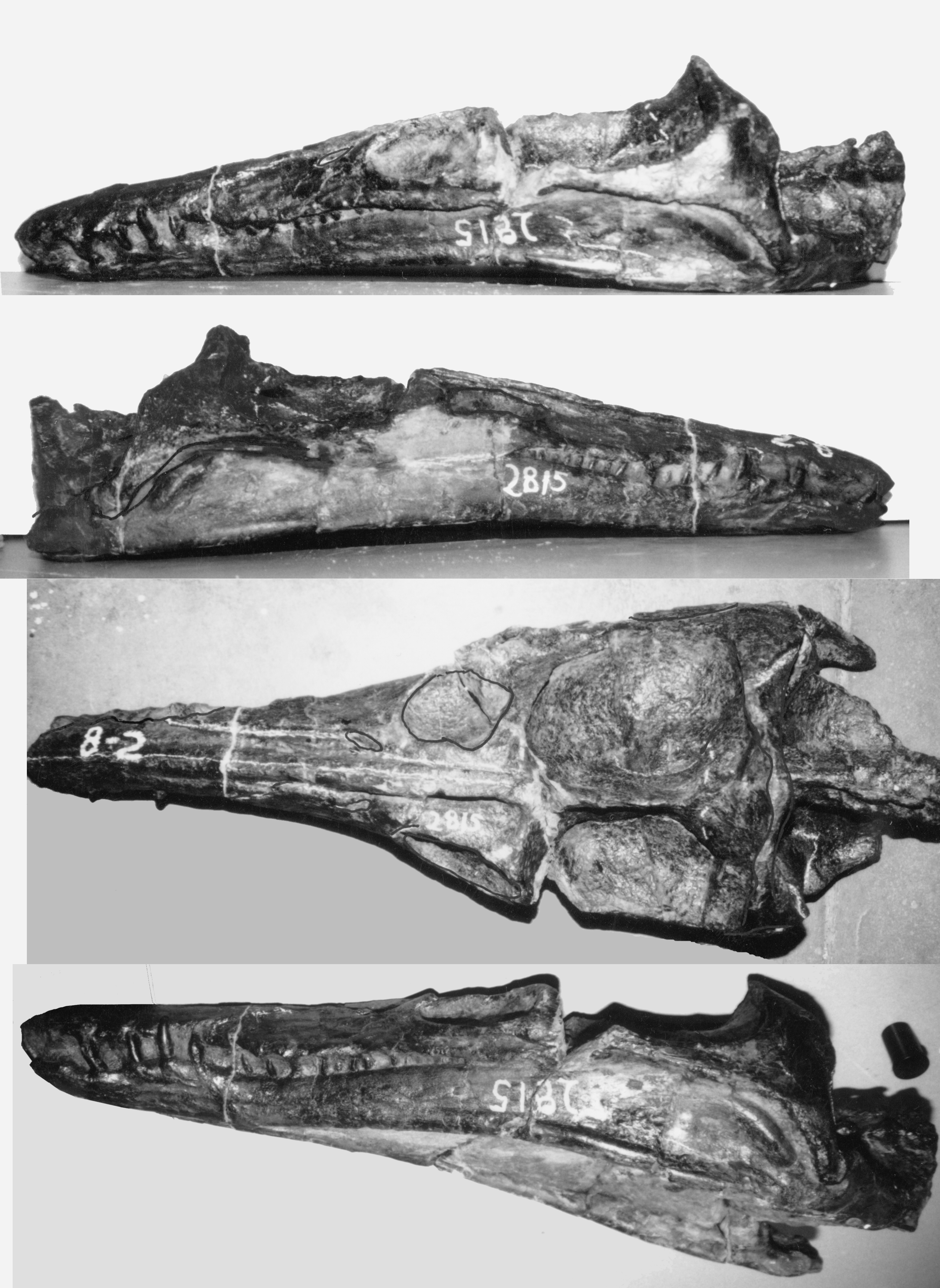
- Holotype skull of Plesiopleurodon wellesi

Scientific classification
- Kingdom: Animalia
- Phylum: Chordata
- Class: Reptilia
- Superorder: †Sauropterygia
- Order: †Plesiosauria
- Superfamily: †Plesiosauroidea
- Family: †Polycotylidae
- Genus: †Plesiopleurodon; Carpenter, 1996

Species
- †P. wellesi Carpenter, 1996 (type species)

= Plesiopleurodon =

Plesiopleurodon Temporal range: Late Cretaceous, 98 Ma

Extinct genus of reptiles

Plesiopleurodon (/ˌpliːsiəˈplʊərədɒn/; Greek: plesios, meaning "near to", pleuro, meaning "side", and don, meaning "tooth") is an extinct genus of Mesozoic marine reptiles, belonging to the Sauropterygia, known from the Late Cretaceous of North America. It was named by Kenneth Carpenter based on a complete skull with a mandible, cervical vertebra, and a coracoid. In naming the specimen, Carpenter noted "Of all known pliosauroids, Plesiopleurodon wellesi most closely resembles Liopleurodon ferox from the Oxfordian of Europe, hence the generic reference." It was initially described as a pliosauroid due to it short neck, a common trait of the superfamily (although it is in the order Plesiosauria). However, later exploration into the relationships of both groups indicate that not all pliosauroids have short necks and not all plesiosauroids have long necks. Later research indicates it is a member of the Polycotylidae, within the clade Occultonectia.

It is distinguishable by its short neck, elongated head, and comparatively few teeth in the symphysis when compared to other plesiosaurs.

== History of discovery ==
The holotype, CM 2815, origin is uncertain, the original paper says it is from Belle Fourche Shale in the Rattlesnake Hills of Wyoming (lower Cenomanian), but the Carnegie Museum collections data says its from the Hailey Shales Formation. Regardless of its origin, it seems to be the only known fossil of Plesiopleurodon.

== Description ==
=== Skull and dentition ===
The skull is 71.2 cm long. The roof was slightly crushed and a parietal is damaged, but is otherwise in good condition. The premaxilla forms the dorsal edge of the external naris, like Pliosaurus and Rhomaleosaurus. In Liopleurodon ferox, the premaxilla does not share this connection. Like L. ferox, the premaxillaries separate the frontals. The temporal fenestra is longer than it is wide. It retains the primitive plesiosaur feature of posterior sloping of the skull. The quadrate is firmly attached, unlike the attachments seen in most polycotylids. The orbit has a reniform, or kidney-like, shape caused by posterior extension of the maxilla toward the prefrontals. The pre-orbital skull length ratio is high, indicating a longer snout than other polycotylids. The postorbital bar is reduced.

The dentary has many ridges and valleys, becoming especially prominent near the enlarged caniniform teeth. The tooth margin alternates between concave and convex on the dentary. 19 teeth are in the dentaries, but there may be more that are not visible due to presence of the matrix it was mostly uncovered from. The eight caniniform teeth are procumbent, or tilt forward, and smooth but are striated near where they attach to the jaw. The skull was not prepared in such a way that allows for examination of the palate.

=== Postcrania ===
The cervical vertebrae are slightly wider than long and have equal lengths and heights. Like other Cretaceous pliosaurs, the cervical ribs have one head.

The coracoid has a long interpectoral bar that is longer than any seen in Jurassic pliosaurs.

== Classification ==
How Plesiopleurdon wellesi has been classified within Plesiosauria has varied historically, with this taxon initially being placed within Pliosauridae. However, later authors have since classified Plesiopleurodon as a polycotylid. Fischer and colleagues, in 2018, named a new clade, Occultonectia, to include Plesiopleurodon, the 'Richmond pliosaur' (museum number QM F18041), and Sulcusuchus erraini.

== Paleobiogeography ==
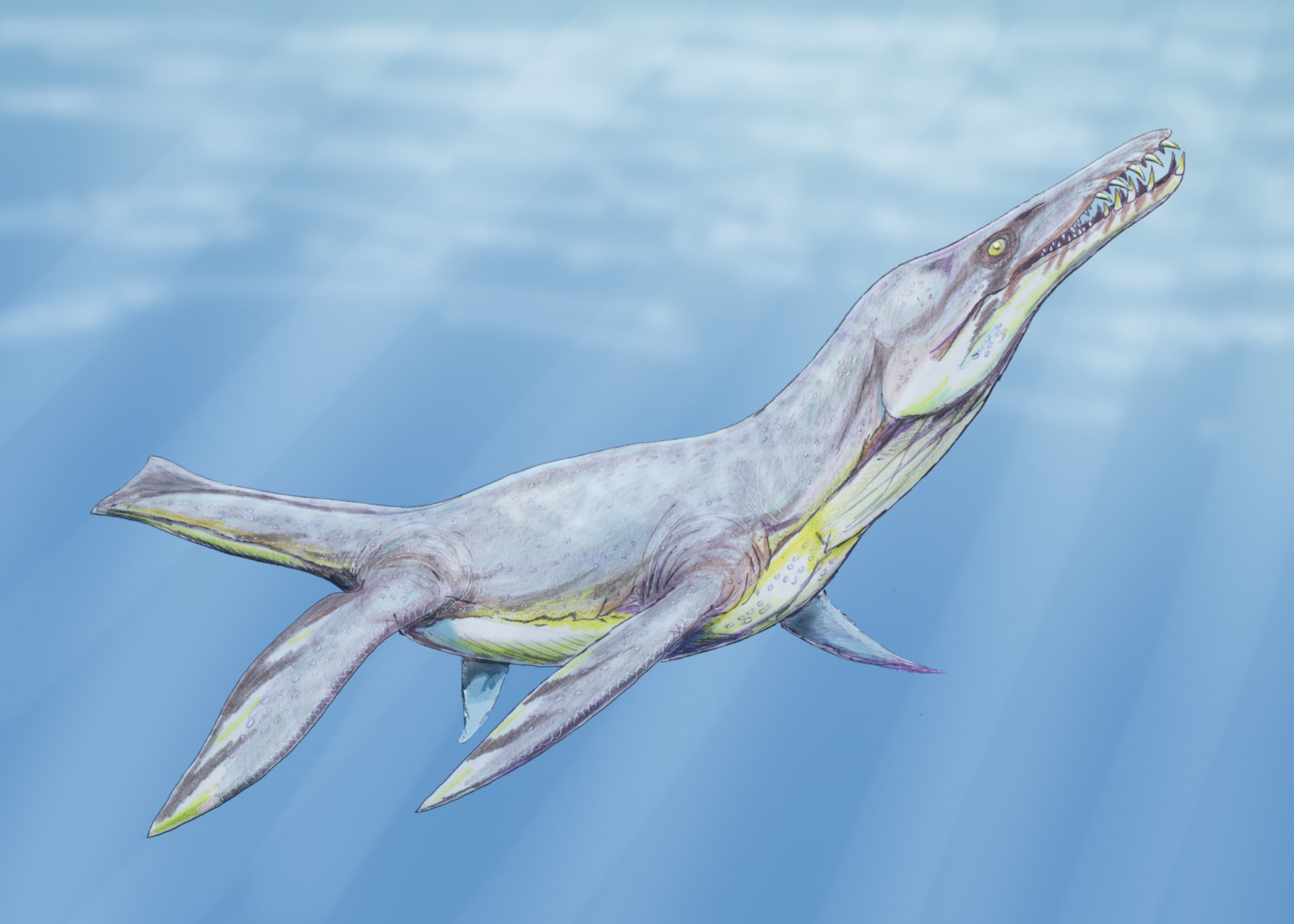
Restoration

The earliest plesiosaurs are solely found in the Northern hemisphere but diversified in the Jurassic. By the Early Jurassic, they are regarded as cosmopolitan and are primarily known from the Tethys Realm of Europe and China. This widespread distribution coincides with a global sea level rise and the breakup of Pangaea, allowing for marine corridors to be used for dispersal.

Plesiopleurodon, like all plesiosaurs, are obligatory aquatic animals that rely on paraxial propulsion to swim. This means locomotion depends on the propulsion from paddle-like flippers, much like how sea turtles move.

== Geographic and stratigraphic range ==
The Belle Fourche Shale of northeastern Wyoming has about 400 to 800 feet of noncalcareous shale between the siliceous Mowry Shale below and the calcareous Greenhorn Formation above. It contains large ironstone concretions in the lower 50 feet of the formation. Bentonite beds are present throughout the shale. Of the shale that extends into Alberta, the formation primarily consists of shale, siltstone, and sandstone. The sandstones in southeastern Alberta and southwestern Saskatchewan are shallow gas reservoirs.

While the Belle Fourche Shale is dated to the Cenomian, most of the fossils discovered there are from the uppermost portion, more than 500 feet above the base of the formation. The primary fossils found include many species of ammonites and foraminifera, with few significant macrofossils.

== See also ==
- List of plesiosaur genera
- Timeline of plesiosaur research
- Liopleurodon
- Plesiosauroidea
- Polycotylidae
