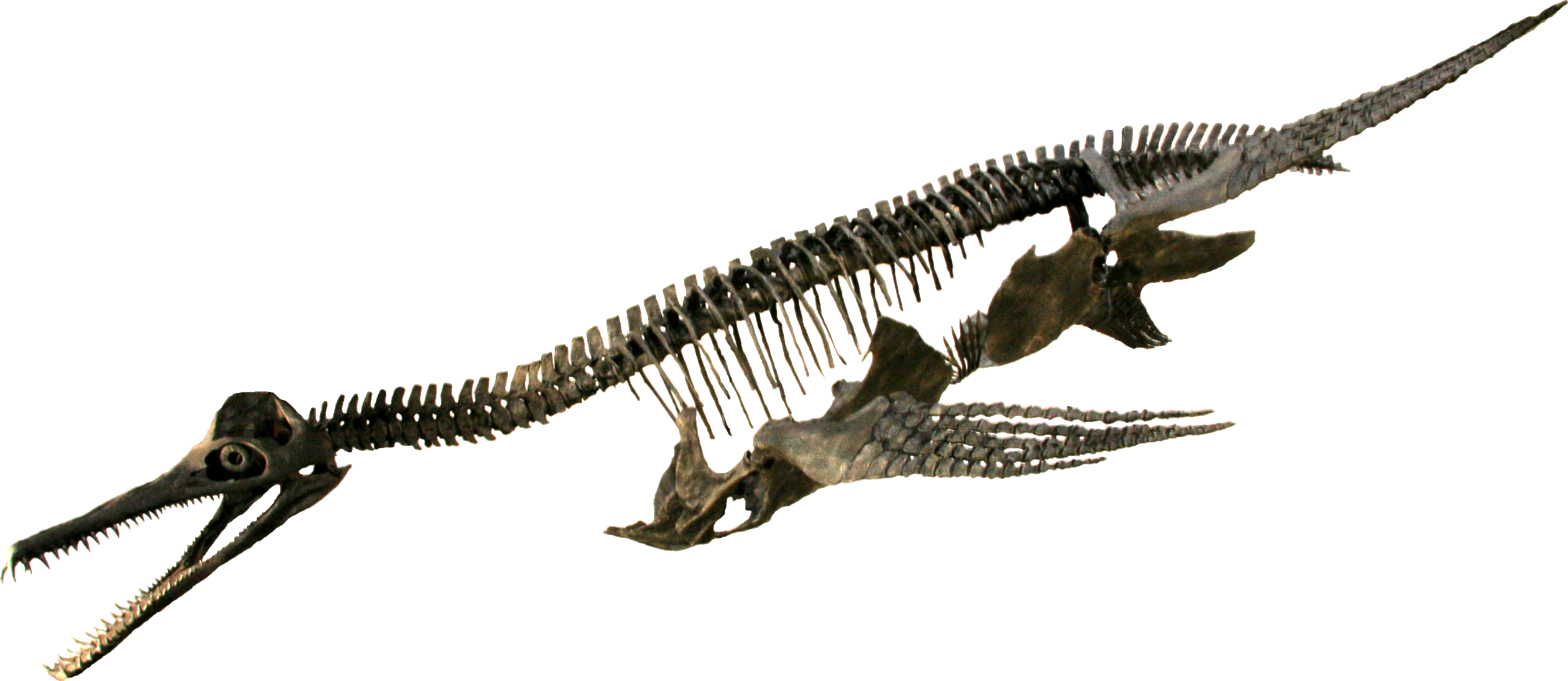
- Martinectes in the Rocky Mountain Dinosaur Resource Center
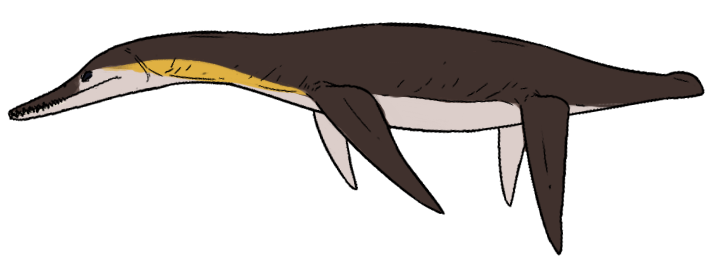
- Life restoration of Sulcusuchus erraini

Scientific classification
- Kingdom: Animalia
- Phylum: Chordata
- Class: Reptilia
- Superorder: †Sauropterygia
- Order: †Plesiosauria
- Superfamily: †Plesiosauroidea
- Clade: †Leptocleidia
- Family: †Polycotylidae; Williston, 1909

Genera
- †Edgarosaurus; †Manemergus; †Mauriciosaurus; †Piratosaurus?; †Rarosaurus?; †Thililua; †Occultonectia; †Plesiopleurodon; †Sulcusuchus; †Palmulasaurinae; †Pahasapasaurus; †Palmulasaurus; †Polycotylinae; †Eopolycotylus; †Georgiasaurus; †Polycotylus; †Scalamagnus; †Serpentisuchops; †Trinacromerum; †Dolichorhynchia; †Dolichorhynchops; †Martinectes; †Unktaheela

= Polycotylidae =

Polycotylids Temporal range: Early - Late Cretaceous, 113–66 Ma

Extinct family of reptiles

Polycotylidae is a family of plesiosaurs from the Cretaceous. Polycotylids first appeared during the Albian stage of the Early Cretaceous, before becoming abundant and widespread during the early Late Cretaceous. Several species survived into the final stage of the Cretaceous, the Maastrichtian, around 72-66 million years ago. The possible latest surviving member Rarosaurus from the late Maastrichtian is more likely a crocodylomorph.

With their short necks and large elongated heads, they resemble the pliosaurs, but phylogenetic studies indicate that they are plesiosauroids, being most closely related to Leptocleididae and more distantly to Elasmosauridae. They have been found worldwide, with specimens reported from New Zealand, Australia, Japan, Morocco, the United States, Canada, Eastern Europe, and South America.

== Phylogeny ==
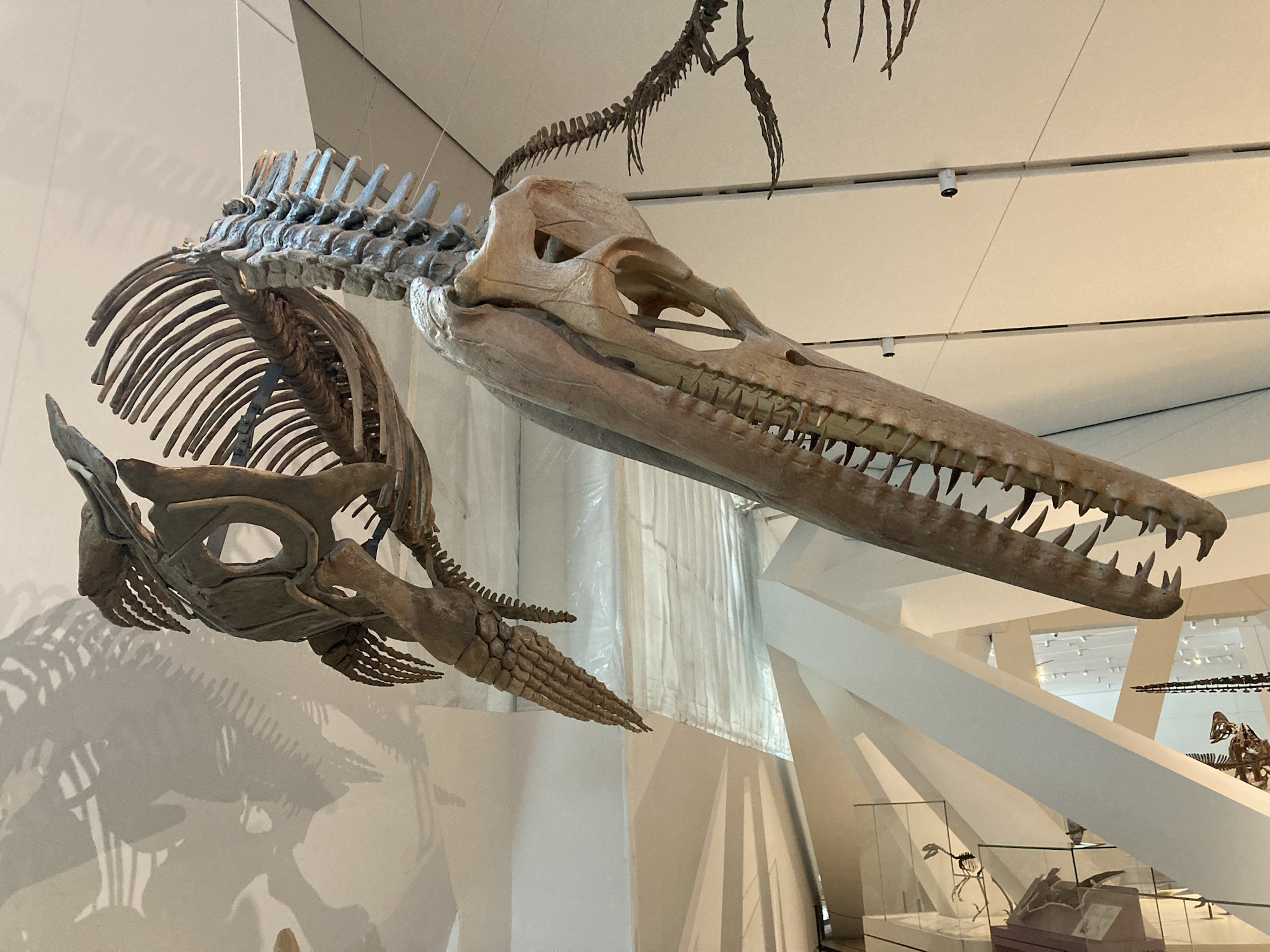
Mounted skeleton of Trinacromerum

Cladogram after Albright, Gillette and Titus (2007).

- Plesiosauria
  - Plesiosaurus
  - Tricleidus
  - Polycotylidae
    - Edgarosaurus
    - - Thililua
      - - Palmulainae
          - UMUT MV 19965 (from Japan)
          - Pahasapasaurus (=AMM 98.1.1)
          - Palmulasaurus
        - Polycotylinae
          - Dolichorhynchops
          - - Trinacromerum
            - - Eopolycotylus
              - Polycotylus

Cladogram after Ketchum and Benson (2010).

- Plesiosauroidea
  - Cryptoclididae
  - Leptocleidia
    - Leptocleididae
    - Polycotylidae
      - Plesiopleurodon
      - - Edgarosaurus
        - - QM F18041
          - - Eopolycotylus
            - - Trinacromerum
              - - Dolichorhynchops herschelensis
                - - Dolichorhynchops
                  - Manemergus
                  - Palmulasaurus

Below is a cladogram of polycotylid relationships from Ketchum & Benson, 2011.

- Plesiosauroidea
  - Cryptoclididae
  - Leptocleidia
    - Leptocleididae
    - Polycotylidae
      - Edgarosaurus
      - - - Plesiopleurodon
          - QM F18041
        - - - Eopolycotylus
            - Polycotylus
            - Thililua
          - - Trinacromerum
            - - Manemergus
              - - Dolichorhynchops herschelensis
                - - Dolichorhynchops
                  - Palmulasaurus
