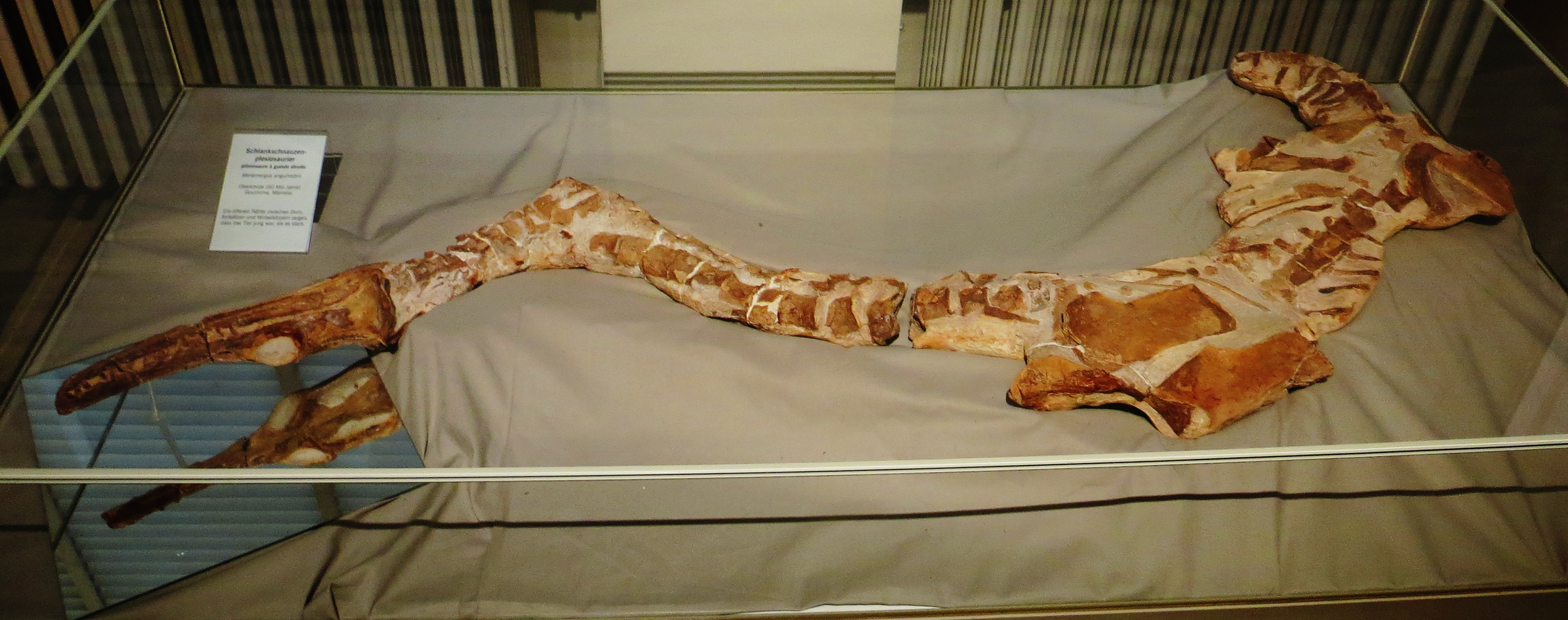
- Skeleton

Scientific classification
- Domain: Eukaryota
- Kingdom: Animalia
- Phylum: Chordata
- Class: Reptilia
- Superorder: †Sauropterygia
- Order: †Plesiosauria
- Family: †Polycotylidae
- Genus: †Manemergus; Buchy et al., 2005

Type species
- Manemergus anguirostris Buchy et al., 2005

= Manemergus =

Manemergus Temporal range: Turonian

Extinct genus of reptiles

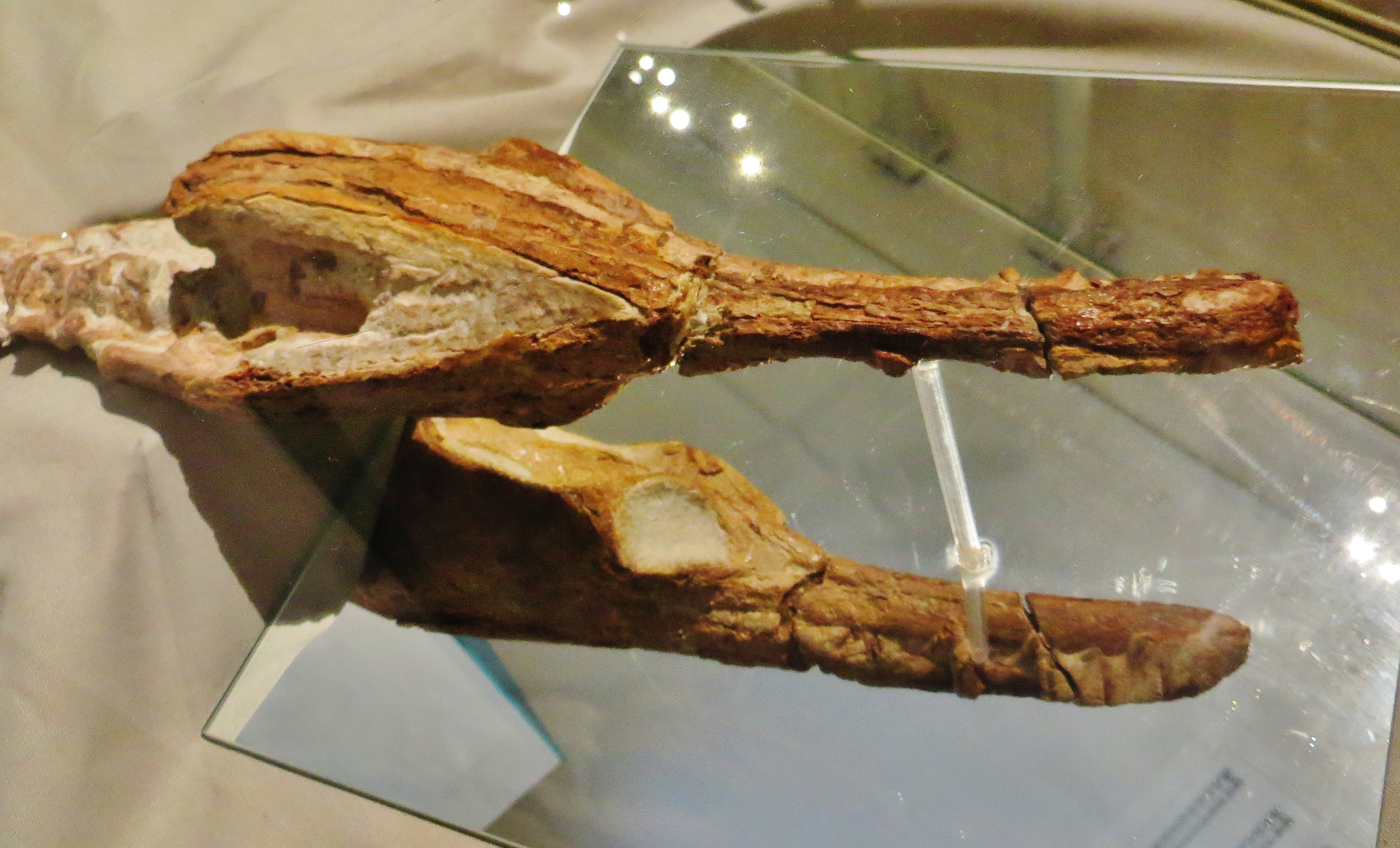
Skull

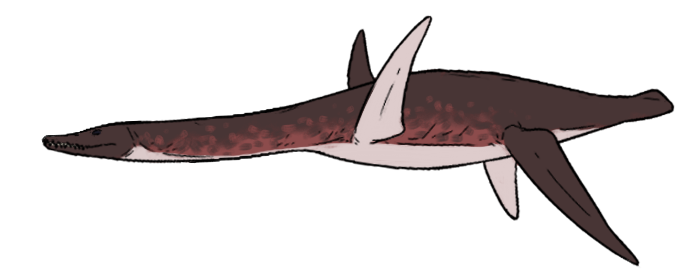
Life restoration

Manemergus is a genus of polycotylid plesiosaur from the Late Cretaceous (Turonian) of Morocco. Manemergus was described in 2005 and contains only one species, M. anguirostris. The type specimen was discovered close to the town of Goulmima (Tizi-n-Imnayen) in Morocco's High Atlas mountains, in the same locality as another polycotylid, Thililua, was discovered.

== See also ==
- List of plesiosaur genera
- Timeline of plesiosaur research
