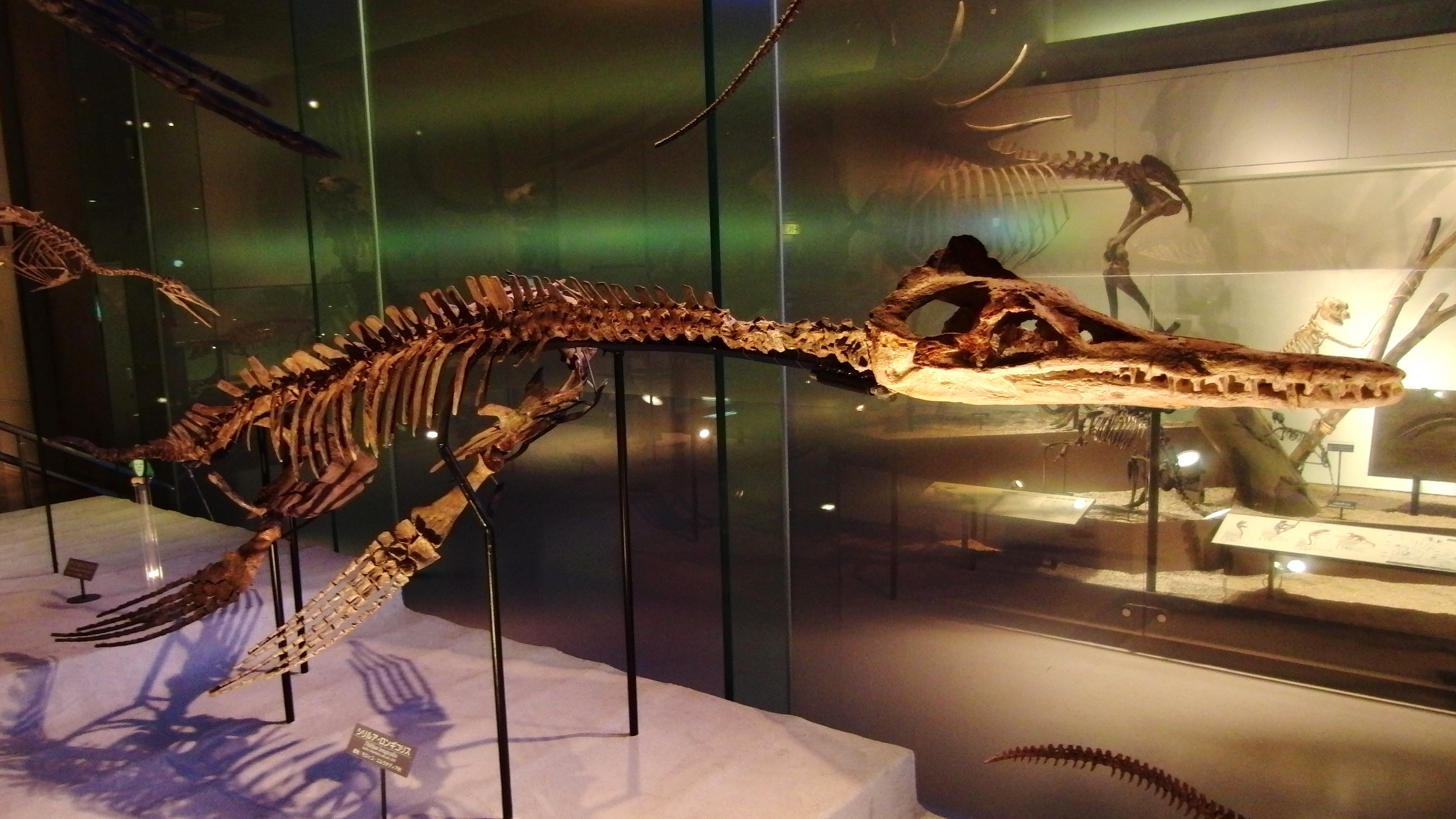
- Fossil in the National Museum of Nature and Science, Tokyo, Japan

Scientific classification
- Kingdom: Animalia
- Phylum: Chordata
- Class: Reptilia
- Superorder: †Sauropterygia
- Order: †Plesiosauria
- Superfamily: †Plesiosauroidea
- Family: †Polycotylidae
- Genus: †Thililua; Bardet, Suberbiola & Jalil, 2003
- Species: †T. longicollis

Binomial name
- †Thililua longicollis Bardet, Suberbiola & Jalil, 2003

= Thililua =

Thililua Temporal range: Late Cretaceous, 93.5–89.3 Ma

Extinct genus of reptiles

Thililua is a genus of polycotylid plesiosaur, containing one species, T. longicollis.

== Discovery ==
The name Thililua is derived from that of an ancient aquatic god from local Berber mythology; longicollis refers to the animal's long neck. Thililua has been found in Late Cretaceous (early Turonian) rocks in the High Atlas mountains of Morocco in north Africa. Thililua is the first Polycotylid plesiosaur discovered in Africa, and also the first discovered that lived at a subtropical latitude. In 2010, Thililua was transferred to Leptocleididae as a sister taxon to Nichollssaura.

== Description ==
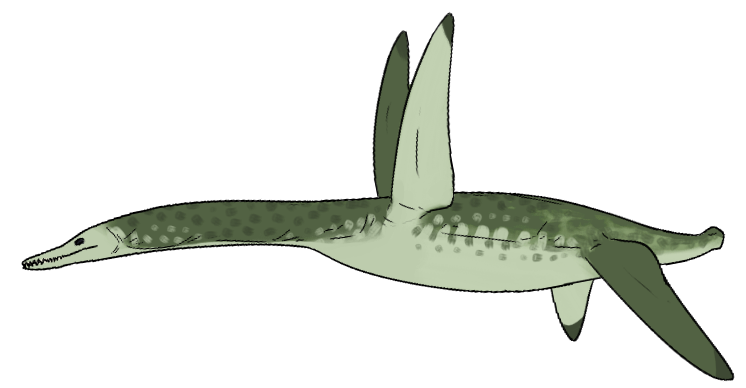
Life restoration

The type specimen of T. longicollis, which was described in 2003, consists of an almost complete skull and lower jaw, articulated with 37 vertebrae. Of these vertebrae, 30 were cervical (neck) vertebrae, which is an unusually high number compared to other Polycotylids, such as Dolichorhynchops, which had only 19 neck vertebrae, and Polycotylus, which had 26. It is believed to be an adult specimen, since some of the cranial sutures are very difficult to distinguish. Using comparisons with the head and neck length to body length ratio of a related genus, Dolichorhynchops, the estimated total length of Thililua was 5.5 to 6 metres.

== See also ==
- List of plesiosaur genera
- Timeline of plesiosaur research
