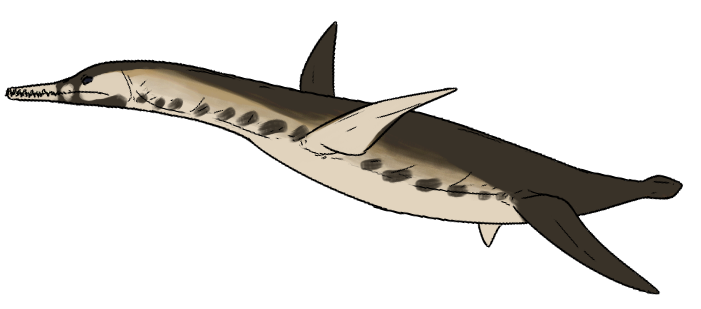
- Life restoration

Scientific classification
- Domain: Eukaryota
- Kingdom: Animalia
- Phylum: Chordata
- Class: Reptilia
- Superorder: †Sauropterygia
- Order: †Plesiosauria
- Family: †Polycotylidae
- Subfamily: †Polycotylinae
- Genus: †Eopolycotylus; Albright, Gillette, and Titus, 2007

Species
- †Eopolycotylus rankini Albright et al., 2007 (type)

= Eopolycotylus =

Eopolycotylus Temporal range: Cenomanian

Extinct genus of reptiles

Eopolycotylus is a genus of polycotylid plesiosaur known from the Cenomanian-age Tropic Shale of Utah.

== See also ==
- Timeline of plesiosaur research
- List of plesiosaurs
