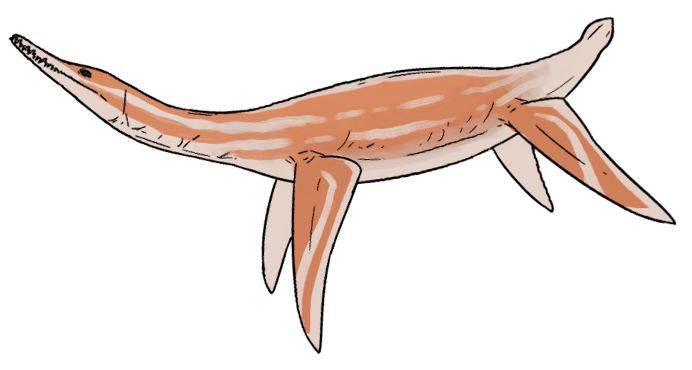
- Life restoration

Scientific classification
- Kingdom: Animalia
- Phylum: Chordata
- Class: Reptilia
- Superorder: †Sauropterygia
- Order: †Plesiosauria
- Family: †Polycotylidae
- Subfamily: †Palmulasaurinae; Albright et al., 2007
- Genus: †Palmulasaurus; Albright et al., 2007

Species
- †P. quadratus Albright et al., 2007 (originally Palmula quadratus) (type)

Synonyms
- Palmula Albright et al., 2007 (preoccupied by Palmula Lea, 1833)

= Palmulasaurus =

Palmulasaurus Temporal range: Turonian ~94–89 Ma

Extinct genus of reptiles

Palmulasaurus is a genus of polycotylid plesiosaur from the Turonian Tropic Shale of Utah. It was originally described as Palmula, but that name was already occupied by a genus of Cretaceous foraminifera first described in 1833.

== See also ==
- List of plesiosaurs
- Timeline of plesiosaur research
