= List of plesiosaur genera =

This list of plesiosaurs is a comprehensive listing of all genera that have ever been included in the order Plesiosauria, excluding purely vernacular terms. The list includes all commonly accepted genera, but also genera that are now considered invalid, doubtful (nomen dubium), or were not formally published (nomen nudum), as well as junior synonyms of more established names, and genera that are no longer considered plesiosaurs. The list currently includes 177 genera.

== Scope and terminology ==
There is no official, canonical list of plesiosaur genera but one of the most thorough attempts can be found on the Plesiosauria section of Mikko Haaramo's Phylogeny Archive; also pertinent is the Plesiosaur Genera section at Adam Stuart Smith's Plesiosaur Directory.

Naming conventions and terminology follow the International Code of Zoological Nomenclature. Technical terms used include:

- Junior synonym: A name which describes the same taxon as a previously published name. If two or more genera are formally designated and the type specimens are later assigned to the same genus, the first to be published (in chronological order) is the senior synonym, and all other instances are junior synonyms. Senior synonyms are generally used, except by special decision of the ICZN, but junior synonyms cannot be used again, even if deprecated. Junior synonymy is often subjective, unless the genera described were both based on the same type specimen.
- Nomen nudum (Latin for "naked name"): A name that has appeared in print but has not yet been formally published by the standards of the ICZN. Nomina nuda (the plural form) are invalid, and are therefore not italicized as a proper generic name would be. If the name is later formally published, that name is no longer a nomen nudum and will be italicized on this list. Often, the formally published name will differ from any nomina nuda that describe the same specimen. In this case, these nomina nuda will be deleted from this list in favor of the published name.
- Preoccupied name: A name that is formally published, but which has already been used for another taxon. This second use is invalid (as are all subsequent uses) and the name must be replaced. As preoccupied names are not valid generic names, they will also go unitalicized on this list.
- Nomen dubium (Latin for "dubious name"): A name describing a fossil with no unique diagnostic features. As this can be an extremely subjective and controversial designation, this term is not used on this list.

== The list ==
Genus	Authors	Year	Status	Age	Location	Notes	Images
Abyssosaurus	Berezin	2011	Valid	Early Cretaceous	Russia	Had a uniquely short, triangular skull with extremely large eye sockets. Shows potential adaptations for specialized deep-diving lifestyle	
Acostasaurus	Gómez-Pérez & Noè	2017	Valid	Early Cretaceous	Colombia	Noted for its unusually caniniform dentition compared to other pliosaurids	
Albertonectes	Kubo et al.	2012	Valid	Late Cretaceous	Canada	Had the longest neck of any known plesiosaur, made up of seventy-six vertebrae	
Alexandronectes	Otero et al.	2016	Valid	Late Cretaceous	New Zealand	The first aristonectine from which a stapes is known	
Alexeyisaurus	Sennikov & Arkhangelsky	2010	Dubious	Late Triassic	Russia	Although originally described as an elasmosaurid plesiosaur, it was suggested to be an undiagnostic sauropterygian taxon by subsequent analyses	
Alzadasaurus	Welles & Bump	1949	Jr. synonym	N/A	N/A	Junior synonym of Styxosaurus	
Anguanax	Cau & Fanti	2015	Valid	Late Jurassic	Italy	Several features of its skull would indicate a diet of soft or small-bodied prey	
Anningasaura	Vincent & Benson	2012	Valid	Early Jurassic	United Kingdom	Known from a partial skeleton belonging to a juvenile animal	
Apatomerus	Williston	1903	Dubious?	Early Cretaceous	United States	Originally identified as a crocodilian and later reinterpreted as a pterosaur, although it may very likely be a plesiosaur	
Aphrosaurus	Welles	1943	Valid	Late Cretaceous	United States	Distinguished by the presence of a deepened ventral notch along the centra of its cervical vertebrae	
Apractocleidus	Smellie	1915	Jr. synonym	N/A	N/A	Junior synonym of Cryptoclidus	
Aptychodon	von Reuss	1855	Valid	Late Cretaceous	Czech Republic	Some studies suggest this genus may be a potential junior synonym of Polyptychodon	
Archaeonectrus	Novozhilov	1964	Valid	Early Jurassic	United Kingdom	Originally mistakenly believed to be a species of Plesiosaurus	
Argentinonectes	Novas et al.	2026	Valid	Late Cretaceous	Argentina	Several shark teeth were found in association with the holotype	
Aristonectes	Cabrera	1941	Valid	Late Cretaceous	Antarctica; Argentina; Chile	This genus would have migrated regularly between Patagonia and Antarctica as implied by its fossil record	
Arminisaurus	Sachs & Kear	2017	Valid	Early Jurassic	Germany	Shares some features of its skeleton with leptocleidian plesiosauroids	
Attenborosaurus	Bakker	1993	Valid	Early Jurassic	United Kingdom	Named in honor of British broadcaster and naturalist David Attenborough	
Atychodracon	Smith	2015	Valid	Late Triassic to Early Jurassic	United Kingdom	Has been assigned to four different genera before its formal description	
Avalonnectes	Benson, Evans & Druckenmiller	2012	Valid	Early Jurassic	United Kingdom	One of the oldest plesiosaurs known to date	
Bathyspondylus	Delair	1982	Valid	Late Jurassic	United Kingdom	Possesses an unusual mix of pliosauroid and plesiosauroid features	
Bishanopliosaurus	Dong	1980	Valid	Early Jurassic to Middle Jurassic	China	Could be distinguished by the bifurcated ribs of its sacrum	
Borealonectes	Sato & Wu	2008	Valid	Middle Jurassic	Canada	One of the few North American plesiosaurs that lived during the Jurassic	
Boyacasaurus	Benavides-Cabra et al.	2025	Valid	Early Cretaceous	Colombia	Known from two specimens found in association with ammonites	
Brachauchenius	Williston	1903	Valid	Late Cretaceous	Morocco; United States	Several pliosaurid specimens of same age had been referred to this genus, although they were either renamed as new taxa or considered dubious	
Brancasaurus	Wegner	1914	Valid	Early Cretaceous	Germany	Its cervical vertebrae are noted for having shark fin-shaped neural spines	
Brimosaurus	Leidy	1854	Dubious	Late Cretaceous	United States	May be synonymous with Cimoliasaurus	
Callawayasaurus	Carpenter	1999	Valid	Early Cretaceous	Colombia	Has no pectoral bars, a trait shared with Terminonatator	
Cardiocorax	Araújo et al.	2015	Valid	Late Cretaceous	Angola	The morphology of its scapula suggests a relatively unique swimming style for this genus	
Ceraunosaurus	Thurmond	1968	Jr. synonym	N/A	N/A	Junior synonym of Trinacromerum	
Chubutinectes	O'Gorman et al.	2023	Valid	Late Cretaceous	Argentina	Larger than the contemporary Kawanectes due to its marine habitat	
Cimoliasaurus	Leidy	1851	Valid	Late Cretaceous	United States	Discovered in sediments that superficially resemble the chalk deposits found in the Western Interior Seaway	
Colymbosaurus	Seeley	1874	Valid	Middle Jurassic to Late Jurassic	Norway; United Kingdom	The holotype humerus was originally misidentified as a femur	
Crymocetus	Cope	1869	Dubious	Late Cretaceous	United Kingdom	Today seen as an indeterminate plesiosaur. Only known from a single vertebra	
Cryonectes	Vincent, Bardet & Mattioli	2012	Valid	Early Jurassic	France	Possessed a relatively elongated snout	
Cryptoclidus	Seeley	1892	Valid	Middle Jurassic to Late Jurassic	United Kingdom	Would have preyed on small, soft-bodied animals as indicated by the delicate build of its skull and teeth	
Discosaurus	Leidy	1851	Valid	Late Cretaceous	United States	Has been argued to be the same taxon as Elasmosaurus	
Djupedalia	Knutsen, Druckenmiller & Hurum	2012	Valid	Late Jurassic	Norway	Named after former Minister of Education and Research Øystein Djupedal	
Dolichorhynchops	Williston	1902	Valid	Late Cretaceous	Canada; United States	Described two years after its discovery	
Dravidosaurus	Yadagiri & Ayyasami	1979	Dubious	Late Cretaceous	India	Suggested to be either an ornithischian (potentially stegosaurian) dinosaur or a plesiosaur	
Eardasaurus	Ketchum & Benson	2022	Valid	Middle Jurassic	United Kingdom	Had prominent enamel ridges in its teeth, which would indicate a diet of large prey	
Edgarosaurus	Druckenmiller	2002	Valid	Early Cretaceous	United States	One of the first polycotylids to become native to the Western Interior Seaway	
Eiectus	Noè & Gómez-Pérez	2021	Valid?	Early Cretaceous	Australia	Potentially synonymous with Kronosaurus	
Elasmosaurus	Cope	1868	Valid	Late Cretaceous	United States	Originally erroneously reconstructed with its skull placed at the end of its tail	
Embaphias	Cope	1894	Dubious	Late Cretaceous	United States	Based on three cervical vertebrae	
Eoplesiosaurus	Benson, Evans & Druckenmiller	2012	Valid	Early Jurassic	United Kingdom	May have been the basalmost known member of the Plesiosauroidea	
Eopolycotylus	Albright et al.	2007	Valid	Late Cretaceous	United States	Known from a single partial skeleton	
Eretmosaurus	Seeley	1874	Valid	Early Jurassic to Middle Jurassic	Russia; United Kingdom	Two species are known	
Eromangasaurus	Kear	2005	Valid	Early Cretaceous	Australia	The holotype skull is almost complete although badly crushed	
Eurycleidus	Andrews	1922	Valid	Early Jurassic	United Kingdom	May have made a powerful forward stroke for fast swimming as suggested by its relatively large shoulder bones	
Eurysaurus	Gaudry	1878	Valid	Early Jurassic	France	Formerly misidentified as a nothosaur	
Fluvionectes	Campbell et al.	2021	Valid	Late Cretaceous	Canada	The holotype specimen may have died in a log jam as suggested by the pieces of coalified wood found alongside it	
Franconiasaurus	Sachs, Eggmaier & Madzia	2024	Valid	Early Jurassic	Germany	Its cervical and dorsal vertebrae possessed short neural spines	
Fresnosaurus	Welles	1943	Valid	Late Cretaceous	United States	Coexisted with at least three other plesiosaurs	
Futabasaurus	Sato, Hasegawa & Manabe	2006	Valid	Late Cretaceous	Japan	Most of its bones preserve bite marks caused by Cretalamna, indicating it would have been scavenged or hunted by the shark	
Gallardosaurus	Gasparini	2009	Valid	Late Jurassic	Cuba	The only known individual was discovered in a concretion in dark shale	
"Georgia"	Otschev	1976	Preoccupied	N/A	N/A	Preoccupied by a genus of snake, later renamed Georgiasaurus	
Georgiasaurus	Otschev	1977	Valid	Late Cretaceous	Russia	The holotype skeleton was damaged during preparation of the quarry stone	
Gondwananectes	Otero et al.	2026	Valid	Middle Jurassic	Chile	May be the sister taxon to the Cryptoclidia	
Goniosaurus	Meyer	1860	Valid	Late Cretaceous	Netherlands	The striations of its tooth meet each other under an angle pointing to the root instead of the apex	
Gronausaurus	Hampe	2013	Jr. synonym	N/A	N/A	Junior synonym of Brancasaurus	
Hastanectes	Benson et al.	2012	Valid	Early Cretaceous	United Kingdom	Originally named as a species of Cimoliasaurus	
Hauffiosaurus	O'Keefe	2001	Valid	Early Jurassic	Germany; United Kingdom	The holotype specimen is preserved lying on its back	
Hydralmosaurus	Welles	1943	Jr. synonym	N/A	N/A	Junior synonym of Styxosaurus	
Hydrorion	Großmann	2007	Valid	Early Jurassic	Germany	Several individuals are known	
Hydrotherosaurus	Welles	1943	Valid	Late Cretaceous	United States	Multiple vertebrae were the first remains to be found. More bones had been unearthed afterwards	
Ischyrodon	von Meyer	1838	Dubious	Middle Jurassic	Switzerland	Has been considered a junior synonym of Liopleurodon, but a 2022 revision found some differences that would make it separate from that genus	
Jucha	Fischer et al.	2020	Valid	Early Cretaceous	Russia	One of the earliest known confirmed elasmosaurids	
Kaiwhekea	Cruickshank & Fordyce	2002	Valid	Late Cretaceous	New Zealand	Preserved inside a large, roughly 6.5 m (21 ft) long concretion	
Kawanectes	O'Gorman	2016	Valid	Late Cretaceous	Argentina	Previously identified as a species of Trinacromerum	
Kimmerosaurus	Brown	1981	Valid	Late Jurassic	Norway? United Kingdom	Its skull was overall similar to that of the related Cryptoclidus but much broader	
Kronosaurus	Longman	1924	Valid	Early Cretaceous	Australia	One of the largest pliosaurids ever identified, likely the apex predator of its environment	
Lagenanectes	Sachs, Hornung & Kear	2017	Valid	Early Cretaceous	Germany	One of the most well-preserved plesiosaurs known from the Early Cretaceous of Europe	
Leivanectes	Páramo-Fonseca et al.	2019	Valid	Early Cretaceous	Colombia	Differs from the contemporary Callawayasaurus, hence its classification as a separate genus	
Leptocleidus	Andrews	1922	Valid	Early Cretaceous	Australia; South Africa; United Kingdom	Like other members of its family and unlike most other plesiosaurs, it inhabited freshwater environments	
Leurospondylus	Brown	1913	Valid	Late Cretaceous	Canada	Its exact taxonomic placement is uncertain	
Libonectes	Carpenter	1997	Valid	Late Cretaceous	Morocco; United States	Originally referred to as a species of Elasmosaurus, but it was named as a distinct genus due to morphological differences	
Lindwurmia	Vincent & Storrs	2019	Valid	Early Jurassic	Germany	Possessed five pairs of premaxillary teeth	
Liopleurodon	Sauvage	1873	Valid	Middle Jurassic to Late Jurassic	France; Germany; Mexico; United Kingdom	Several analyses suggest that this genus may have been an ambush predator	
Lorrainosaurus	Sachs et al.	2023	Valid	Middle Jurassic	France	Originally assigned to Simolestes but it has been found to be more derived	
Luetkesaurus	Kiprijanoff	1883	Dubious	Late Cretaceous	Russia	No species name has ever been assigned	
Luskhan	Fischer et al.	2017	Valid	Early Cretaceous	Russia	Unlike other pliosaurids, it had a slender snout, small teeth, and short tooth rows, convergent with polycotylids	
Lusonectes	Smith, Araújo & Mateus	2012	Valid	Early Jurassic	Portugal	The first plesiosaur named from Portugal	
Macroplata	Swinton	1930	Valid	Early Jurassic	United Kingdom	Its neck is comparatively longer than its head	
Makhaira	Fischer et al.	2015	Valid	Early Cretaceous	Russia	Unusually, its teeth were triangular in cross-section	
Manemergus	Buchy et al.	2005	Valid	Late Cretaceous	Morocco	May have been contemporaneous with Thililua	
Marambionectes	O'Gorman et al.	2024	Valid	Late Cretaceous	Antarctica	Closely allied to the aristonectines	
Maresaurus	Gasparini	1997	Valid	Middle Jurassic	Argentina	The first plesiosaur identified from the Los Molles Formation	
Marmornectes	Ketchum & Benson	2011	Valid	Middle Jurassic	United Kingdom	Would have been very similar to Peloneustes	
Martinectes	Clark, O'Keefe & Slack	2023	Valid	Late Cretaceous	Russia? United States	Initially named as species of Trinacromerum and then assigned to Dolichorhynchops until its reclassification as a new genus in 2023	
Mauisaurus	Hector	1874	Dubious	Late Cretaceous	New Zealand	Several specimens had been referred to this genus, but a 2017 review restricts it only to the lectotype	
Mauriciosaurus	Frey et al.	2017	Valid	Late Cretaceous	Mexico	Similarly to Cryptoclidus, it is noted for the unusual arrangement of gastralia	
Megacephalosaurus	Schumacher et al.	2013	Valid	Late Cretaceous	United States	One of the last known pliosaurids prior to their extinction	
Megalneusaurus	Knight	1898	Valid	Late Jurassic	United States	One specimen preserves stomach contents, including cephalopods and fish	
Meyerasaurus	Smith & Vincent	2010	Valid	Early Jurassic	Germany	Represented by a complete, articulated skeleton	
Microcleidus	Watson	1909	Valid	Early Jurassic	France; Germany; Luxembourg; United Kingdom	Possessed at least forty vertebrae in its neck	
Monquirasaurus	Noè & Gómez-Pérez	2021	Valid	Early Cretaceous	Colombia	Originally known as a South American species of Kronosaurus. Very large for a pliosaurid	
Morenosaurus	Welles	1943	Valid	Late Cretaceous	United States	The only described specimen is nearly complete, missing only the skull and some parts of the neck and paddles	
Morturneria	Chatterjee & Creisler	1994	Valid	Late Cretaceous	Antarctica	Once considered to be a juvenile Aristonectes, but a 2017 study found it to be distinct enough to warrant recognition as separate	
Muraenosaurus	Seeley	1874	Valid	Middle Jurassic	United Kingdom	May have possessed an increased muscle attachment towards its neck as indicated by its elongated cervical vertebrae with broad neural spines	
Nakonanectes	Serratos et al.	2017	Valid	Late Cretaceous	United States	Its overall morphology was exceptionally similar to that of aristonectines despite being less derived	
Nichollssaura	Druckenmiller & Russell	2009	Valid	Early Cretaceous	Canada	Fills a temporal gap of approximately 40 million years in the fossil record of North American plesiosaurs	
"Nichollsia"	Druckenmiller & Russell	2008	Preoccupied	N/A	N/A	Preoccupied by a genus of isopod, renamed Nichollssaura	
Occitanosaurus	Bardet et al.	1999	Jr. synonym	N/A	N/A	Junior synonym of Microcleidus	
Ogmodirus	Williston & Moodie	1913	Dubious	Late Cretaceous	United States	May be an elasmosaurid	
Oligosimus	Leidy	1872	Jr. synonym	N/A	N/A	Junior synonym of Cimoliasaurus	
Opallionectes	Kear	2006	Valid	Early Cretaceous	Australia	Hypothesized to live on a cold habitat	
Ophthalmothule	Roberts et al.	2020	Valid	Late Jurassic to Early Cretaceous	Norway	May have possibly hunted at night and/or in the bathypelagic zone as suggested by its relatively large eye sockets and features similar to those of Abyssosaurus	
Orophosaurus	Cope	1851	Dubious	Late Cretaceous	United States	Named based only on portions of three neck vertebrae	
Pachycostasaurus	Cruickshank et al.	1996	Valid	Middle Jurassic	United Kingdom	Its skeleton bears several unique features in most of the bones	
Pahasapasaurus	Schumacher	2007	Valid	Late Cretaceous	United States	Distinguishable by characters of its epipodial and palate bones	
"Palmula"	Albright et al.	2007	Preoccupied	N/A	N/A	Preoccupied by a genus of foraminifer, renamed Palmulasaurus	
Palmulasaurus	Albright et al.	2007	Valid	Late Cretaceous	United States	Shared its environment with three other polycotylids	
Pantosaurus	Marsh	1893	Valid	Late Jurassic	United States	One fossil preserves a partially digested ichthyosaur embryo within its stomach cavity	
Peloneustes	Lydekker	1889	Valid	Middle Jurassic	United Kingdom	Multiple specimens are known, including fairly complete material, which make it one of the most well-known pliosaurids	
Peyerus	Stromer	1935	Jr. synonym	N/A	N/A	Junior synonym of Leptocleidus	
Picrocleidus	Andrews	1910	Valid	Middle Jurassic	United Kingdom	Previously synonymized with the coeval Muraenosaurus, but this has been cast into doubt	
Piptomerus	Cope	1887	Jr. synonym	N/A	N/A	Junior synonym of Cimoliasaurus	
Piratosaurus	Leidy	1865	Dubious	Late Cretaceous	Canada	Solely known from a single tooth which may have come from a polycotylid	
Plesioelasmosaurus	Schumacher & Everhart	2022	Valid	Late Cretaceous	United States	Would have been relatively basal for an elasmosaurid	
Plesionectes	Sachs & Madzia	2025	Valid	Early Jurassic	Germany	Preserved patches of soft tissue impressions that may indicate a dark coloration for this taxon	
Plesiopharos	Puértolas-Pascual et al.	2021	Valid	Early Jurassic	Portugal	The holotype was discovered next to a lighthouse	
Plesiopleurodon	Carpenter	1996	Valid	Late Cretaceous	United States	Initially believed to be a member of the Pliosauroidea	
Plesiopterys	O'Keefe	2004	Valid	Early Jurassic	Germany	Displays an unusual combination of primitive and derived traits	
Plesiosaurus	De la Beche & Conybeare	1821	Valid	Early Jurassic	United Kingdom	The first plesiosaur genus scientifically named and described. May be the most commonly found member in the Lias Group	
Pliosaurus	Owen	1841	Valid	Late Jurassic to Early Cretaceous	Norway; Russia; Ukraine; United Kingdom	One of the largest known pliosaurids. The second specimen of P. funkei has been nicknamed "Predator X"	
Polycotylus	Cope	1869	Valid	Late Cretaceous	Russia; United States	One particular specimen preserves a fetus inside of it, suggesting it gave live birth	
Polyptychodon	Owen	1841	Dubious	Late Cretaceous	Argentina? France? United Kingdom	The sauropod dinosaur Dinodocus had been mistakenly attributed to this genus	
"Raptocleidus"	Evans	2012	Nomen nudum	Early Jurassic	United Kingdom	Two species have been named, albeit informally	
Rhaeticosaurus	Wintrich et al.	2017	Valid	Late Triassic	Germany	One of the few plesiosaurs known from the Triassic	
Rhomaleosaurus	Seeley	1874	Valid	Early Jurassic	United Kingdom	One of the largest early predatory marine reptiles. Four species are known	
Sachicasaurus	Páramo-Fonseca et al.	2018	Valid	Early Cretaceous	Colombia	One of the largest and most completely known pliosaurids yet described	
Scalamagnus	Clark, O'Keefe & Slack	2023	Valid	Late Cretaceous	United States	Once believed to be a species of Dolichorhynchops	
Scanisaurus	Persson	1959	Dubious	Late Cretaceous	Russia; Sweden	Although it is now considered dubious, this genus continues to be used in practice	
Seeleyosaurus	White	1940	Valid	Early Jurassic	Germany; Russia?	Remains originally identified as Plesiosaurus	
Serpentisuchops	Persons, Street & Kelley	2022	Valid	Late Cretaceous	United States	Had an exceptionally long neck, a unique trait among polycotylids	
Simolestes	Andrews	1909	Valid	Middle Jurassic to Late Jurassic	India? United Kingdom	Possessed an unusually short, high skull	
Sinopliosaurus	Young	1944	Dubious	Early Cretaceous	China	Based only on a tooth and three vertebrae	
Spitrasaurus	Knutsen, Druckenmiller & Hurum	2012	Valid	Late Jurassic	Norway; United Kingdom?	Two species have been named	
Spondylosaurus	Fischer	1845	Jr. synonym	N/A	N/A	Junior synonym of Pliosaurus	
Stenorhynchosaurus	Páramo-Fonseca et al.	2016	Valid	Early Cretaceous	Colombia	Originally identified as a specimen of Brachauchenius	
"Stereosaurus"	Seeley	1869	Nomen nudum	Late Cretaceous	United Kingdom	An informally named plesiosaur	
Sthenarosaurus	Watson	1909	Valid	Early Jurassic	United Kingdom	Its pelvis was relatively broad and strong	
Stratesaurus	Benson, Evans & Druckenmiller	2012	Valid	Early Jurassic	United Kingdom	Possibly the basalmost known rhomaleosaurid	
Stretosaurus	Tarlo	1959	Jr. synonym	N/A	N/A	Junior synonym of Pliosaurus	
Strongylokrotaphus	Novozhilov	1964	Jr. synonym	N/A	N/A	Junior synonym of Pliosaurus	
Styxosaurus	Welles	1943	Valid	Late Cretaceous	United States	Closely related to Elasmosaurus, but can be differentiated from it based on morphological features	
Sulcusuchus	Gasparini & Spalletti	1990	Valid	Late Cretaceous	Argentina	Originally mistakenly believed to be a pseudosuchian	
Taphrosaurus	Cope	1870	Dubious	Late Cretaceous	United States	Poorly known	
Tatenectes	O'Keefe & Wahl	2003	Valid	Late Jurassic	United States	Its unusual body shape and pachyostotic gastralia would have made it more suitable to turbulence	
Terminonatator	Sato	2003	Valid	Late Cretaceous	Canada	One of the youngest plesiosaurs known from the Western Interior Seaway	
Thalassiodracon	Storrs & Taylor	1996	Valid	Late Triassic to Early Jurassic	United Kingdom	Its maxillae had heterodont dentition	
Thalassiosaurus	Welles	1953	Jr. synonym	N/A	N/A	Junior synonym of Styxosaurus	
Thalassomedon	Welles	1943	Valid	Late Cretaceous	United States	The type specimen has stones preserved in its stomach cavity	
Thalassonomosaurus	Welles	1943	Jr. synonym	N/A	N/A	Junior synonym of Styxosaurus	
Thaumatodracon	Smith & Araújo	2017	Valid	Early Jurassic	United Kingdom	Relatively large for a rhomaleosaurid	
Thaumatosaurus	von Meyer	1841	Jr. synonym	N/A	N/A	The holotype is dubious and not diagnostic, as it can be referred to as an indeterminate pliosauroid. The specimens that were assigned to this genus now belong to different taxa	
Thililua	Bardet, Suberbiola & Jalil	2003	Valid	Late Cretaceous	Morocco	The first polycotylid plesiosaur named from Africa	
Traskasaura	O'Keefe et al.	2025	Valid	Late Cretaceous	Canada	Before its formal scientific description, it has been variously referred to as the "Courtenay elasmosaur", "Puntledge elasmosaur", or "Haslam elasmosaur". Officially recognized as the Provincial Fossil of British Columbia	
Tremamesacleis	White	1940	Jr. synonym	N/A	N/A	Junior synonym of Muraenosaurus	
Trematospondylus	Quenstedt	1858	Dubious	Middle Jurassic	Germany	One of the first described plesiosaurs. Known only from seven large vertebrae	
Tricleidus	Andrews	1909	Valid	Middle Jurassic	United Kingdom	One referred species has been later found to belong to Colymbosaurus	
Trinacromerum	Cragin	1888	Valid	Late Cretaceous	Canada; United States	May have preyed on small fish as suggested by its dentition	
Tuarangisaurus	Wiffen, Wiffen & Moisley	1986	Valid	Late Cretaceous	New Zealand	Possesses two features in its skeleton that are otherwise unknown in other elasmosaurids	
"Turneria"	Chatterjee & Small	1989	Preoccupied	N/A	N/A	Preoccupied by a genus of ant, renamed Morturneria	
Umoonasaurus	Kear, Schroeder & Lee	2006	Valid	Early Cretaceous	Australia	Uniquely for a plesiosaur, its skull features three crest-ridges that were likely covered in keratin	
Unktaheela	Clark, O'Keefe & Slack	2023	Valid	Late Cretaceous	United States	The smallest adult polycotylid yet known	
Uronautes	Cope	1876	Dubious	Late Cretaceous	United States	Described as a rhomaleosaurid but its extremely late age casts doubt into this	
Vectocleidus	Benson et al.	2012	Valid	Early Cretaceous	United Kingdom	Previously thought to belong to its relative Leptocleidus	
Vegasaurus	O'Gorman et al.	2015	Valid	Late Cretaceous	Antarctica	May be closely related to Morenosaurus	
Vinialesaurus	Gasparini et al.	2002	Valid	Late Jurassic	Cuba	Originally referred to as a species of Cryptoclidus, but it was distinct enough from that genus to be named as its own taxon	
Wapuskanectes	Druckenmiller & Russell	2006	Valid	Early Cretaceous	Canada	The oldest known elasmosaurid from North America	
Westphaliasaurus	Schwermann & Sander	2011	Valid	Early Jurassic	Germany	Known from an articulated, almost complete skeleton	
Woolungasaurus	Persson	1960	Dubious	Early Cretaceous	Australia	Today considered an indeterminate elasmosaurid	
Wunyelfia	Otero et al.	2021	Valid	Late Cretaceous	Chile	One of the few Patagonian plesiosaurs described from outside Argentina	
Yuzhoupliosaurus	Zhang	1985	Valid	Middle Jurassic	China	Distinguishable by its long coracoids and well-developed clavicles	
Zarafasaura	Vincent et al.	2011	Valid	Late Cretaceous	Morocco	Unlike other elasmosaurids, its skull was unusually short	

== See also ==
- Sauropterygia
  - Plesiosaur
- List of dinosaurs
- List of ichthyosaurs
- List of mosasaurs
- List of pterosaurs
