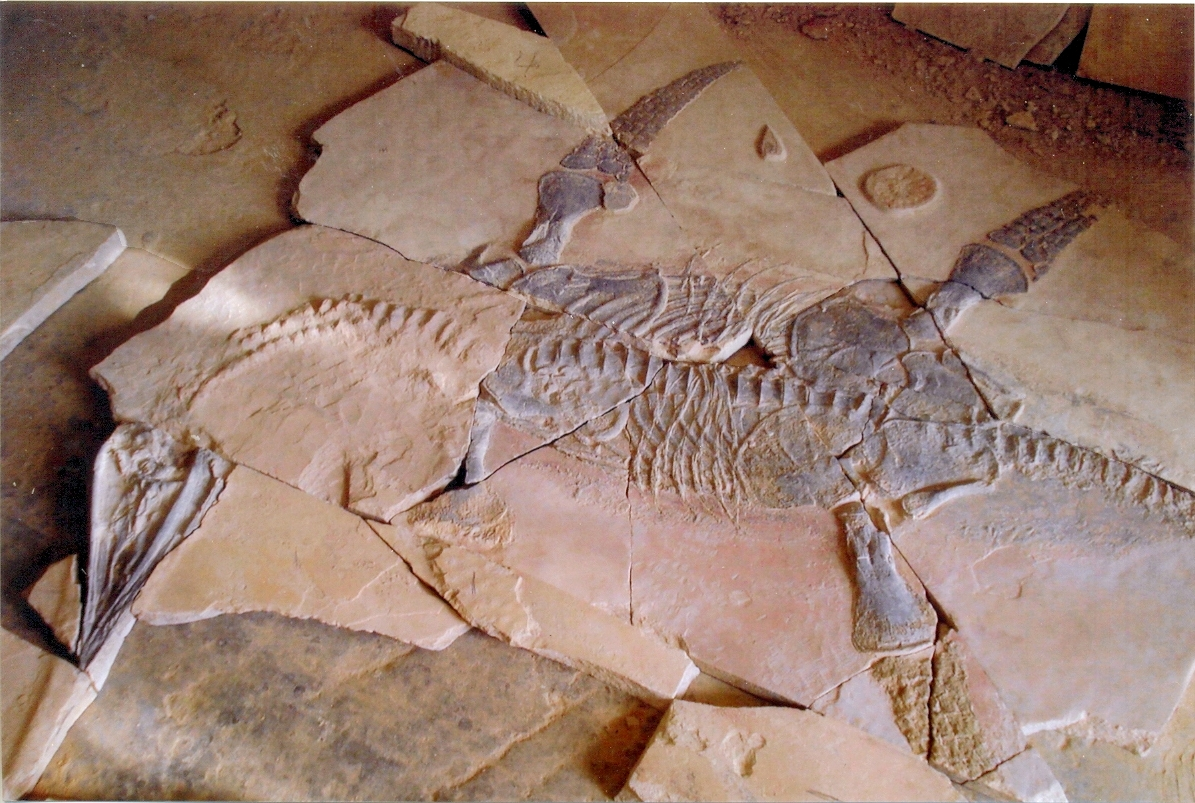
- Holotype fossil of Mauriciosaurus fernandezi

Scientific classification
- Kingdom: Animalia
- Phylum: Chordata
- Class: Reptilia
- Superorder: †Sauropterygia
- Order: †Plesiosauria
- Superfamily: †Plesiosauroidea
- Family: †Polycotylidae
- Genus: †Mauriciosaurus; Frey et al., 2017

Type species
- Mauriciosaurus fernandezi Frey et al., 2017

= Mauriciosaurus =

Mauriciosaurus Temporal range: Early Turonian ~93.9–92 Ma

Extinct genus of reptiles

Mauriciosaurus (meaning "Mauricio [Fernández Garza's] reptile") is a genus of polycotylid plesiosaur from the Late Cretaceous of Mexico. It contains a single species, M. fernandezi (also named after Fernández Garza), described in 2017 by Eberhard Frey and colleagues from a single well-preserved juvenile specimen about 2 metres (6 ft 7 in) long. Morphologically, it is overall most similar to the polycotyline polycotylids Trinacromerum and Dolichorhynchops. However, several features separate Mauriciosaurus from all other polycotylids, warranting the naming of a new genus. These include the sophisticated pattern of ridges on the bottom of the parasphenoid bone on its palate; the narrow openings in the palate bordered by the pterygoid bones; the lack of perforations in the surface of the coracoid; and the highly unusual arrangement of gastralia, or belly ribs, which is only otherwise seen in the non-polycotylid Cryptoclidus.

Partially as a consequence of the oxygen-poor environment that the specimen was preserved in, the type specimen Mauriciosaurus is notable for possessing well-preserved soft-tissues. In life, each of its four flippers bore a flexible trailing edge such that they formed hydrofoils, and contour fat created a drop-like outline of the body by merging the torso and immobile tail into a single unit. Both of these soft-tissue traits would have improved the animal's hydrodynamic performance, making it a fast swimmer comparable to modern leatherback sea turtles. Additionally, a heavily-pigmented lining protected the organs of the body cavity from UV exposure. After death, the sediment allowed the contour fat to preserve into adipocere instead of putrefying, which preserved most of the epidermal soft tissue save for that of the belly.

The oxygen-poor deposits that Mauriciosaurus was preserved in, collectively known as the Vallecillo plattenkalk, would have represented the bottom of a continental shelf about 500 kilometres (310 mi) offshore in the prehistoric Gulf of Mexico. Inoceramid bivalves represent the only endemic benthic fauna at the site; other fossil organisms known from Vallecillo include invertebrates such as ammonites and barnacles that grew on those ammonites, as well as vertebrates consisting of various fish, aigialosaurid mosasaurs, and turtles. The type specimen of Mauriciosaurus is associated with an ammonite, Mammites nodosoides, which is present only in the Turonian interval of the Vallecillo deposits, allowing it to be dated to that age.

== Discovery and naming ==
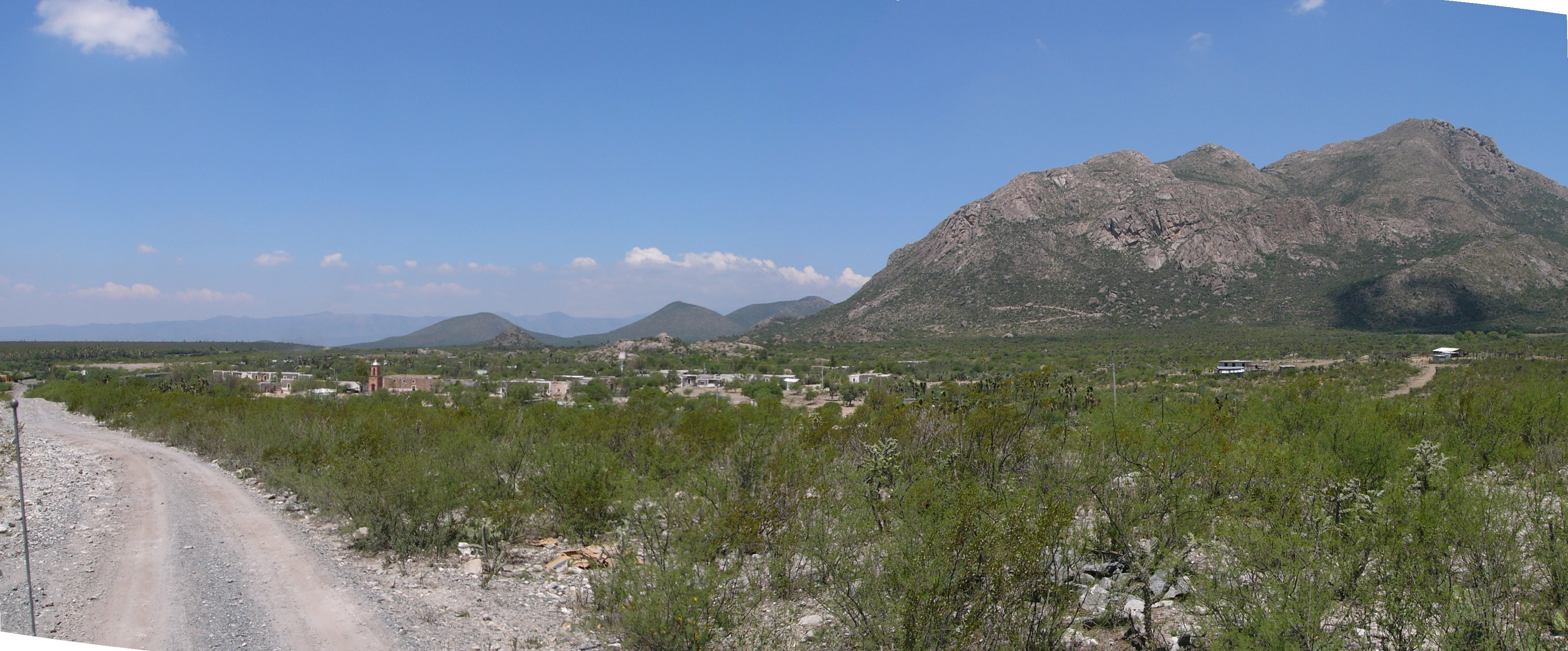
Geography of the state of Nuevo León, in which Mauriciosaurus remains have been found

The type and only known specimen of Mauriciosaurus was found in the summer of 2011 by workers at a laminated limestone quarry near the town of Vallecillo, in the state of Nuevo León, Mexico. It is labelled under the collection number INAH CPC RFG 2544 P.F.1 (INAH standing for the Instituto Nacional de Antropología e Historia, or National Institute of Anthropology and History) at the Museo del Desierto in Saltillo, Coahuila, Mexico; currently, however, it is on display currently at the Museo Papalote Verde in Monterrey, the capital of Nuevo León. The specimen has been broken into 28 slabs, which collectively preserve a nearly-complete and articulated skeleton, missing only the left coracoid, parts of the flippers, and the tip of the tail (which were lost during collection by the workers).

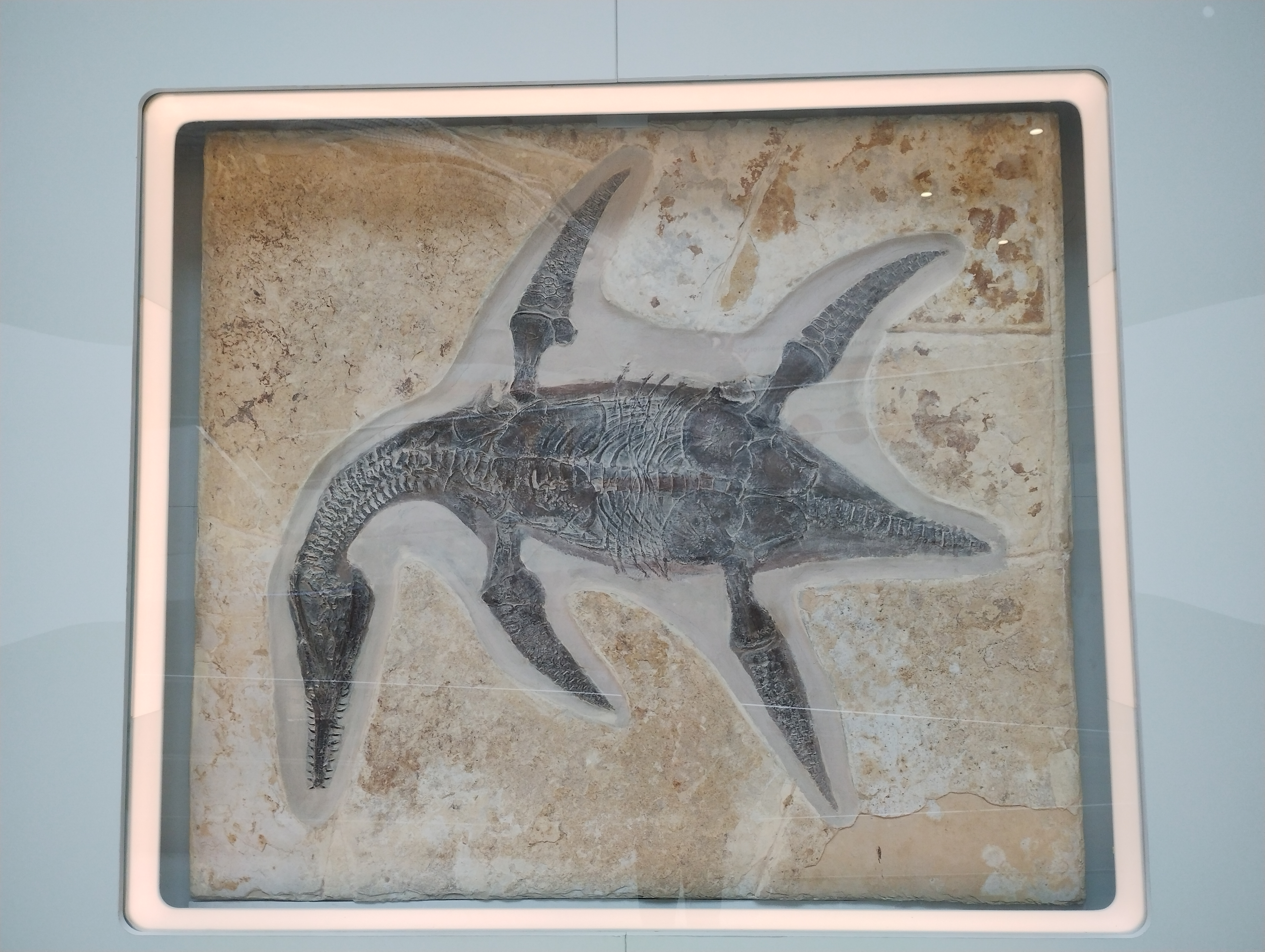
Replica of the holotype

INAH CPC RFG 2544 P.F.1 was found in a 7.7 metres (25 ft) section of laminated limestone mixed with marl, part of the plattenkalk Konservat-Lagerstätte (fine limestone deposits that exquisitely preserve animals) within the Cenomanian-Turonian Agua Nueva Formation. The plattenkalk is quite widespread, being largely concentrated around Vallecillo but spanning an area of 10,000 square kilometres (3,900 sq mi). Outside of these deposits, macroscopic fossils are relatively rare in the Agua Nueva. Detailed biostratigraphic zonation has been conducted for the Vallecillo plattenkalk; the presence of the vascoceratid ammonite Mammites nodosoides allows the slab containing Mauriciosaurus to be dated to the early Turonian portion of the plattenkalk.

Eberhard Frey, Eric Mulder, Wolfgang Stinnesbeck, Héctor Rivera Sylva, José Padilla Gutiérrez, and Arturo González González described the specimen in 2017, formally naming it as a new taxon in a paper submitted to the Boletín de la Sociedad Geológica Mexicana (Bulletin of the Geological Society of Mexico). The genus and species name, Mauriciosaurus fernandezi, is in honour of Mauricio Fernández Garza, who has provided the specimen for scientific study, in addition to providing funding for both research at Vallecillo and public science education in Nuevo León.

== Description ==
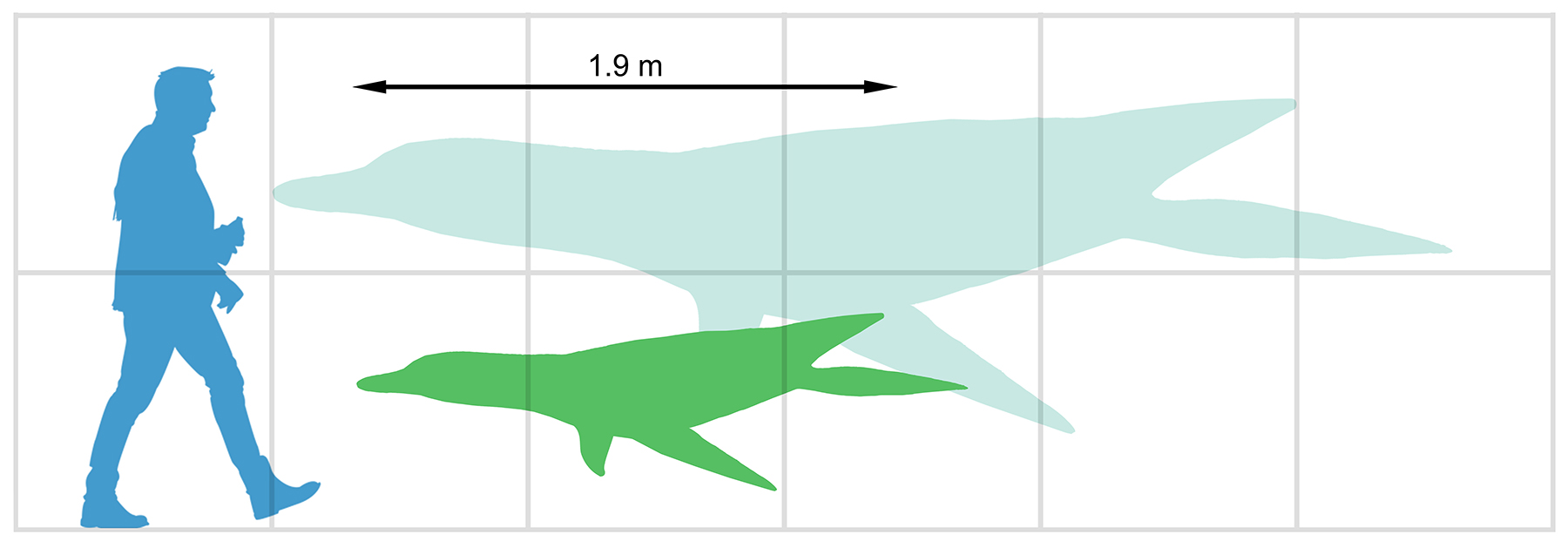
Size of juvenile Mauriciosaurus fernandezi and estimated adult size

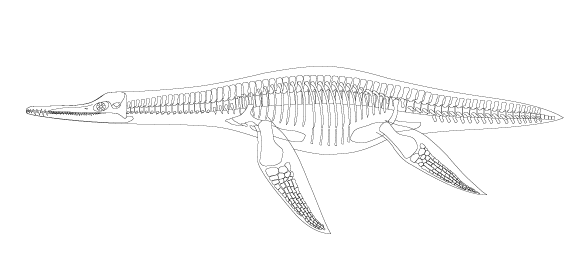
Reconstruction of the skeleton in side-on view

Mauriciosaurus is a short-necked plesiosaur, bearing a drop-shaped body with a small tail. The type specimen of Mauriciosaurus would have measured 1.9–2.1 metres (6 ft 3 in – 6 ft 11 in) long in total, 1.5 metres (4 ft 11 in) wide at the flippers and weighed 79 kilograms (174 lb). However, this specimen is immature, judging by the lack of fusion in the cervical vertebrae; the coracoids bearing no forward projections that interlock with the clavicles; the thin bones of the shoulder and hip girdles; the lack of a ridge on the top surface of the scapula; the short ischia; and the presence of gaps (filled by extensive cartilage in life) between the long bones of the flippers. The palate is mineralized, suggesting that the specimen was still at least a subadult. Adult individuals would have grown up to twice the length of the type specimen.

=== Skull ===
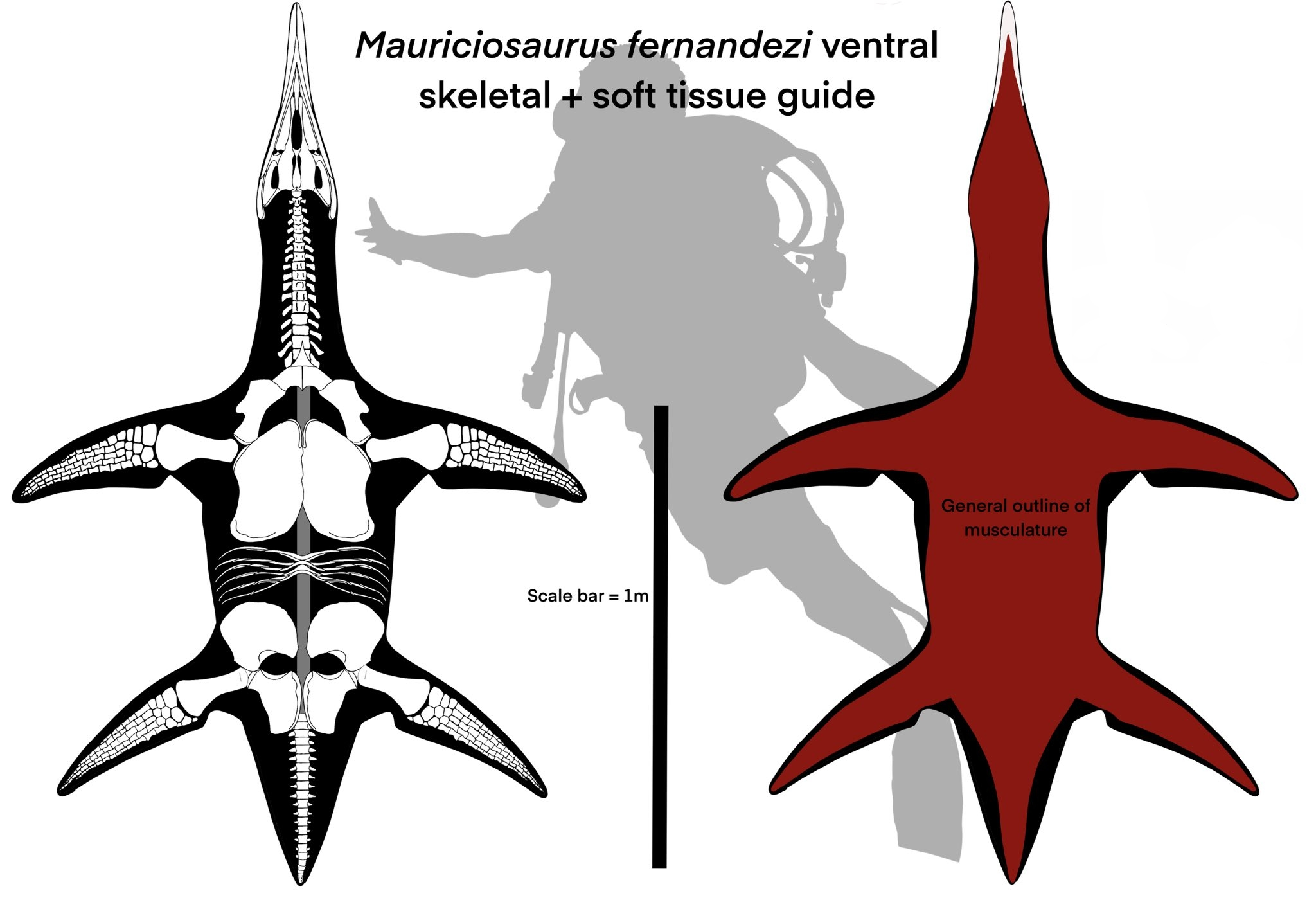
Skeletal diagram viewed from below and soft tissue reconstruction

The snout of Mauriciosaurus is round in cross-section and straight-sided. The bottom of the jaw is even, unlike Thililua where the jaw projects downwards at the level of the eye sockets. Each side of the upper jaw of Mauriciosaurus contain at least 42 teeth, including 4 in the premaxilla and 32 in the maxilla. All of the teeth are of the same shape, being four times taller than they are wide with conical and recurved tips; the smallest tooth, from the back of the mouth, is about a quarter the size of the largest. The gaps separating the teeth are a slightly wider than the teeth themselves. While it is hard to infer much about the precise arrangement of the teeth in life, the teeth of the upper and lower jaws probably would have been interlocking. Compared to other polycotylids, the teeth are smaller than those of Eopolycotylus, Pahasapasaurus, and Georgiasaurus, and more numerous than those of Trinacromerum (30-38) or Dolichorhynchops (26-30).

Most of the diagnostic characteristics in the skull of Mauriciosaurus are found on the palate. Like other polycotylids, the pterygoid bone of Mauriciosaurus bears a dish-like depression. Unlike both Trinacromerum and Dolichorhynchops, however, the depression does not span the entire bottom surface of the bone, and is instead restricted to the front portion. The back of the bottom surface of the pterygoid bears prominent ridges arranged uniquely in a W-shape; Polycotylus has a similar, albeit less complex, arrangement of ridges. Like Trinacromerum but unlike Dolichorhynchops, the tips of the processes extending out from the front of the pterygoids are significantly widened; it is three times as wide as the rest of the process in Mauriciosaurus, and twice as wide in Trinacromerum. Similarly, Mauriciosaurus and Trinacromerum both bear projections on the rear quarter of the pterygoid (a rounded tubercle in Mauriciosaurus, and a sharp ridge in Trinacromerum), whereas Dolichorhynchops lacks any such projection.

An additional trait shared between Mauriciosaurus and Trinacromerum involves the parasphenoid, which separates the pterygoid from the midline of the skull; the front of the parasphenoid is bifurcated in both, while it tapers to a single blunt point in Dolichorhynchops. The pterygoid and parasphenoid enclose three holes in the palate, the anterior and two posterior interpterygoid vacuities. The anterior interpterygoid vacuity is the largest of the holes in the palate, extending roughly from the 23rd to the 32nd tooth positions in the maxilla. Like other polyoctylids, the posterior interpterygoid vacuities are closed by the pterygoid. However, they are unusually narrow and oval-shaped in Mauriciosaurus, whereas they are wider and more rounded in Trinacromerum due to the concave inner margins of the pterygoid and parasphenoid. Meanwhile, on the lower jaw, the splenial contributes about 50% to the bottom surface of the jaw, which is more than Palmulasaurus and Eopolycotylus.

=== Vertebral column ===
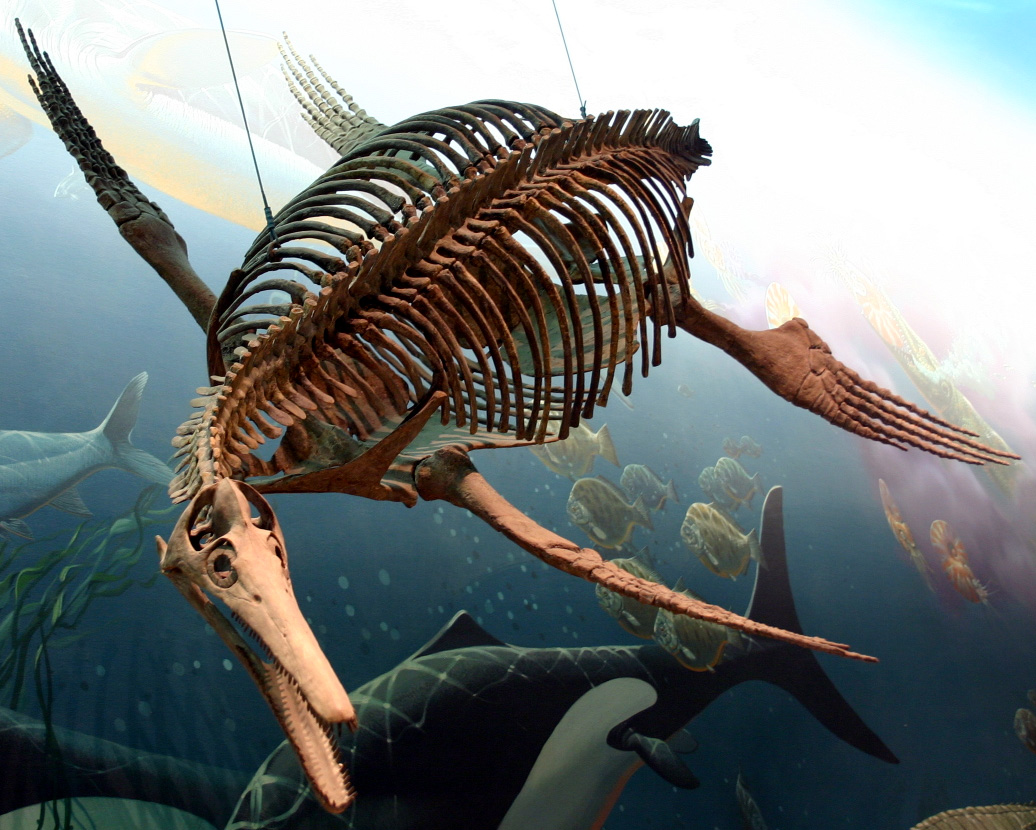
Skeletal reconstruction of related species Dolichorhynchops osborni

Mauriciosaurus bore 21 cervical vertebrae, at least 23 thoracic vertebrae, and at least 25 in the sacrum and tail (the delineation between these two types is not clear, since it is obscured by the ischium). The centra of Mauriciosaurus are constricted on their outer surfaces, unlike the cylindrical centra of Trinacromerum. Both the cervical and thoracic centra have length-width ratios of about 2:3; the cervical centra are procoelous (concave in front and convex behind), whereas the thoracic centra are platycoelous (both surfaces are flat). The sacral and caudal centra are generally shorter, with length-width ratios of about 1:3, but they also become narrower such that the last several preserved caudal centra are twice as long as they are wide; the first caudal centrum appears to be opisthocoelous (convex in front and concave behind), while the rest are platycoelous (flat on both sides). Each caudal centra only articulated with one haemal arch at its back end, as opposed to one at each end in Dolichorhynchops.

Like other members of the Sauropterygia, the cervical vertebrae in the front half of the neck bore two pits on their bottom surfaces, separated by a median ridge; this ridge is abruptly replaced by a depression in the twelfth to eighteenth vertebrae, following which the ridge is present again. The same pits are present on the thoracic vertebrae, where they are separated by not one but two distinct ridges. An additional pit is present immediately beside each of the blunt keels that border the sides of the bottom face. The neural spines of the cervical vertebrae become taller and more inclined, with the seventeenth neural spine being as tall as the centrum and being inclined at an angle of 15°. Out of the thoracic ribs, the ninth is the longest, with rib size gradually decreasing on either side. All of the thoracic ribs bear only one articular facet; the third rib unusually has a facet that is strongly triangular in cross-section, which is probably an artifact of preservation.

A particularly unusual feature of Mauriciosaurus is its gastralia. There are six gastralia, each made up of a central V-shaped medial ossicle and various lateral ossicles attached to its sides. The second and third gastralia share a single medial ossicle, as do the fifth and sixth. The fourth medial ossicle is unusually massive, being about twice the thickness of the other medial ossicles. All of the gastralia converge to a single central point, which is a feature that is unprecedented among polycotylids, being only otherwise seen in Cryptoclidus. It is unlikely that this unusual arrangement is the product of taphonomic processes, since all of the gastralia seem to be preserved in alignment; the arrangement of the gastralia does not appear to be influenced by age either.

=== Limbs ===
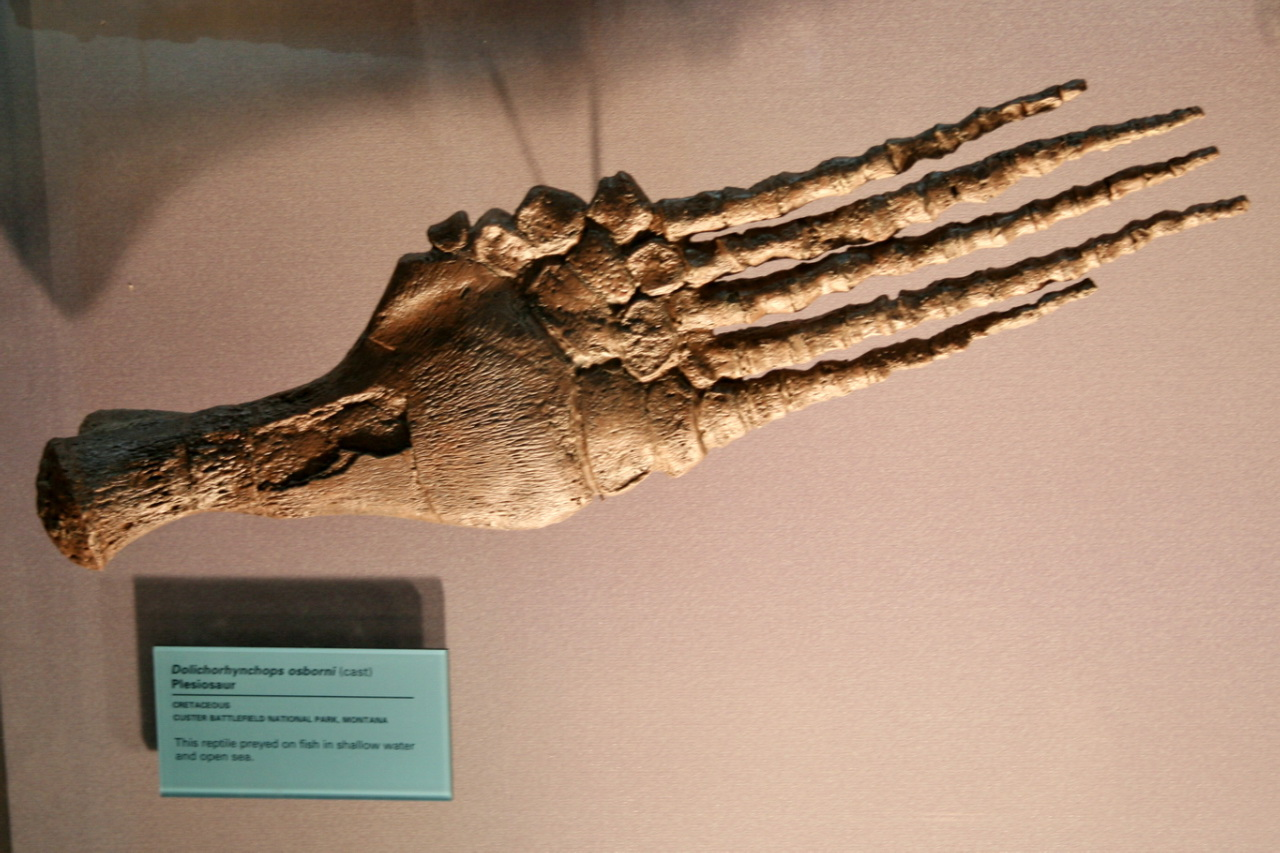
Paddle of related species Dolichorhynchops osborni

In addition to the aforementioned forward projections, the trapezoidal coracoid of Mauriciosaurus differs from those of Dolichorhynchops and Trinacromerum in that it lacks perforations along its midline and at its back margin. While this may possibly be influenced by the specimen's young age, it is unusual that they are entirely absent at this stage of development. Additionally, unlike Eopolycotylus, the surface of the coracoid in Mauriciosaurus is largely smooth and devoid of pits (foramina). The front and back of the scapula are convex while the other edges are concave; the dorsal scapular process projects upwards from the outer edge. At the front of the scapula is a small ridge that probably would have supported an extension made of cartilage. Within the pelvis, the pubis is the largest bone, being a third larger than the ischium and six times larger than the ilium, which is not curved unlike Eopolycotylus. The rounded shape of the pubis can be attributed to the specimen's immaturity.

One of the traits that allies Mauriciosaurus with other polycotyline polycotylids is its slightly S-shaped humerus, which is approximately 1.6 times as long as it is wide. Like other polycotylids, the humerus is also shorter than the femur, but has a wider bottom end. The humerus does not have a bulge situated behind the humeral head, in contrast to Eopolycotylus. Neither the humerus or the femur bears an articular facet for the lower limb, unlike Trinacromerum. The primary epipodials - the radius and ulna on the front flipper, and the tibia and fibula on the hind flipper - meet along their entire lengths with no openings, and they are wider than they are long - all traits shared with other polycotylines. In Trinacromerum, however, these bones are less wide such that they appear to be roughly equal-sided.

Each flipper bore five digits; the second and fourth are the longest in the front flippers, and the fourth is the longest in the hind flippers. Across all of the flippers, the phalanges on the third digit have a length/width ratio of 1.77 - similar to Trinacromerum, longer than the 1.45 of Dolichorhynchops, and shorter than the 1.9 of Palmulasaurus. This may be indicative of Mauriciosaurus having retained the more primitive pattern of long phalanges. All of the phalanges in the digits interlock, like other polycotylids. Another trait Mauriciosaurus shares with other polcotylines is that it bears only three distal tarsals as opposed to four, with the second and third having fused into a single structure.

=== Soft tissue ===
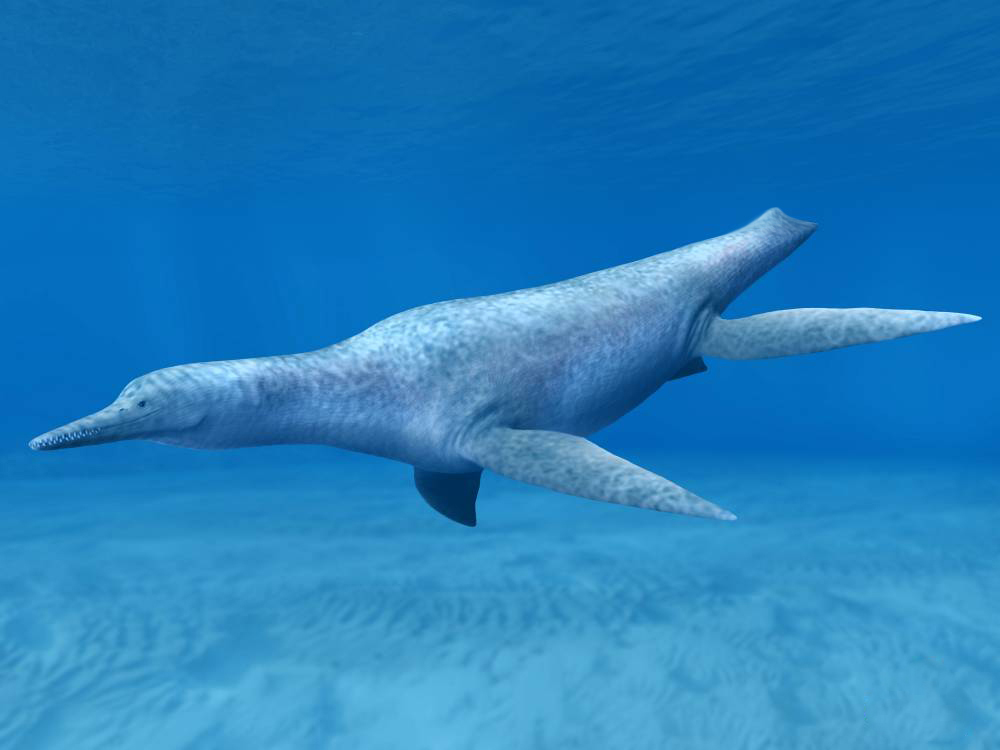
Life restoration

There are five different types of soft tissue preserved in the type specimen of Mauriciosaurus. The first type consists of a largely amorphous glossy black material, bearing some traces of fibres, or wrinkles, which is preserved only within the body cavity, mostly on the right side of the torso. This most likely represents the heavily-pigmented peritoneum, which would have lined the inside of the body cavity in life. Another type of tissue consists of dark grey, thin, and rectangular structures 12 mm (0.47 in) long and 2 mm (0.079 in) wide, organized in parallel rows. They are found at the base of the neck, along the flanks of the torso, and behind the femur of the hind flipper. These likely represent the scale-like tubercles that would have covered the underside of the animal. At the junction between the femur and the body, they become larger, more trapezoidal, and radially arranged to form a folding surface; meanwhile, on the back edge of the flippers, these structures become sub-circular, which enhances the flexibility of the skin.

A third type of tissue, which is thick, red, amorphous, and sharply offset from the surrounding rock, likely represents remnants of decayed skin and subcutaneous tissue. The thickness of the preserved tissue may be a consequence of the skin's retention of flexibility after death, or the subcutaneous tissue being genuinely thick. Patches of this tissue are also found behind the left humerus and along the back edge of the right hind flipper; this suggests that each of the flippers bore a flexible trailing edge. An even thicker substance, which is dark red or dark grey, is also found at the back of the trunk as well as the bases of the right hind flipper and tail. This substance, which is crisscrossed by a series of straight furrows that divide it into rectangular or trapezoidal segments, is of unknown, but probably epidermal, provenance. Finally, a grey, glossy, amorphous substance, which forms a thick cone surrounding the base of the tail, probably represents subcutaneous fat.

== Classification ==
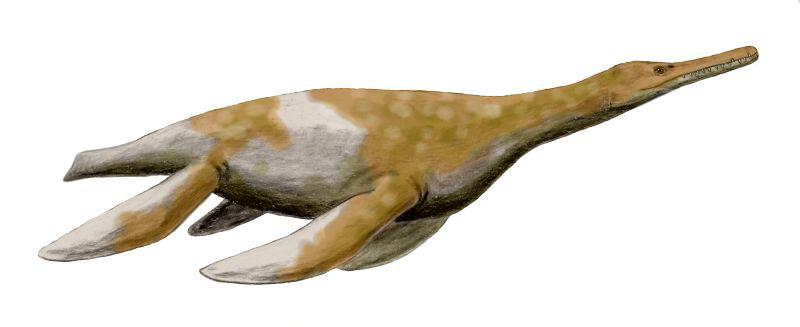
Restoration of Trinacromerum bentonianum, a species considered similar to Mauriciosaurus due to multiple morphological traits

In 2017, Mauriciosaurus was assigned to the Polycotylidae by Frey et al. based on characteristics of the pterygoid, mandible, humerus, and phalanges as previously described. Additional characteristics used to refer Mauriciosaurus to Polycotylidae included the reduced number of cervical vertebrae relative to other plesiosaurs in the Leptocleidia, as well as the presence of several additional ossifications supporting the epipodials of the flippers. Within the Polycotylidae, Mauriciosaurus could be assigned to the clade Polycotylinae based on the length/width ratio of the humerus, the lack of an opening (the antebrachial foramen) between the radius and ulna, the presence of three distal tarsals, the primary epipodials being wider than they are long, and the presence of more than twenty vertebrae in the trunk.

Within the Polycotylinae, Frey et al. considered Mauriciosaurus to be morphologically closest to Dolichorhynchops and Trinacromerum. Mauriciosaurus is more similar to Dolichorhynchops in the rounded ends of its humerus and femur; meanwhile, it is more similar to Trinacromerum in its expanded pterygoid rods, bifurcated front end of the parasphenoid, and relatively longer phalanges. It differs from both genera in the W-shaped ridges present on the back of the bottom surface of its pterygoid, as well as the possession of more tooth positions in the premaxilla and maxilla. In addition to these characteristics, others used by Frey et al. to diagnose Mauriciosaurus as a new genus included the narrow interpterygoid vacuities, the lack of perforations in the coracoids, and the highly specialized arrangement of the gastralia.

== Paleobiology ==
Mauriciosaurus probably pursued small prey, due to its slender snout and small, pointed teeth. The soft tissue structures interpreted as the peritoneum of Mauriciosaurus would have been richly pigmented by melanocytes. In living squamates which reside in deserts or at high altitudes, pigmentation of the peritoneum protects the body cavity against solar ultraviolet radiation, thereby preventing damage to reproductive organs. As a surface-swimming plesiosaur, Mauriciosaurus would have been frequently exposed to solar radiation, and thus a pigmented peritoneum would have been advantageous particularly during the early stages of its life. However, a black peritoneum is also found in chickens and some teleost fish, in which its function is currently unknown.

=== Locomotion and body shape ===
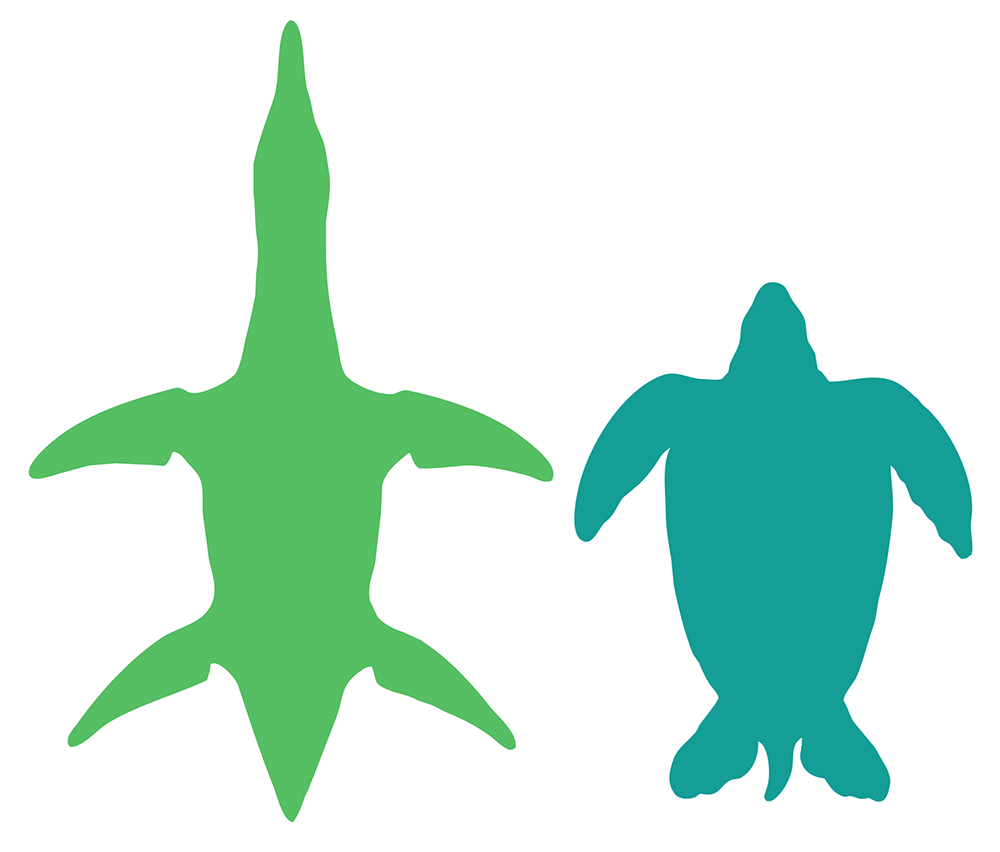
"Drop-shape" of Mauriciosaurus compared to leatherback turtle

Subcutaneous adipose tissue was likely responsible for streamlining the body of Mauriciosaurus, as is also seen in marine mammals. The presence of subcutaneous fat may account for the thick layers of tissue that constitute the third type of preserved soft tissue in the type specimen. On the tail, the small neural spines, haemal arches, and transverse processes suggest the hypaxial muscles of the tail were weak; the preserved cone of soft tissue around the tail thus plausibly represents contour fat, which served to stabilize the tail while continuing the outline of the torso onto the tail in a manner not unlike fat-tailed geckos and other geckos. This forms a "drop-shaped" hydrodynamic body outline, with the thickest part of the body being located in the front third, and the torso and tail forming a single cohesive unit.

As inferred from the soft tissue preserved behind the flippers, each of the flippers in Mauriciosaurus was heavily muscled and bore a flexible trailing edge made of skin. The trailing edge allowed each flipper to form a hydrofoil that would have enhanced locomotion, as has been previously hypothesized for plesiosaurs. Given the immobile body and the neck stiffened by overlapping cervical ribs, the flippers would have been the only source of locomotion. Overall, the anatomical features of Mauriciosaurus are reminiscent of contemporary sea turtles; in particular, the body outline of the leatherback sea turtle, Dermochelys coriacea, strongly resembles that of Mauriciosaurus. D. coriacea swims at an average velocity of 7 kilometres per hour (4.3 mph), which is consistent with estimates of the swimming speeds of Mesozoic marine reptiles; however, Mauriciosaurus would have been capable of attaining higher speeds due to involving all four limbs in locomotion.

=== Taphonomic considerations ===
Frey et al. hypothesized the thick contour fat of plesiosaurs such as Mauriciosaurus may account for the scarcity of preserved skin from members of the group. After death, in most cases, the rotting and putrefaction of the subcutaneous fat would have quickly broken apart the relatively thin skin. Mauriciosaurus, however, fell on its back into soft, soupy, water-soaked, and anoxic sediment of a temperature between 21–37 °C (70–99 °F). These conditions allowed the subcutaneous fat to condense into adipocere instead of decaying, which preserved the skin on the top half of the body. However, the exposed portions of the belly largely decayed prior to burial, collapsing the body cavity and gastralia.

== Paleoecology ==
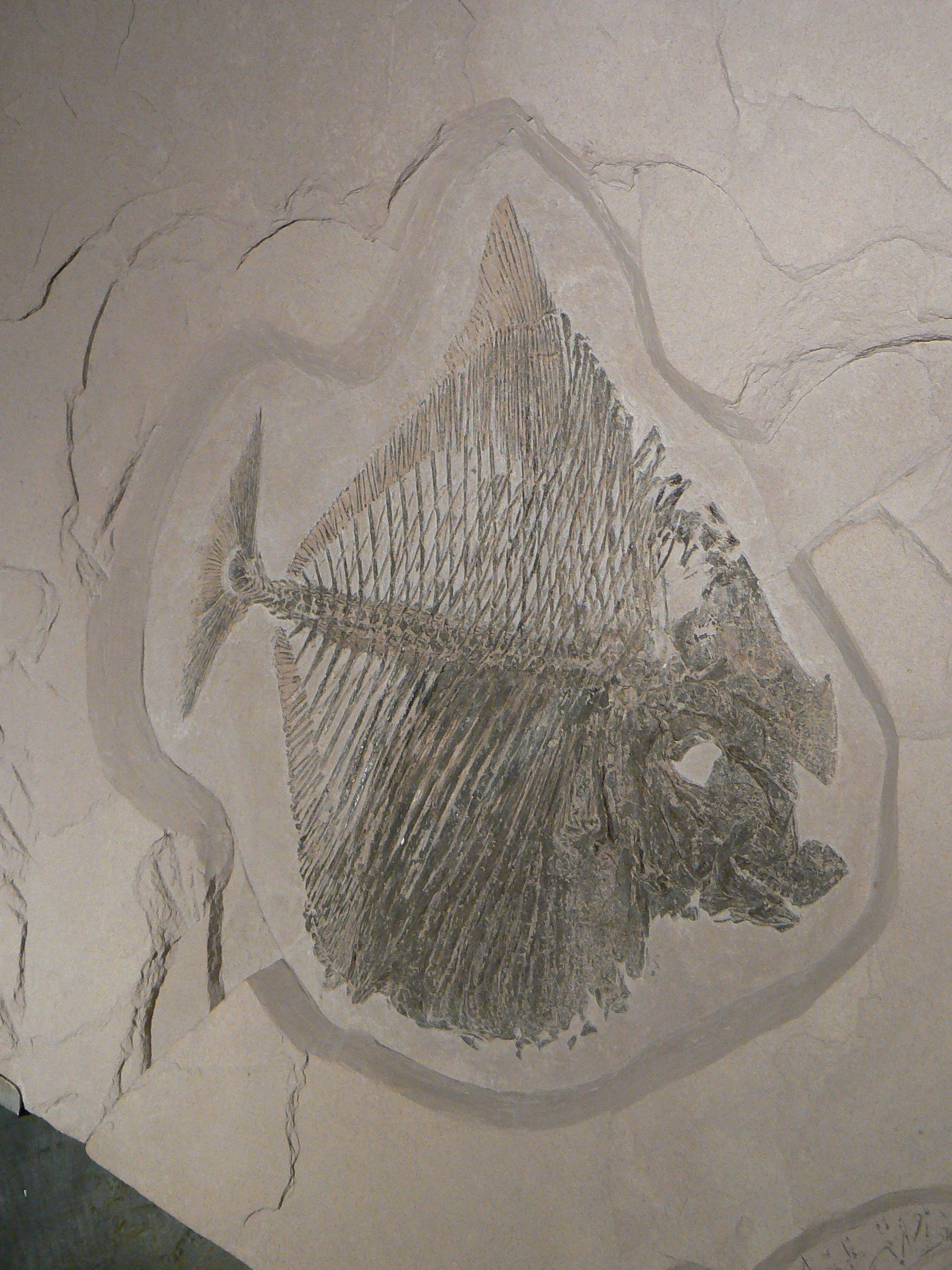
Paranursallia gutturosa, a ray-finned fish present throughout the Vallecillo plattenkalk

During the Turonian, the Vallecillo plattenkalk would have been part of a relatively flat (i.e. low relief) open-ocean deep shelf, located about 500 kilometres (310 mi) offshore at the junction between the Western Interior Seaway and the prehistoric Gulf of Mexico. Mauriciosaurus is thus the first juvenile polycotylid specimen known to have not been preserved in a shallow-water environment. The oxygen-poor seafloor would have prevented carnivores, scavengers, or substrate-dwelling animals from feeding on the deposited carcasses, explaining the quality of preservation along with the absence of waves or currents. In part, the anoxic conditions can be contributed to Oceanic Anoxic Event 2, which occurred at the Cenomanian-Turonian boundary.

Asides from Mauriciosaurus, a variety of invertebrates are also preserved in the Vallecillo plattenkalk. By far the most abundant benthic invertebrates are inoceramid bivalves, which may have lived in symbiosis with chemoautotrophic microbes in order to survive in the low-oxygen conditions.

Three species of Mytiloides are associated with the ammonite Mammites nodosoides at Vallecillo, and may thus have lived alongside Mauriciosaurus - namely M. kossmati, M. goppelnensis, and possibly M. mytiloides. Other ammonites that may have coincided with Mauriciosaurus included Pseudaspidoceras flexuosum, Watinoceras coloradoense, and a taxon referred to Vascoceras. The sessile barnacle Stramentum, which grew on ammonite shells, is also known from Vallecillo, but it is impossible to determine what point in time they originated from.

Other vertebrates are also present throughout the Vallecillo plattenkalk, mostly consisting of fish. Taxa that may have lived alongside Mauriciosaurus, from the Mammites nodosoides - Mytiloides kossmati biozone, include the holostean Paranursallia gutturosum, the pachyrhizodontid Goulmimichthys roberti, the plethodid Tselfatia formosa, and the alepisauriform Rhynchodercetis sp. Random surveys also revealed sharks, including Ptychodus mortoni, a lamniform, and the bizarre filter-feeding shark Aquilolamna milarcae; the enchodontoid Robertichthys riograndensis; the crossognathiform Araripichthys sp.; and an indeterminate notacanthid. Tetrapods are much rarer in the Vallecillo plattenkalk, consisting of the well-preserved back half of the aigialosaurid mosasaur Vallecillosaurus bearing soft-tissue impressions, three turtles representing two taxa, and a tooth referred to the pliosaur "Polyptychodon". However, "Polyptychodon" has more recently been considered a nomen dubium, with some of the teeth referred to the taxon being reclassified as those of polycotylids.

== See also ==
- List of plesiosaur genera
- Timeline of plesiosaur research
