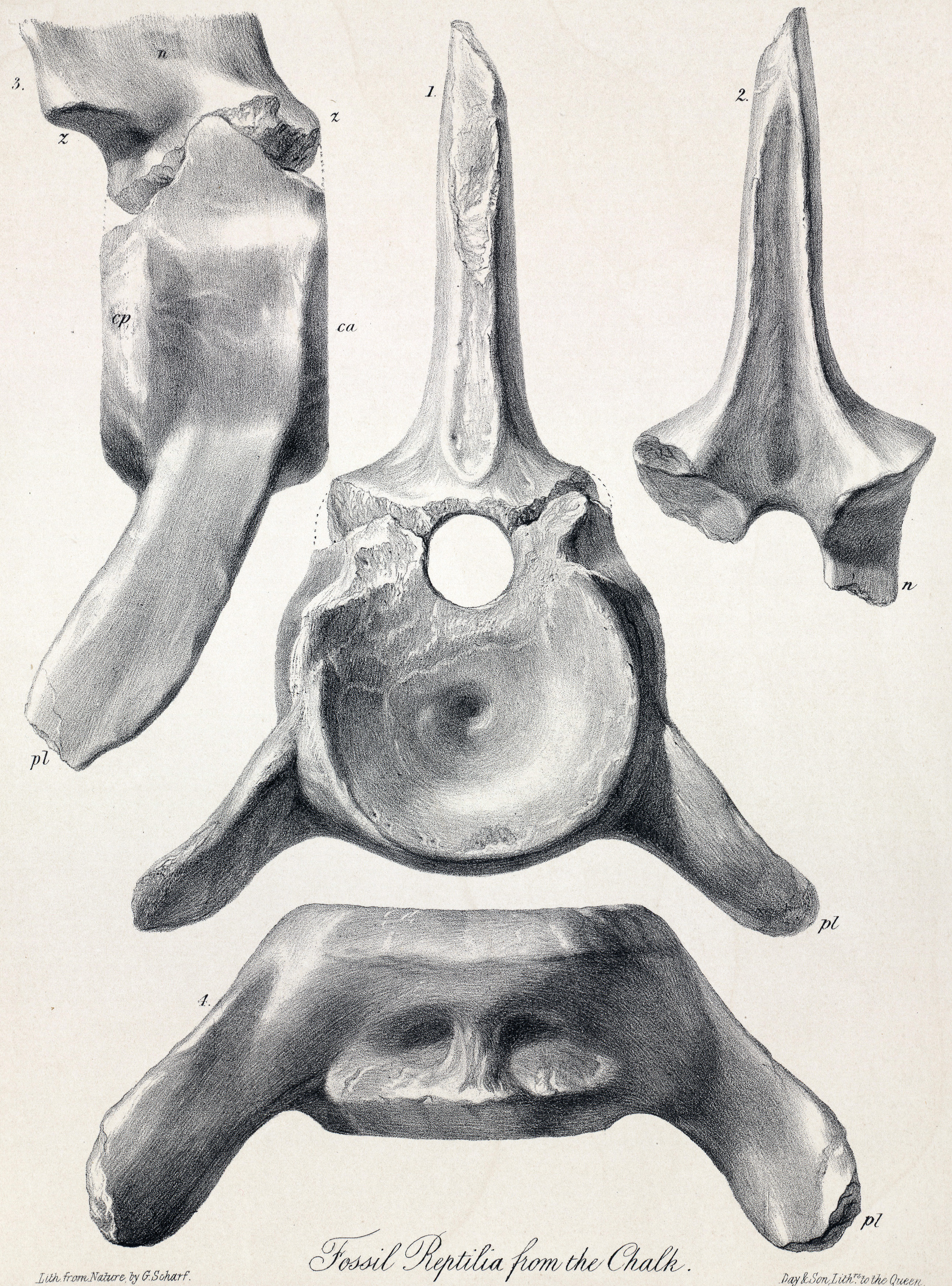
- Holotype vertebra

Scientific classification
- Domain: Eukaryota
- Kingdom: Animalia
- Phylum: Chordata
- Class: Reptilia
- Genus: †Crymocetus; Cope, 1869

Type species
- †Crymocetus bernardi Cope, 1869

Synonyms
- Cimoliasaurus bernardi Lydekker, 1889; Plesiosaurus bernardi Owen, 1850

= Crymocetus =

Crymocetus Temporal range: Late Cretaceous

Extinct genus of reptiles

Crymocetus (meaning "cold sea monster") is an extinct genus of Reptilia from the Late Cretaceous Chalk Group of Sussex, England. It is only known from the type species, which is C. bernardi.

== Discovery and naming ==
The holotype consists of a single posterior cervical vertebra which was discovered in the Chalk Group in Sussex, England. It was first named as Plesiosaurus bernardi by Owen (1850). However, Cope (1869) re-studied the holotype and decided that P. bernardi warranted its own genus, which he named Crymocetus.

After Cope (1869) was published, nearly all subsequent authors tended to disregard the name Crymocetus, with Lydekker (1889) synonymising Crymocetus with Cimoliasaurus.

In any case, Crymocetus is in need of restudy along with other plesiosaurs from the Cretaceous deposits of England.

== Classification ==
Cope (1869) initially classified Crymocetus within Elasmosauridae, while Welles (1962) and Persson (1963) instead considered Crymocetus to be either a member of the Pliosauridae or Rhomaleosauridae. Crymocetus is today classified within Plesiosauria incertae sedis.

== See also ==
- Timeline of plesiosaur research
- List of plesiosaurs
