= Brimosaurus =

Brimosaurus Temporal range: Late Cretaceous
- Vertebra

Scientific classification
- Kingdom: Animalia
- Phylum: Chordata
- Class: Reptilia
- Superorder: †Sauropterygia
- Order: †Plesiosauria
- Genus: †Brimosaurus

Species
- Brimosaurus grandis (type) Leidy, 1854

Extinct genus of reptiles

Brimosaurus (meaning "strong lizard") is an extinct genus of plesiosaur from the Late Cretaceous of what is now Arkansas. The type species is Brimosaurus grandis, first named by Joseph Leidy in 1854. The name Brimosaurus is a nomen dubium: the fossils consist of only a few isolated vertebrae, and in 1952 Welles proposed that Brimosaurus was actually synonymous with Cimoliasaurus (which itself is based on dubious material).

== See also ==
- Timeline of plesiosaur research
- List of plesiosaur genera
