= Uronautes =

Uronautes Temporal range: Late Cretaceous, Maastrichtian

Scientific classification
- Kingdom: Animalia
- Phylum: Chordata
- Class: Reptilia
- Superorder: †Sauropterygia
- Order: †Plesiosauria
- Genus: †Uronautes; Cope, 1876

Type species
- †Uronautes cetiformis Cope, 1877

Genus of reptiles

Uronautes is an extinct genus of rhomaleosaurid plesiosaur from the Late Cretaceous Fox Hills Formation of the United States. The type species is U. cetiformis.

== Discovery and naming ==
The holotype, AMNH 5688, consists of several fossilized vertebra, portions of a few limbs, and ribs.

Uronautes cetiformis was first described by the American paleontologist Edward Drinker Cope in 1876. Welles (1956) described the genus as a "nomen dubium", doubting that the remains were evidence of a true genus.

== Etymology ==
The word Uronautes comes from a fusion of the two Greek words Ουρα, meaning "tailed," and Ναυτες, meaning "sailor", or "mariner". The species name of U. cetiformis comes from the Greek word for whale (or any large sea monster), κῆτος and the Latin word forma, which means "shaped", of "formed" meaning "shape".

== Description ==
Like many other rhomaleosaurids, Uronautes was a short-necked plesiosaur. The cervical vertebrae are short, with partially attached processes and double-headed ribs.

== See also ==
- Aptychodon
- Picrocleidus
- Scanisaurus
- List of plesiosaur genera
- Timeline of plesiosaur research
