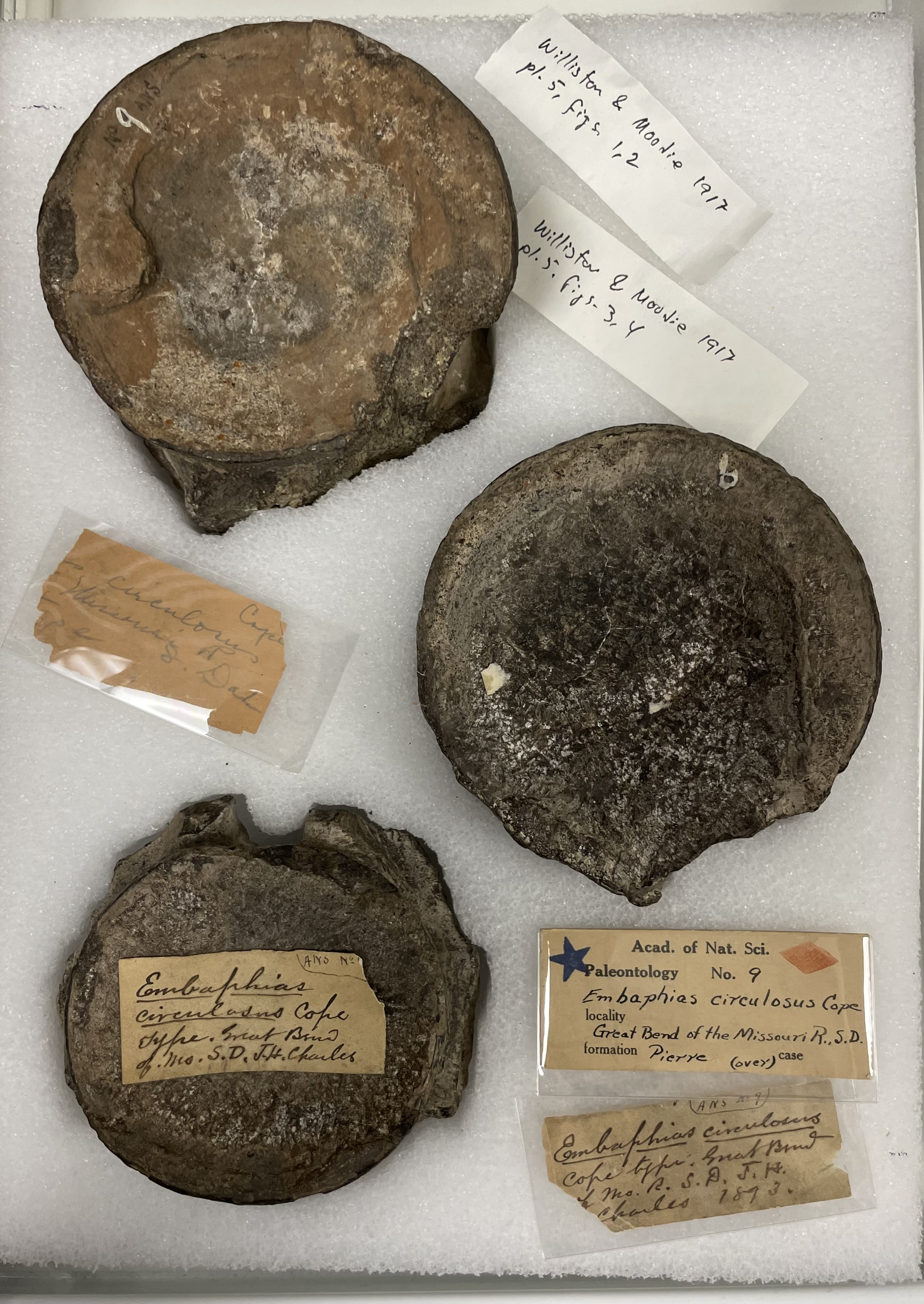
- Three vertebral centra belonging to Embaphias circulosus.

Scientific classification
- Kingdom: Animalia
- Phylum: Chordata
- Class: Reptilia
- Superorder: †Sauropterygia
- Order: †Plesiosauria
- Family: †incertae sedis
- Genus: †Embaphias; Cope, 1894

Type species
- †Embaphias circulosus Cope, 1894

= Embaphias =

Embaphias Temporal range: Late Cretaceous (Campanian), 80.64–77 Ma

Dubious genus of plesiosaur

Embaphias is a dubious genus of plesiosaur from the Late Cretaceous of North America. It was named by Edward Drinker Cope on the basis of three cervical vertebrae. The type species is E. circulosus.

== Discovery and naming ==
In 1893, John H. Charles, a man from Sioux City, collected three incomplete plesiosaur vertebrae from strata of the Pierre Formation in Great Bend of the Missouri River, South Dakota. In 1894, American paleontologist Edward Drinker Cope described these vertebrae as coming from a new genus and species of plesiosaur, Embaphias circulosus. The generic name Embaphias derives from the Greek word embaphion, "saucer", and -ias , a suffix for Greek words. The specific name comes from the Latin word circulus, "circle" or "ring". Cope identified one of these vertebrae as a cervical (neck) vertebra and the other two as being dorsal (back) vertebrae.

== Description ==
Embaphias is only represented by three incomplete vertebrae (one cervical and two dorsals). The cervical's overall shape is comparable to that of short-necked plesiosaurs like Polycotylus or one of its relatives. However its age and the concavity of the anterior-posterior faces of the cervical and dorsal centra led Williston and Moodie (1917) to suggest it comes from its own genus. Though, Williston and Moodie (1917) also stated that the specimens "present no generic characters and can not be again recognized until more complete specimens from the same locality and horizon are studied."

The cervical is flattened anterioposteriorly and is overall circular in outline. A large vascular foramen (an opening of bone where blood would flow) is located below the articular rim (area where the centrum would articulate with another centrum) of the cervical centrum. The cervical centrum has a transverse diameter of 84 millimetres (3.3 in), vertical diameter of 78 millimetres (3.1 in), and a side length of 45 millimetres (1.8 in). In contrast, the cervical centra of the other plesiosaur Ogmodirus have a transverse diameter of around 70 millimetres (2.8 in). The dorsal centrum is much larger in comparison, with a transverse diameter of 100 millimetres (3.9 in), vertical diameter of 92 millimetres (3.6 in), and a side length of 55 millimetres (2.2 in). On the lateral sides of the cervical central are a pair of diapophyses that are moderately developed and point vertically.

== See also ==
- List of plesiosaur genera
