= Goniosaurus =

Goniosaurus Temporal range: Maastrichtian

Scientific classification
- Domain: Eukaryota
- Kingdom: Animalia
- Phylum: Chordata
- Class: Reptilia
- Superorder: †Sauropterygia
- Order: †Plesiosauria
- Family: †Elasmosauridae
- Genus: †Goniosaurus; Meyer, 1860

Type species
- Goniosaurus binkhorsti Meyer, 1860

Extinct genus of reptiles

Goniosaurus is an extinct genus of plesiosaur from the Late Cretaceous (Maastrichtian age) of the Nekum Chalk, in the Netherlands. The only species so far described, G. binkhorsti is represented only by an isolated, compressed and slender tooth described by Christian Erich Hermann von Meyer and a referred tooth and possibly two cervical vertebrae that shows that it was an elasmosaurid, as many other Late Cretaceous plesiosaurs from Europe. The generic name is derived from the Greek gonia, "angle", referring to the fact that the striations meets each other under an angle pointing to below, i.e. the root of the tooth, instead of towards the apex. Johannes Theodorus Binkhorst in 1857 drew Meyer's attention to the tooth in the collection of Ignaz Beusel and was rewarded for this by having the specific name named after him. Goniosaurus binkhorsti was already named by Meyer in 1858 but not fully described.

== See also ==
- List of plesiosaur genera
- Timeline of plesiosaur research
