= Orophosaurus =

Scientific classification
- Kingdom: Animalia
- Phylum: Chordata
- Class: Reptilia
- Superorder: †Sauropterygia
- Genus: †Orophosaurus; Cope, 1851

Genus of reptiles

Orophosaurus is an dubious genus of elasmosaurid plesiosaur from the Late Cretaceous of New Mexico.

== Taxonomy ==
Orophosaurus is known only from the type species, O. pauciporus, which is based on AMNH 5692 (portions of three cervical vertebrae). The holotype was found in the Late Cretaceous Fox Hills Formation of the San Juan Basin in New Mexico. Welles (1962) judged Orophosaurus to be a nomen vanum because of the very fragmentary nature of the holotype.

== See also ==
- List of plesiosaur genera
- Timeline of plesiosaur research
