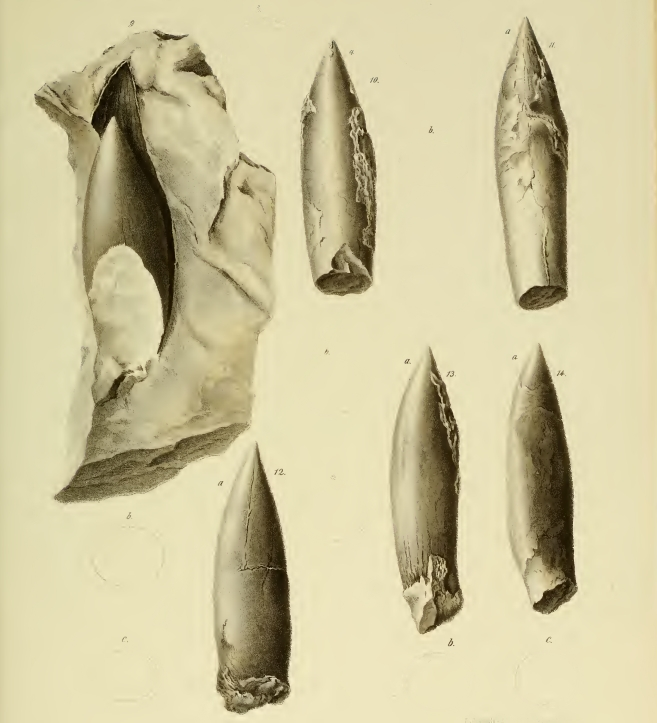
- Teeth from the holotype of A. cretaceus

Scientific classification
- Domain: Eukaryota
- Kingdom: Animalia
- Phylum: Chordata
- Class: Reptilia
- Superorder: †Sauropterygia
- Order: †Plesiosauria
- Genus: †Aptychodon von Reuss, 1855

Type species
- †Aptychodon cretaceus von Reuss, 1855

= Aptychodon =

Aptychodon Temporal range: Late Cretaceous, Turonian

Extinct genus of reptiles

Aptychodon (meaning "unwrinkled tooth") is an extinct genus of plesiosaur from the Late Cretaceous of the Czech Republic. The type species is A. cretaceus.

== Discovery and naming ==
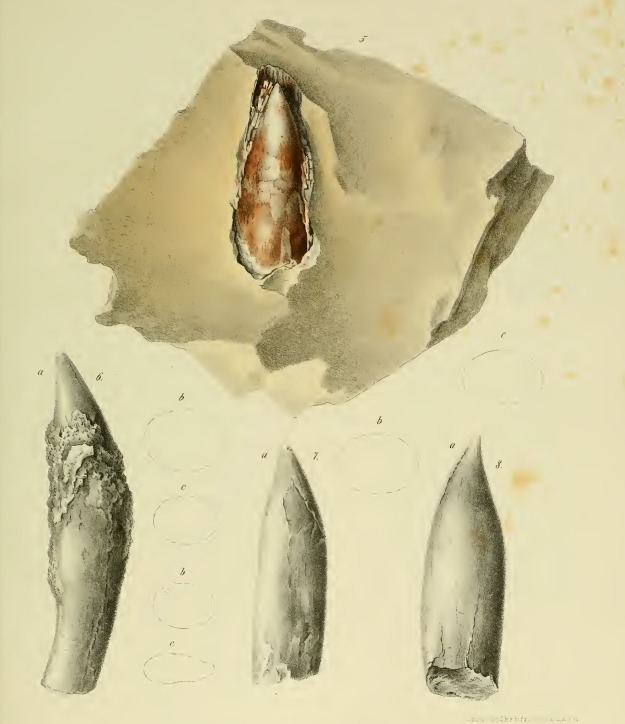
Teeth from the holotype of Aptychodon cretaceus.

The holotype consists of incompletely preserved teeth and they were discovered at White Mountain near Prague, Czech Republic. They were then sent to the Prague Museum before von Reuss (1855) described the teeth and created the species Aptychodon cretaceius.

== Description ==
The teeth of Aptychodon are conical and curved towards one side despite mostly being straight. They also measure between 2.5 centimetres (0.98 in) and 13 centimetres (5.1 in) in length.

== Classification ==
Aptychodon has been classified as a potential synonym of Polyptychodon interruptus by later authors. Most authors classify Aptychodon within a basal position in Plesiosauria.

== See also ==
- Timeline of plesiosaur research
- List of plesiosaur genera
