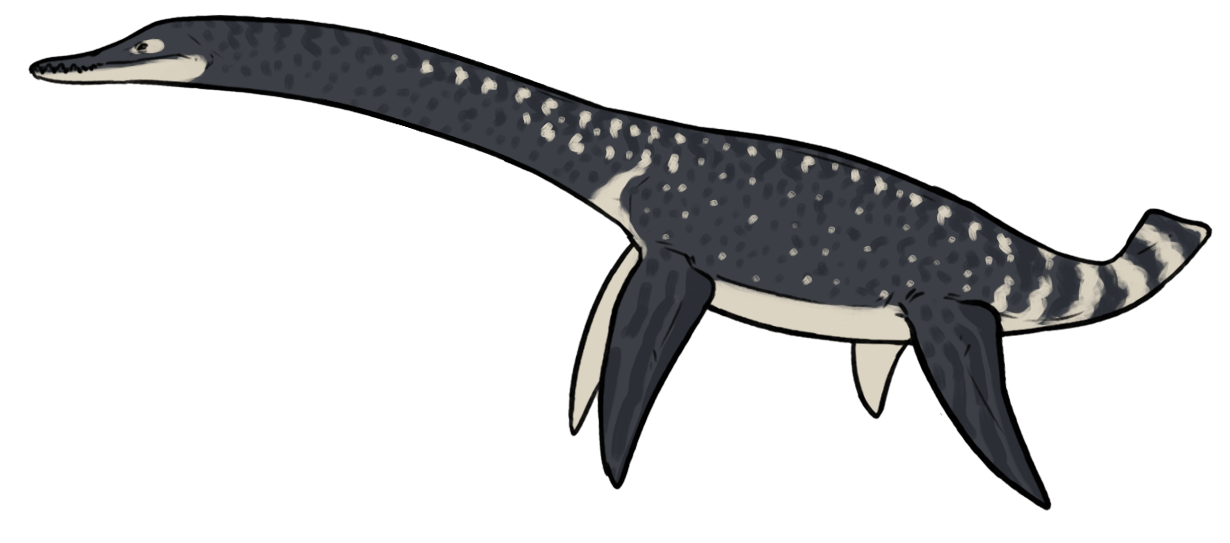
- Speculative life restoration

Scientific classification
- Kingdom: Animalia
- Phylum: Chordata
- Class: Reptilia
- Superorder: †Sauropterygia
- Order: †Plesiosauria
- Superfamily: †Plesiosauroidea
- Family: †Polycotylidae
- Subfamily: †Polycotylinae
- Genus: †Serpentisuchops; Persons, Street & Kelley, 2022
- Species: †S. pfisterae

Binomial name
- †Serpentisuchops pfisterae Persons, Street & Kelley, 2022

= Serpentisuchops =

Serpentisuchops Temporal range: Late Cretaceous, (Lower Maastrichtian)

Genus of polycotylid plesiosaurs

Serpentisuchops (meaning "snaky crocodile-face") is a genus of polycotylid plesiosaur from the late Cretaceous Pierre Shale of Wyoming, United States. The genus contains a single species, S. pfisterae, known from a partial skeleton.

== Discovery and naming ==
The holotype specimen, GPM5001, was found at the Old Woman Anticline in the upper Pierre Shale in 1995 and brought to the collection of the Paleon Museum in Glenrock. This locality is dated to the lower Maastrichtian age of the upper Cretaceous period, around 69.59 to 70.00 million years old. It consists of a partial skull, lower jaw, and vertebral column, in addition to the left ilium and pubis.

In 2022, Serpentisuchops pfisterae was described as a new genus and species of polycotylid plesiosaur by Walter S. Persons, Hallie P. Street, and Amanda Kelley based on these remains. The generic name, "Serpentisuchops", is derived from the Latin words "serpens", meaning "snake", and "suchus" meaning "crocodile", and the Greek word "ops", meaning "face". The specific name, "pfisterae", honors Anna Pfister, on whose land the holotype was discovered.

== Description ==
Life restoration

Serpentisuchops is a medium-sized plesiosaur, reaching over 7 m (23 ft) in total body length. It is unusual among derived plesiosaurs, as it has both a long snout and long neck. In contrast, elasmosaurids and microcleidids had short snouts and elongated necks, and many pliosaurids and other polycotylids had long snouts and short necks. This unusual feature may have evolved because of ecological niche partitioning. Its long, flexible neck may have allowed it to more effectively catch prey by striking from the side.

== Classification ==
In their phylogenetic analyses, Persons, Street & Kelley (2022) recovered Serpentisuchops as a member of the Polycotylinae clade within Polycotylidae, as the sister taxon to Trinacromerum, Georgiasaurus, and Dolichorhynchops spp. The long snout of Serpentisuchops was likely an ancestral trait, while the long neck was secondarily derived and convergent with ancestral plesiosaurs, contemporary elasmosaurids, and some more basal members of the Polycotylidae. The cladogram below displays the results of their phylogenetic analyses.

- Polycotylinae
  - - Eopolycotylus
    - Polycotylus
  - - Serpentisuchops
    - - Dolichorhynchops tropicensis (Scalamagnus)
      - - Trinacromerum
        - - Dolichorhynchops osborni
          - - Dolichorhynchops bonneri (Martinectes)
            - Dolichorhynchops herschelensis
            - Georgiasaurus
