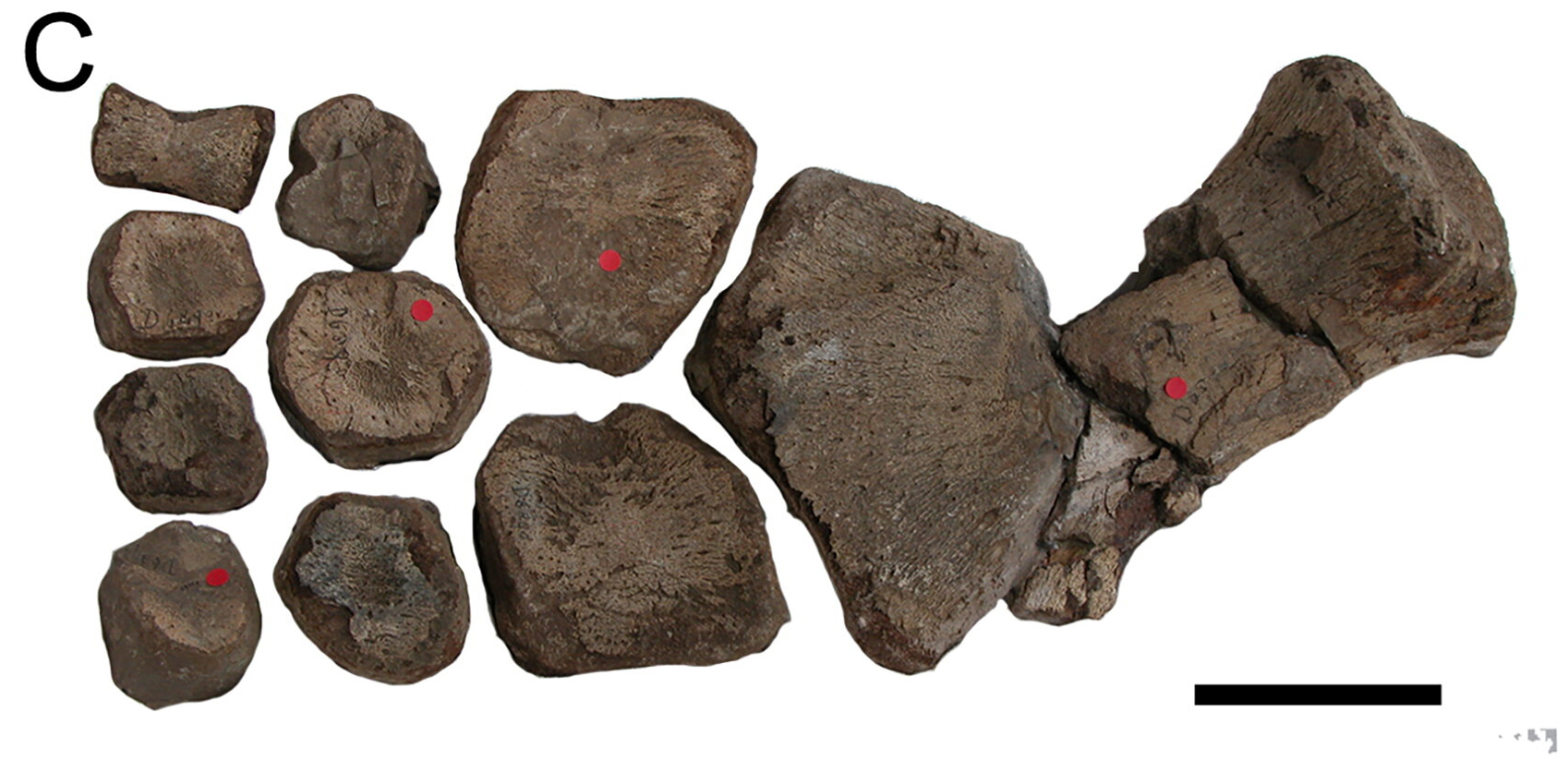
- Holotype paddle

Scientific classification
- Kingdom: Animalia
- Phylum: Chordata
- Class: Reptilia
- Superorder: †Sauropterygia
- Order: †Plesiosauria
- Superfamily: †Plesiosauroidea
- Family: †Elasmosauridae
- Genus: †Woolungasaurus; Persson, 1960

Species
- †Woolungasaurus glendowerensis

= Woolungasaurus =

Woolungasaurus Temporal range: Early Cretaceous

Extinct species of reptile

Woolungasaurus ('Woolunga lizard', named after an Aboriginal mythical reptile, Persson 1960) is a dubious genus of plesiosaur, an extinct marine reptile, belonging to the Elasmosauridae.

== History ==
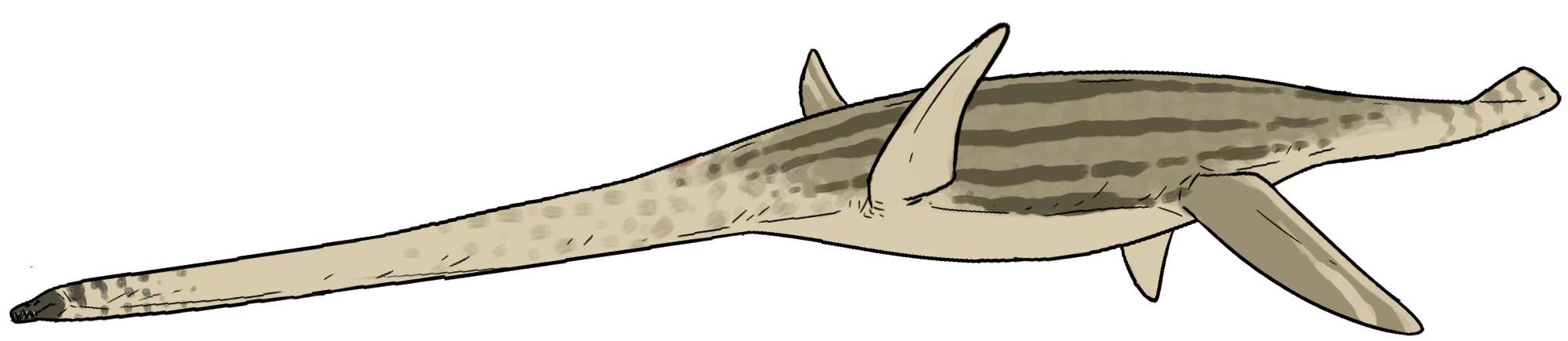
Life restoration

The type species, Woolungasaurus glendowerensis, was named after Glendower Station by Per Ove Persson in 1960, is known from a partial skeleton, holotype QM F6890, (forty-six vertebrae, ribs, forearms, shoulder girdle and part of the rear limbs) unearthed from the Wallumbilla Formation (Albian, Lower Cretaceous) of the Richmond District, Queensland, Australia. However, as it became clear that the genus was a wastebasket taxon which accumulated various elasmosaurid bones, it was later reclassified as Elasmosauridae indet. Another find of undetermined species, consisting of twelve vertebrae, was unearthed from the Maree Formation (Cretaceous, of uncertain age) of Neales River, near Lake Eyre, South Australia. A skull formerly referred to this genus from Yambore Creek, near Maxwelton, Queensland, is now the holotype of Eromangasaurus.

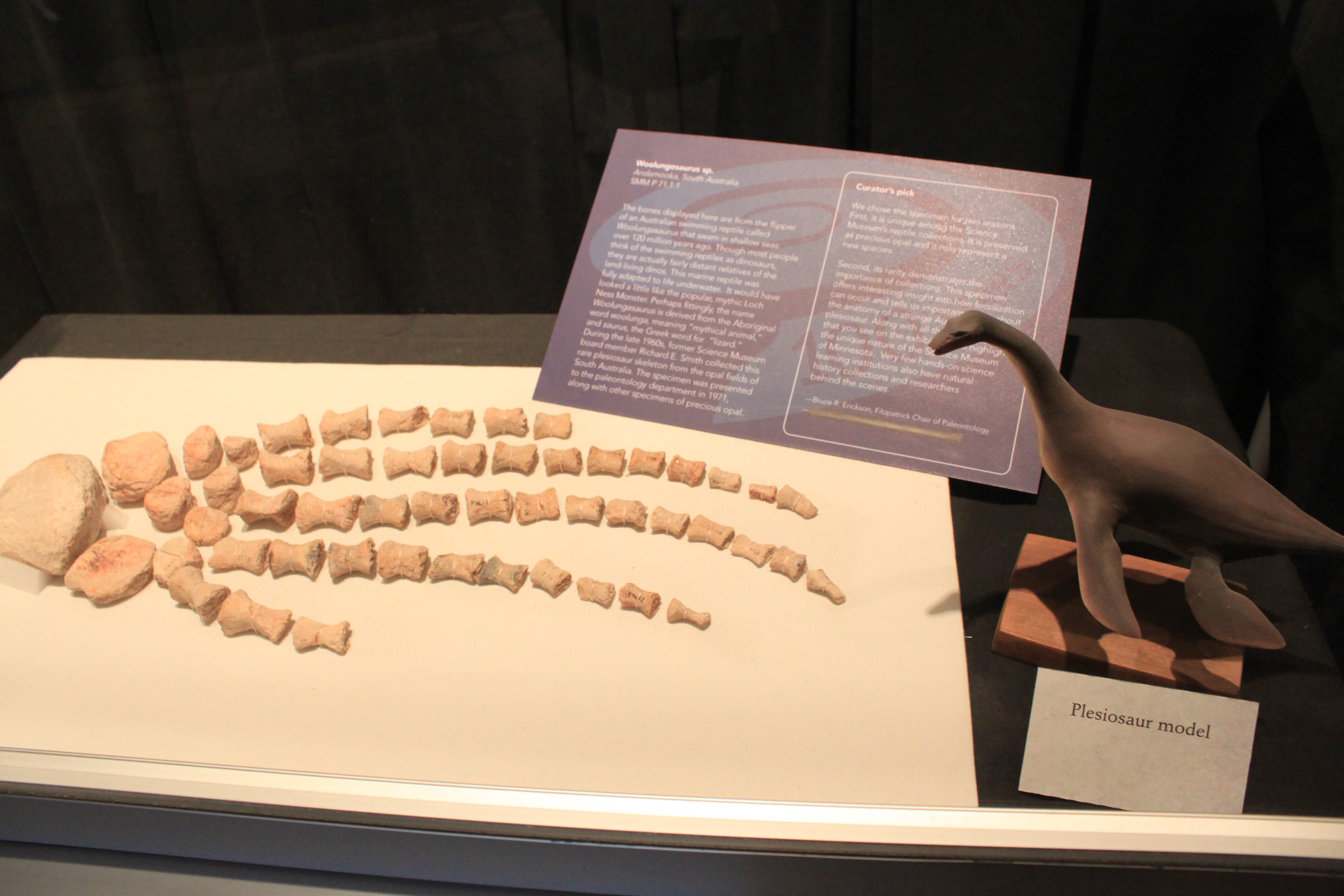
Assigned paddle, Science Museum of Minnesota

However, because of the uninformative, flawed diagnosis of Persson (1960), Welles (1962) considered Woolungasaurus a nomen dubium. In 2004, the genus was referred to Styxosaurus by Sven Sachs in 2004. Kear (2005) disagreed with this view and followed the interpretation by Welles (1962), rendering the genus to be an indeterminate elasmosaurid.

== See also ==
- List of plesiosaur genera
- Timeline of plesiosaur research
