= Luetkesaurus =

Luetkesaurus Temporal range: Late Cretaceous

Scientific classification
- Domain: Eukaryota
- Kingdom: Animalia
- Phylum: Chordata
- Class: Reptilia
- Superorder: †Sauropterygia
- Order: †Plesiosauria
- Genus: †Luetkesaurus; Kiprijanoff, 1883

Extinct genus of reptiles

Luetkesaurus is an extinct genus of plesiosaur from the Late Cretaceous of what is now the Kursk area of western Russia. Luetkesaurus was first named by V. Kiprijanoff in 1883, in honor of paleontologist and zoologist Christian Frederich Luetken; no type species has ever been designated. The genus is considered dubious, based on isolated teeth and vertebrae.

== See also ==
- List of plesiosaur genera
- Timeline of plesiosaur research
