= Taphrosaurus =

Scientific classification
- Domain: Eukaryota
- Kingdom: Animalia
- Phylum: Chordata
- Class: Reptilia
- Superorder: †Sauropterygia
- Order: †Plesiosauria
- Genus: †Taphrosaurus; Cope, 1870

Extinct genus of reptiles

Taphrosaurus is an extinct genus of plesiosaur.

== See also ==
- List of plesiosaur genera
- Timeline of plesiosaur research
