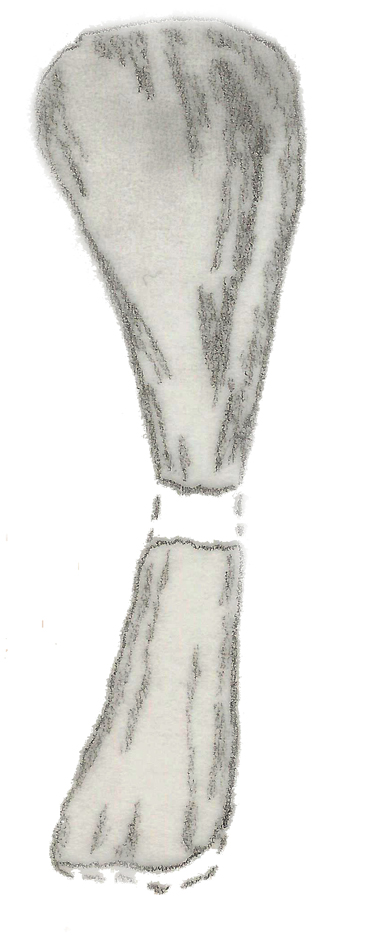
- Humerus of the holotype

Scientific classification
- Kingdom: Animalia
- Phylum: Chordata
- Class: Reptilia
- Clade: Dinosauria
- Clade: Saurischia
- Clade: †Sauropodomorpha
- Clade: †Sauropoda
- Genus: †Dinodocus; Owen, 1884
- Species: †D. mackesoni

Binomial name
- †Dinodocus mackesoni Owen, 1884

Synonyms
- Pelorosaurus mackesoni Woodward, 1908

= Dinodocus =

Dinodocus Temporal range: Early Cretaceous, 125–122 Ma

Extinct genus of dinosaurs

Dinodocus (meaning "terrible beam") is a genus of sauropod dinosaur, named by Richard Owen in 1884, with the type species, Dinodocus mackesoni. The name is now usually considered a nomen dubium. The name was given to some fossil bones from the Lower Greensand Group (Lower Cretaceous) of Hythe, Kent, England, were formerly placed in the genus Pelorosaurus (Mantell, 1850), but a review by Upchurch et al. (2004) concluded that Dinodocus is a nomen dubium.

== Discovery and naming ==
The holotype was discovered in 1840 by Mr H. B. Mackeson. In 1841, Richard Owen noted on the fossils. The holotype, NHMUK 14695, was listed by Owen as "portions of the corocoid, humerus and ulna, iliac, ischial and pubic bones, a large portion of the shaft of a femur, parts of a tibia and fibula, and several metatarsal bones". Owen assigned the specimen to the pliosaur Polyptychodon. In 1850, Gideon Mantell assigned the specimen to Pelorosaurus but Richard Owen placed the fossils in a separate genus, Dinodocus, in 1884. In 1908, Dinodocus was synonymized with Pelorosaurus again, this time by Arthur Smith Woodward. In 2004, Paul Upchurch and colleagues considered Dinodocus a nomen dubium based on indeterminate sauropod material.
