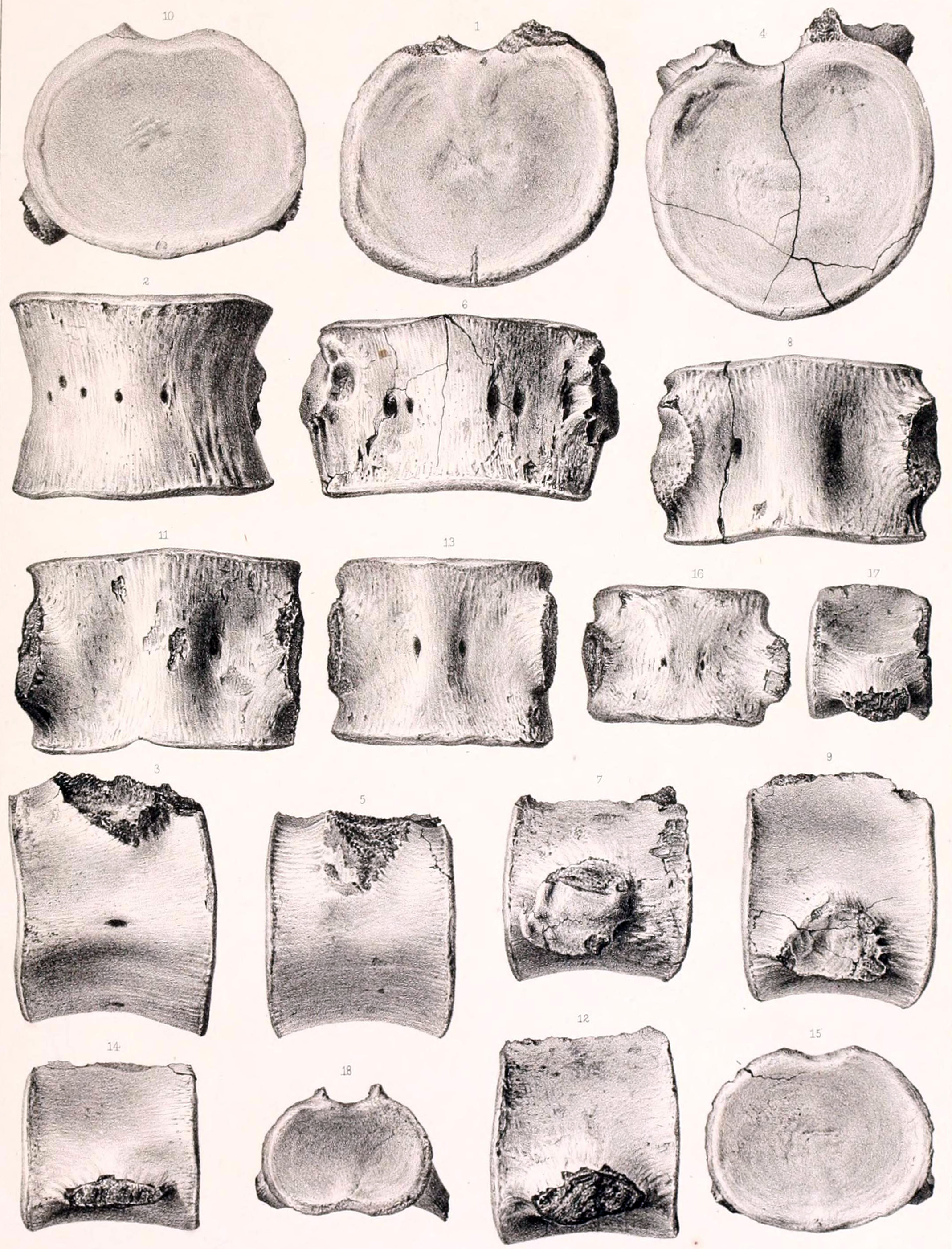
- Cimoliasaurus magnus vertebrae

Scientific classification
- Domain: Eukaryota
- Kingdom: Animalia
- Phylum: Chordata
- Class: Reptilia
- Superorder: †Sauropterygia
- Order: †Plesiosauria
- Family: †Elasmosauridae
- Genus: †Cimoliasaurus; Leidy, 1851

Type species
- †Cimoliasaurus magnus Leidy, 1851

= Cimoliasaurus =

Cimoliasaurus Temporal range: Late Cretaceous, Maastrichtian

Extinct genus of reptiles

Cimoliasaurus was a plesiosaur that lived during the Late Cretaceous (Maastrichtian) of the eastern United States, with fossils known from New Jersey, North Carolina, and Maryland.

== Etymology ==
The name is derived from the Greek Κιμωλία kimolia, meaning "white chalk", and σαύρος sauros, meaning "lizard", in reference to the fact that the deposits in which it was found bear a superficial resemblance to the chalk deposits of the Western Interior Seaway.

== Taxonomic history ==
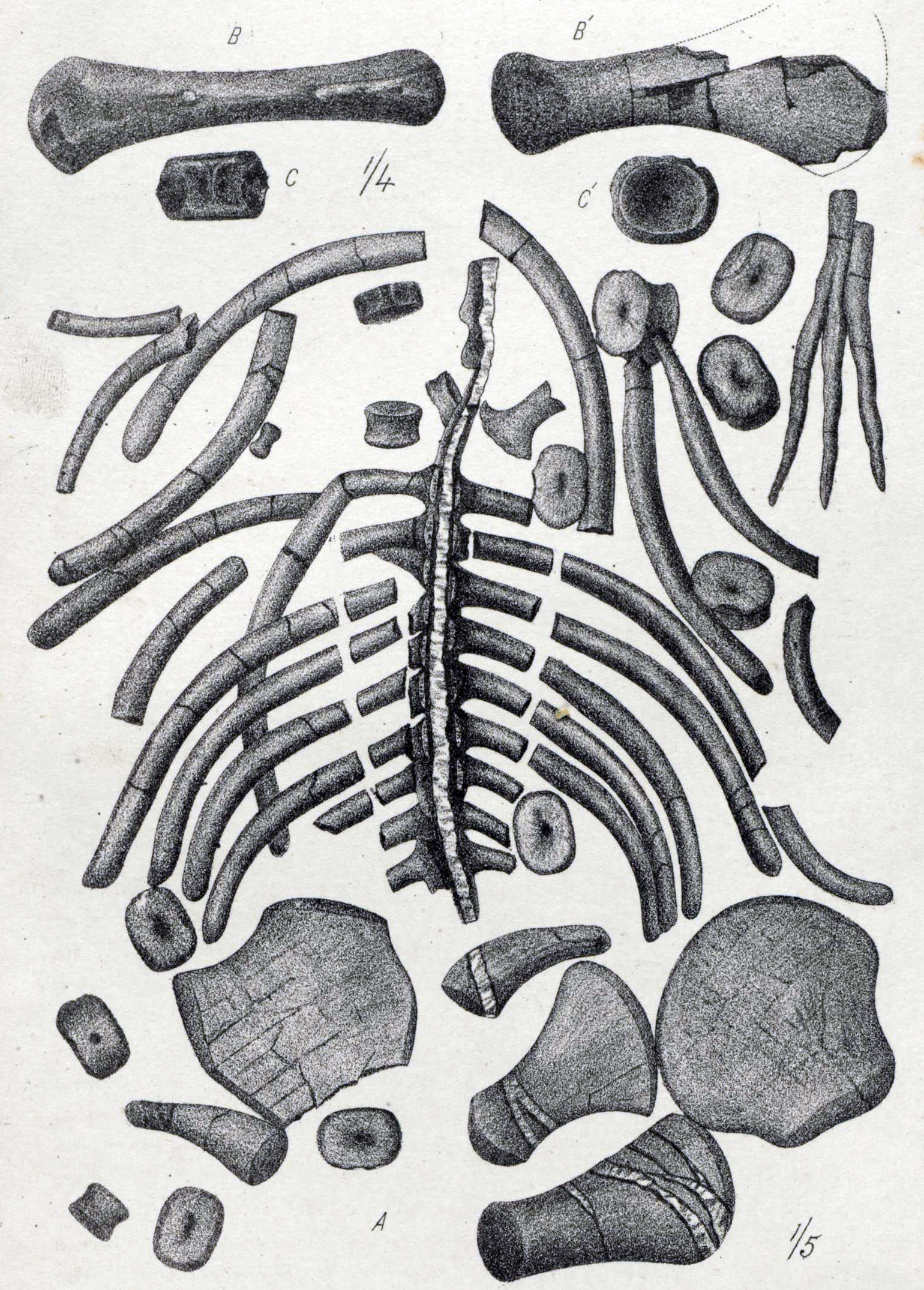
A: Cimoliasaurus australis

The name Cimoliasaurus magnus was coined by Joseph Leidy for ANSP 9235, one anterior and 12 posterior cervical vertebrae collected in Maastrichtian-aged greensand deposits of the New Egypt and Navesink Formations in Burlington County, New Jersey. A specimen is also known from coeval limestone deposits of the Peedee Formation in Pender County, North Carolina. There is also a tentative record from the Maastrichtian-aged Severn Formation in Maryland when in 1988, Colin McEwen discovered a vertebra of a Cimoliasaurus during a school field trip. The discovery is recorded in the National Geographic November 1988 issue.

In his catalogue of plesiosaur and ichthyosaur specimens preserved in the NHM, the British zoologist Richard Lydekker referred several Jurassic and Cretaceous plesiosaur species to Cimoliasaurus, including the new species C. richardsoni (now considered a species of Cryptoclidus) and C. cantabrigiensis, as well as Colymbosaurus and a number of previously described species from the Cambridge Greensand and Chalk Group.

Nowadays, Cimoliasaurus is now recognized as being a derived elasmosaurid, effectively making the family name Cimoliasauridae Delair, 1959 a junior synonym of Elasmosauridae.

=== Misassigned nominal species ===
- Cimoliasaurus laramiensis Knight, 1900, now Tatenectes
- Cimoliasaurus richardsoni Lydekker, 1889, now Cryptoclidus richardsoni
- Cimoliasaurus valdensis Lydekker, 1889, now Hastanectes
- Cimoliasaurus teplicensis Fritsch, 1906 (nomen dubium)

== See also ==
- List of plesiosaur genera
- Timeline of plesiosaur research
