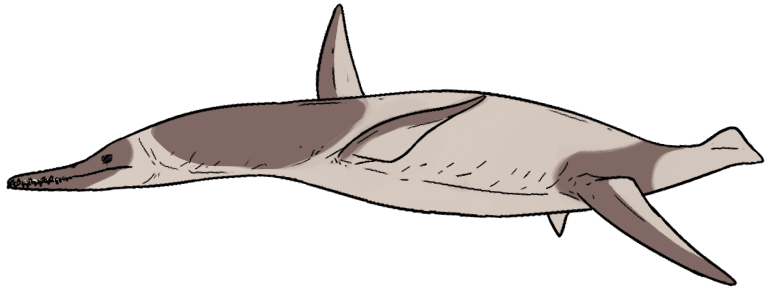
- Life restoration

Scientific classification
- Domain: Eukaryota
- Kingdom: Animalia
- Phylum: Chordata
- Class: Reptilia
- Superorder: †Sauropterygia
- Order: †Plesiosauria
- Family: †Polycotylidae
- Subfamily: †Polycotylinae
- Genus: †Georgiasaurus; Otschev, 1977

Species
- †G. penzensis

Synonyms
- Georgia penzensis

= Georgiasaurus =

Georgiasaurus Temporal range: Late Cretaceous

Extinct genus of reptiles

Georgiasaurus ("Georgy's lizard"; after V. A. Otschev's father, Georgy Otschev, a geodesist who died shortly before Otschev published the description in 1976) is an extinct genus of plesiosaur from the Late Cretaceous of Russia. Otschev (or Ochev) originally named the specimen Georgia, but that name was preoccupied by the colubrid snake Georgia Baird & Girard, 1853. Originally a complete skeleton, the specimen, holotype POKM 11658 consisting of seven neck vertebrae, vertebral impressions, both scapulae and two limbs, was damaged in preparation of the quarry stone. It was found near the village of Zatolokino.

It was a fairly large polycotylid, measuring 4–5 m (13–16 ft) long. Gregory S. Paul estimated its weight at 450 kg (990 lb).

== See also ==
- List of plesiosaur genera
- Timeline of plesiosaur research
