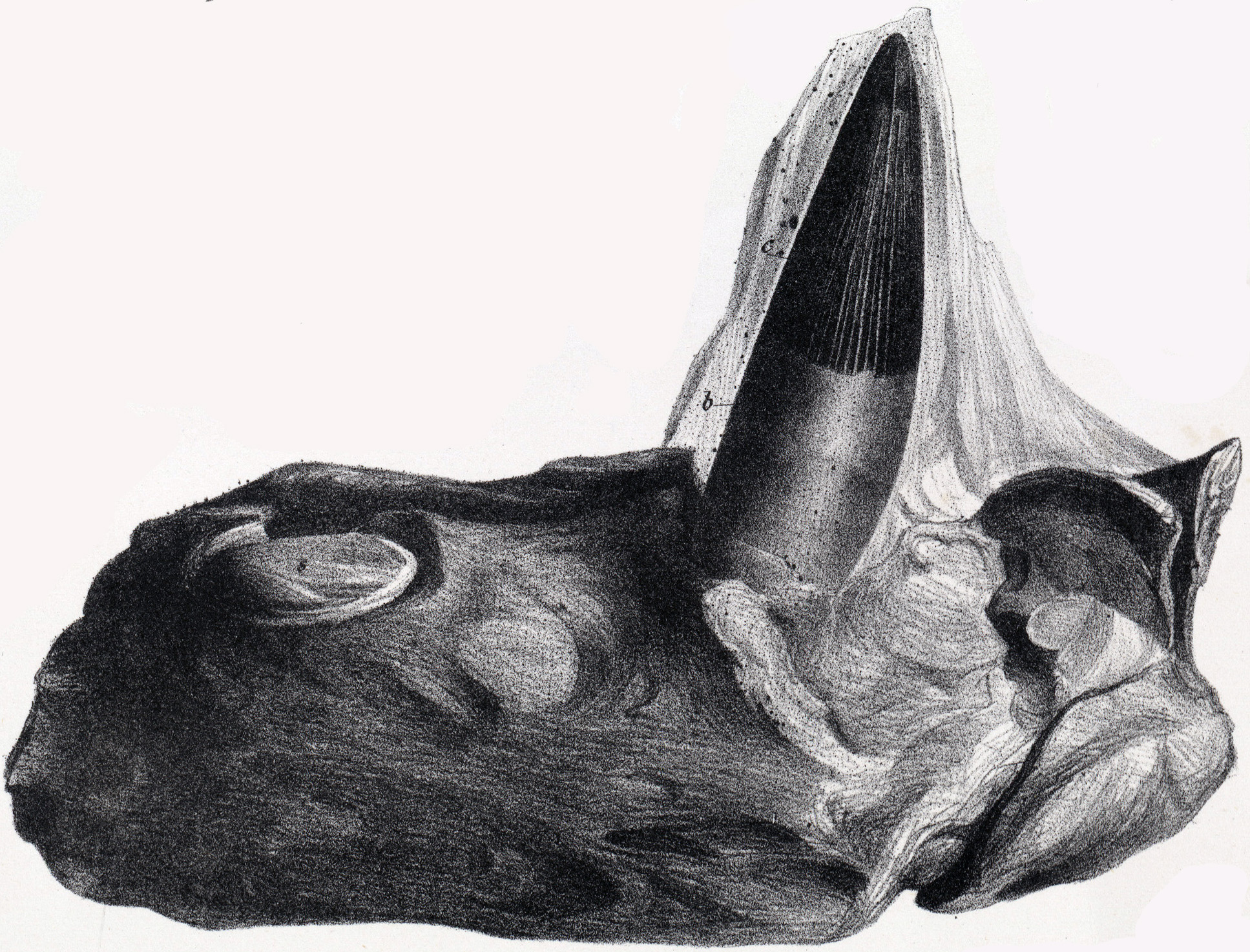
- P. interruptus jaw with tooth

Scientific classification
- Kingdom: Animalia
- Phylum: Chordata
- Class: Reptilia
- Superorder: †Sauropterygia
- Order: †Plesiosauria
- Suborder: †Pliosauroidea
- Family: †Pliosauridae
- Clade: †Thalassophonea
- Subfamily: †Brachaucheninae
- Genus: †Polyptychodon; Owen, 1841

Type species
- †Polyptychodon interruptus Owen, 1841

Other species
- †P. patagonicus? Ameghino, 1893

= Polyptychodon =

Polyptychodon Temporal range: Late Cretaceous, 101–89.3 Ma

Genus of pliosaurid plesiosaur from the Cretaceous period

Polyptychodon (meaning 'many-folded tooth') is a genus of pliosaurid found in Middle-Late Cretaceous marine deposits in southern England, France and Argentina. It has been considered a nomen dubium in a 2016 review.

== History of discovery ==
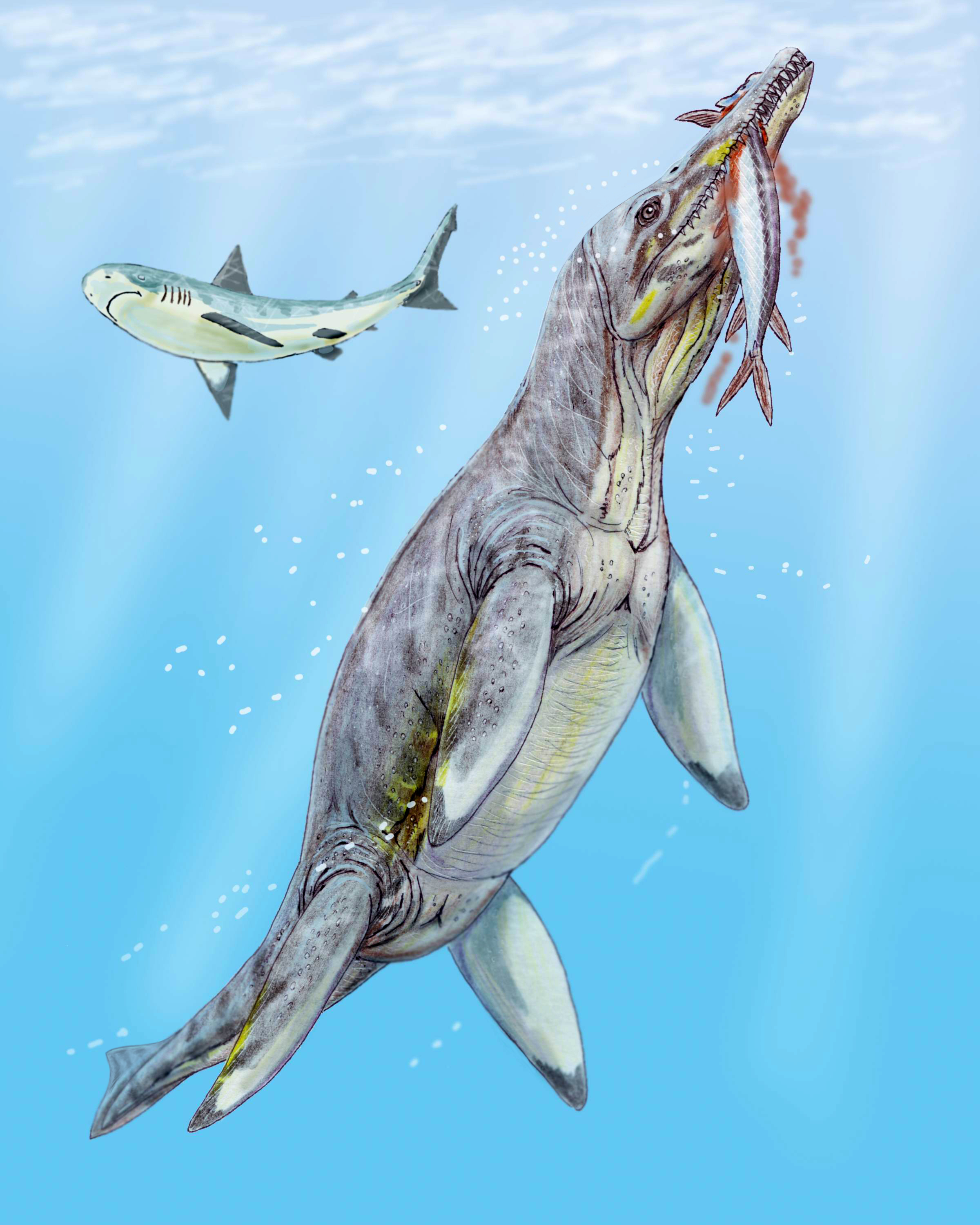
Restoration of P. interruptus

The type species, P. interruptus is known from an isolated tooth from the Late Cretaceous Chalk Group of southern England. Owen described a second nominal species of the genus, P. continuus, from an isolated tooth collected in the Hythe Formation of Maidstone, Kent. (The macronarian sauropod Dinodocus was mistakenly thought to be conspecific with P. continuus before it was correctly recognized as a dinosaur and not a plesiosaur.)

Numerous pliosaurid teeth and vertebrae from England and eastern France have been previously assigned to Polyptychodon, including isolated vertebrae from France which were misidentified as a sauropod. Comparison between Albian-age isolated vertebrae from marine deposits in France and Kronosaurus suggested a size of approximately 7 metres (23 ft) for a Polyptychodon-like brachaucheniine pliosaurid. However, a 2016 re-evaluation found Polyptychodon and its types species to be dubious, and that numerous remains from the Chalk Group in England that had been referred to the genus most likely represent different species of plesiosaurs, with some teeth possibly being referable to Polycotylidae. Similar fossils of pliosaurs were found also in Czech Republic.

The species Polyptychodon patagonicus (Ameghino, 1893), based on crocodile teeth discovered in Argentina, shares the same genus name. According to a 2010 study, P. patagonicus is a nomen vanum and a nomen dubium.

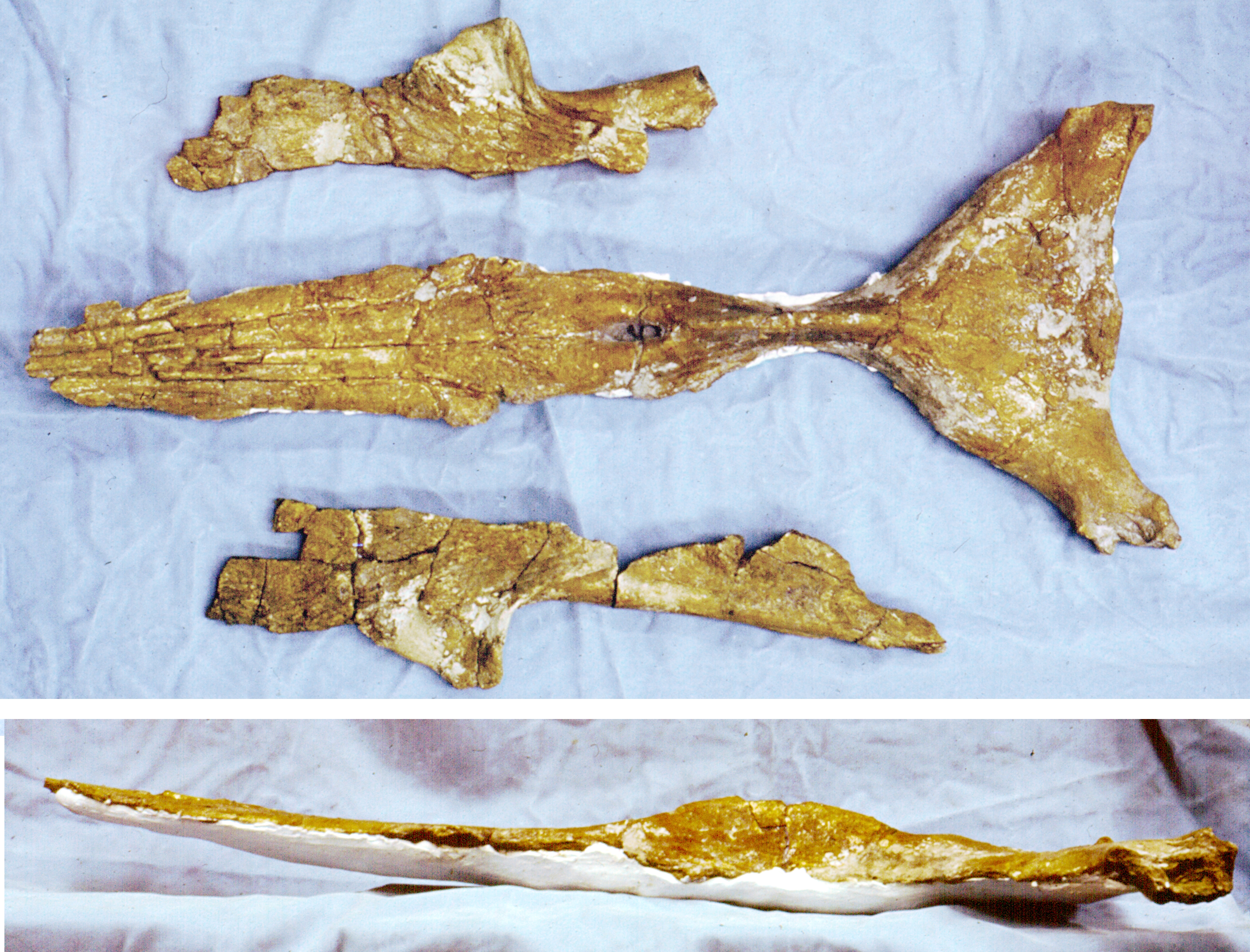
Polyptychocon hudsoni holotype SMU 60313 skull parts (top), skull roof in profile showing extent of the parietal crest. (bottom).

Polyptychodon hudsoni (holotytpe, SMU 60313) was described from the Turonian-age Eagle Ford Formation of Dallas, Texas. It probably belongs to a different genus.

== See also ==
- Timeline of plesiosaur research
