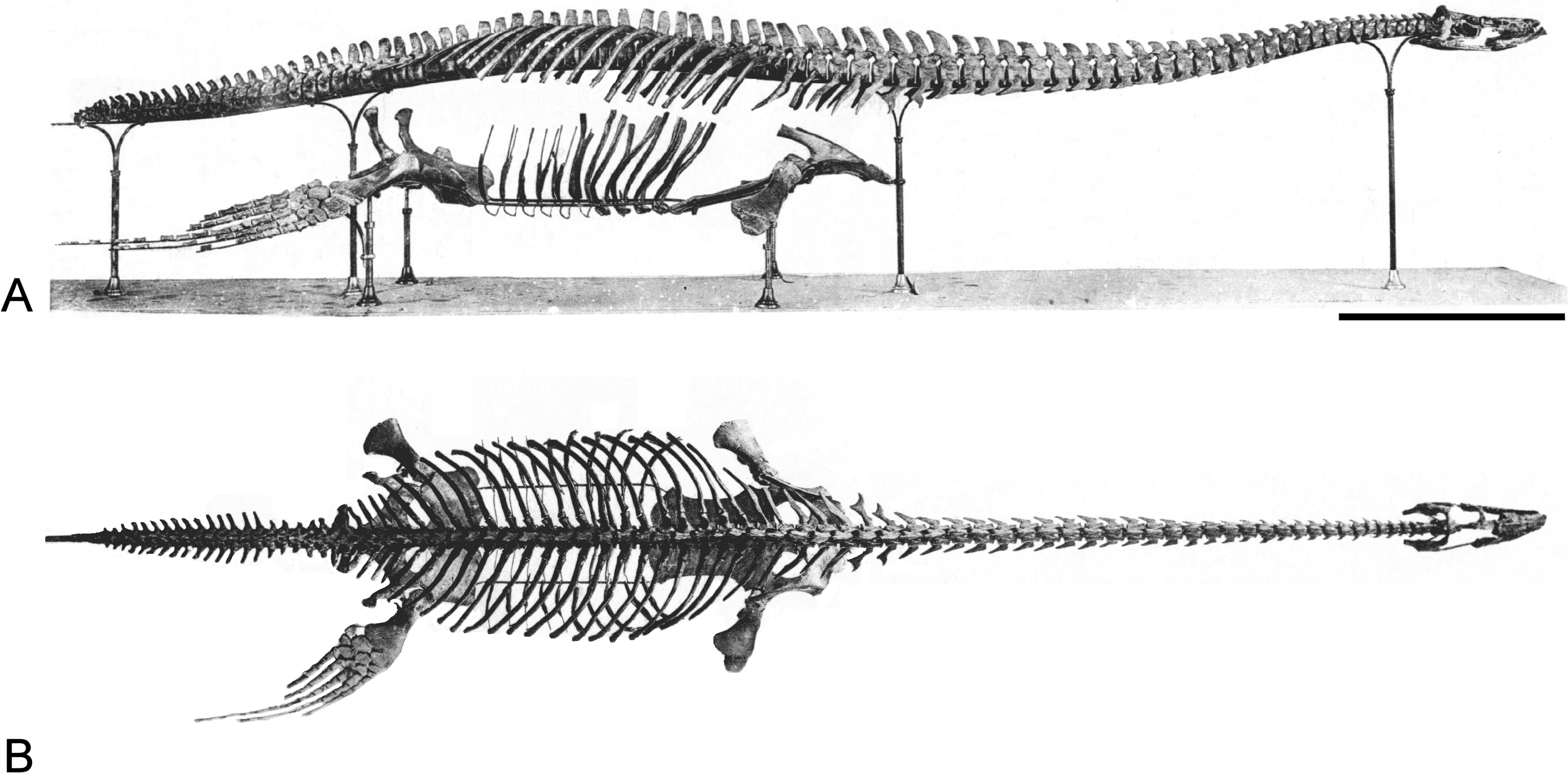
- Holotype specimen

Scientific classification
- Kingdom: Animalia
- Phylum: Chordata
- Class: Reptilia
- Superorder: †Sauropterygia
- Order: †Plesiosauria
- Superfamily: †Plesiosauroidea
- Genus: †Brancasaurus; Wegner, 1914
- Species: †B. brancai

Binomial name
- †Brancasaurus brancai Wegner, 1914

Synonyms
- Plesiosaurus limnophilus? Koken, 1887; Plesiosaurus kanzleri? Koken, 1905; Gronausaurus wegneri Hampe, 2013

= Brancasaurus =

Brancasaurus Temporal range: Early Cretaceous (Berriasian), ~139 Ma

Extinct genus of reptiles

Brancasaurus is a genus of plesiosaur that lived during the Berriasian stage of the Early Cretaceous period in what is now Germany. The only known species is B. brancai, first described in 1914 from a relatively complete fossil skeleton discovered four years earlier near Gronau, North Rhine-Westphalia. The scientific name of the taxon honours the German paleontologist Wilhelm von Branca. The holotype skeleton represents the most complete Early Cretaceous plesiosaur specimen known from Europe. Another, more fragmentary skeleton of the same taxon was assigned to the newly erected genus Gronausaurus in 2013, before being recognized as a junior synonym of Brancasaurus in a revision published three years later. Additional specimens assigned or potentially referable to Brancasaurus have been recovered from the type locality and from Lower Saxony, some of which had previously been referred to the genus Plesiosaurus by Ernst Koken.

With a long neck possessing vertebrae bearing distinctively-shaped "shark fin"-shaped neural spines, and a relatively small and pointed head, Brancasaurus is superficially similar to elasmosaurids, a group to which it was long assigned. It differed, however, by its more reduced size, the probable subadult holotype measuring 3.26 metres (10.7 ft) in length. Since 2010, several phylogenetic analyses have recovered Brancasaurus as a member, or a close relative, of the Leptocleididae. Fossil remains of Brancasaurus originates from deposits who likely represented a large continental freshwater lake.

== Discovery and naming ==
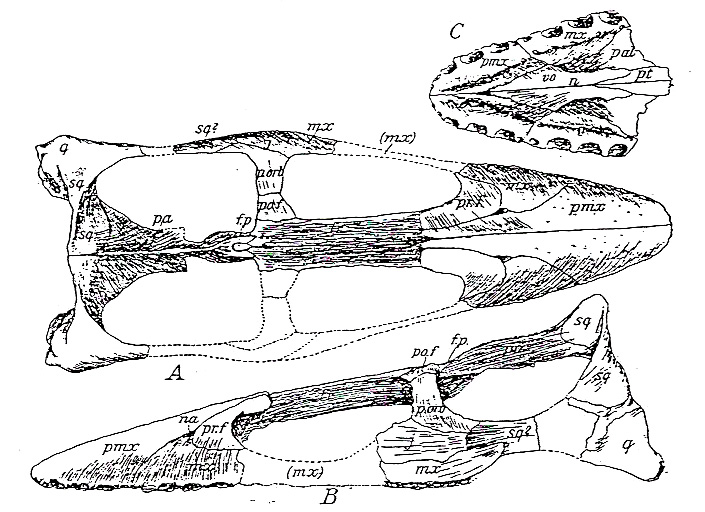
Skull of Brancasaurus in dorsal (a) and lateral (b) view, showing the tip of the snout (c) in ventral view (1914)

The holotype specimen of Brancasaurus brancai originates from a clay pit located near the city of Gronau, North Rhine-Westphalia in Germany. It was discovered in July 1910 by workers in the clay pit, who dug it out using pickaxes; in doing so, they damaged the specimen (in particular, the pubis had been broken into 176 pieces), and left behind a number of small fragments that were later personally collected by paleontologist Theodor Wegner, who in 1914 described the specimen in detail. He published his work in a commemorative volume on the occasion of the seventieth birthday of Wilhelm von Branca, his former mentor in the field, in which he honored by assigning this scientific name of the new taxon. The described specimen is since stored at the University of Münster, where it is numbered as GPMM A3.B4. It is a fairly complete subadult skeleton, consisting of various parts of the skull, most of the vertebrae, several isolated ribs and gastralia, parts of the pectoral and pelvic girdles, both humeri, one femur, and various foot bones from the flippers. Over time, a number of parts have been lost, including several pieces of the skull, teeth, gastralia and caudal vertebrae, a second femur, and a radius, tibia, and fibula. A wax endocast of the brain of the type specimen is stored as SMF R4076 in the Naturmuseum Senckenberg.

The clay pit from which the type specimen originates is part of the Isterberg Formation in the Bückeberg Group, also known in the past as the "German Wealden facies". The Bückeberg Group, which is divided into six zones, belongs to the Berriasian of the Early Cretaceous, with the boundary between the Berriasian and the Valanginian being at the top of the group. The parts of the Isterberg Formation exposed at Gronau belong to the zones "Wealden 5" and "Wealden 6", which correspond to the uppermost-Berriasian. The holotype skeleton thus constitutes the most complete known European plesiosaur specimen from the Early Cretaceous. In the 2016 redescription of Brancasaurus, Sven Sachs and colleagues assigned a second, more fragmentary subadult individual to the genus, numbered as GZG.BA.0079 at the University of Göttingen. This specimen consists of the pubis, ischium, and several vertebral components. It originates from the slightly lower Deister Formation ("Wealden 3") in the Bückeberg Group, and can only be referred to Brancasaurus sp., since it is relatively incomplete and differs in several minor vertebral characteristics from the type of B. brancai. Other probable but isolated Brancasaurus elements come from outcrops of the Isterberg and Fuhse Formations in Lower Saxony; the latter formation is also in the Bückeberg Group. Sachs and colleagues also noted that a cervical centra from Jurassic-Cretaceous boundary strata of the Purbeck Group in southern England exhibits a morphology comparable to that of B. brancai, suggesting that the taxon may have occurred outside Germany.

=== Putative and formal synonyms ===
In a 1887 paper, the German paleontologist Ernst Koken described two species of Plesiosaurus, P. degenhardti and P. limnophilus, based on more or less fragmentary remains discovered in Lower Saxony. The holotype of P. degenhardti consists of a specimen preserving twenty-one dorsal vertebrae and their associated ribs, recovered from Obernkirchen. P. limnophilus, in contrast, was established on the basis of three isolated cervical vertebrae from the localities of Ummeln and Kniggenbrink, with the holotype originating from the former locality. In 1896, Koken referred to P. degenhardti additional twenty-three cervical and pectoral vertebrae from its type locality. In 1905, Koken described additional fossils from the quarry near Gronau, which he likewise referred to the genus Plesiosaurus. Based on this material, he erected the species P. kanzleri on the basis of two dorsal vertebrae, although he suggested that they might instead belong to the pliosaurid Peloneustes because of their morphology. He also referred three posterior cervical vertebrae and three anterior dorsal vertebrae to another species, P. valdensis, which he had previously considered assigning to P. degenhardti. In addition, Koken assigned to the latter species a series of dorsal vertebrae, a sacral vertebra, and fragments of ribs, femora, and the jaw, which he interpreted as belonging to a more complete skeleton that had most likely been destroyed prior to its discovery.

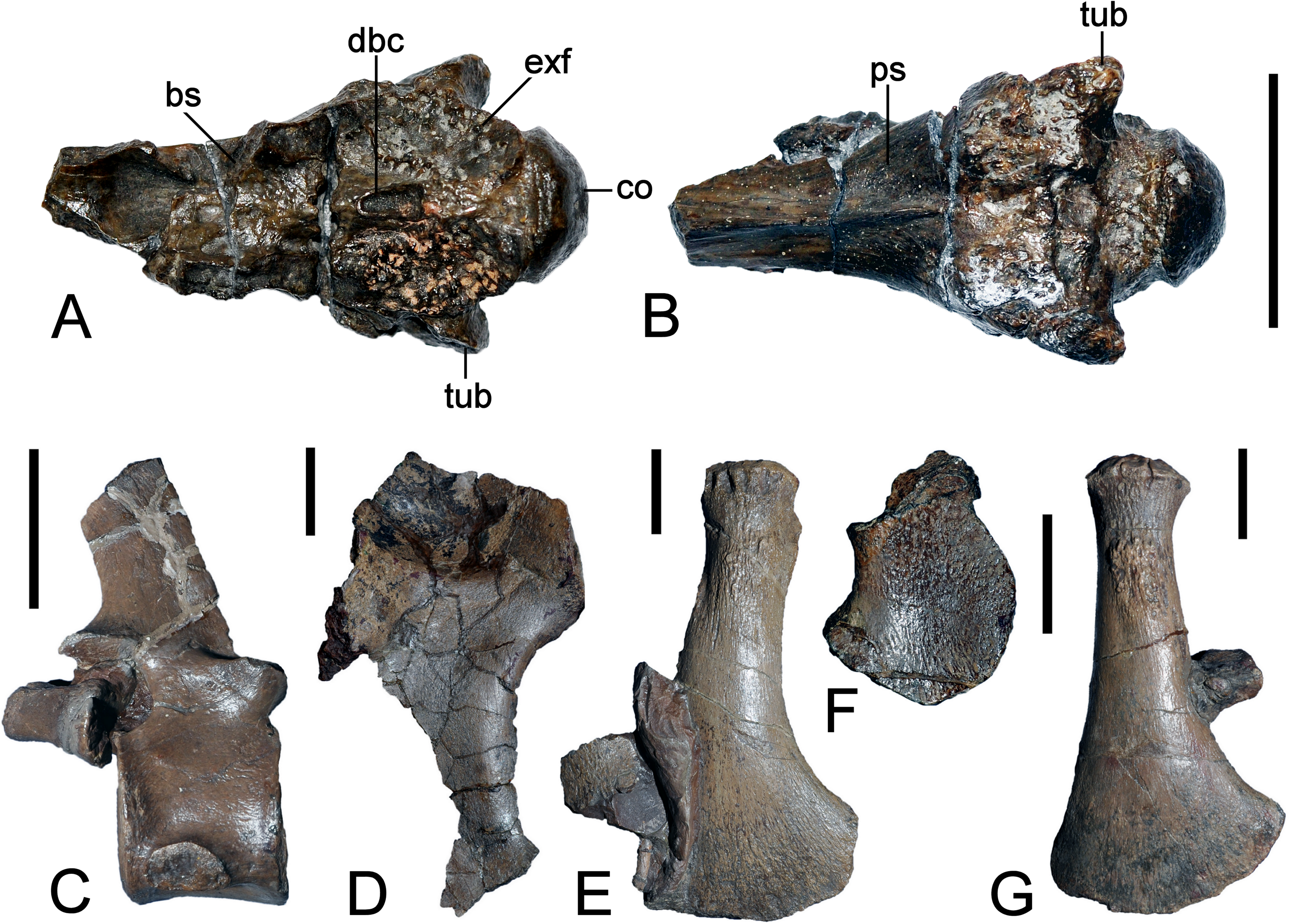
Basioccipital and basisphenoid-parasphenoid complex of the skull (A, B), cervical vertebra (C), left coracoid (D), right humerus (E), fibula (F), and right femur (G) of the holotype specimen of Gronausaurus (GPMM A3.B2).

Although the vast majority of the material, as well as the three species described by Koken, are now regarded as nomina dubia, Sachs et al. (2016) considered that most of these fossils show only minor differences from B. brancai. More specifically, they considered the holotype specimens of P. limnophilus and P. kanzleri, as well as the now-lost specimens assigned to P. valdensis and P. degenhardti in 1905, to be indistinguishable from B. brancai. They nevertheless emphasized that theses referrals, as well as the possible synonymy of P. limnophilus and P. kanzleri with B. brancai, cannot be confirmed with certainty due to the absence of a diagnostic combination of characters allowing an unambiguous identification. However, they considered that the original fossils of P. degenhardti from Obernkirchen represent a distinct taxon from B. brancai, due to the morphology of its cervical vertebrae . Sachs and colleagues also suggested that the English taxon Hastanectes valdensis, whose partial holotype skeleton is known from the Valanginian Wadhurst Clay Formation, is of uncertain generic distinction from Brancasaurus.

Two years after the initial discovery of the holotype of B. brancai, a second, more fragmentary skeleton was discovered in the same quarry, approximately 8 metres (26 ft) higher in the stratigraphic column. Since numbered as GPMM A3.B2, this specimen consists of teeth, parts of the jaws, the braincase and other fragmentary parts of the skull, vertebrae, pieces of ribs, part of the pectoral girdle, the entire pelvic girdle, one complete and one partial humerus, an ulna, two femora, a fibula, and various foot bones. Initially assigned to B. brancai in 1961, the specimen was designated by the German paleontologist Oliver Hampe as the holotype of a new genus and species, Gronausaurus wegneri, in a study published in 2013. Sachs et al. found that this specimen, which was mature, was virtually indistinguishable from the type of Brancasaurus with the exception of the length of the ischium, the height of the cervical neural spines, the width of the cervical centra, and whether the dorsal neural spines are constricted at their base. These minor differences can probably be attributed to either individual-based or age-based variation, supporting G. wegneri as a junior synonym of B. brancai.

== Description ==
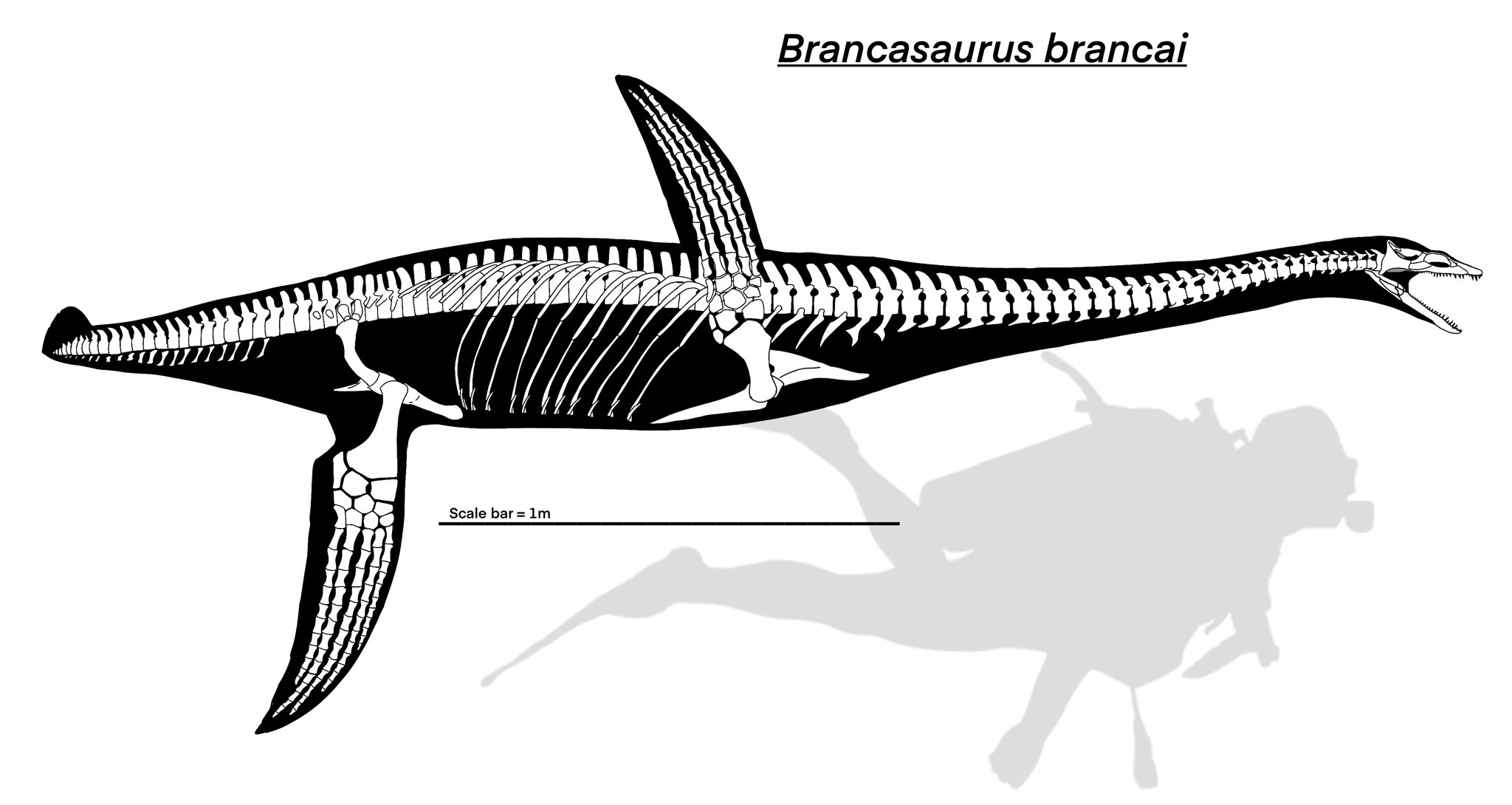
Size comparison

Brancasaurus was a medium-sized plesiosaur, with the holotype specimen measuring 3.26 metres (10.7 ft) in length; this specimen likely belongs to a subadult, judging by the unfused sutures in the vertebrae as well as the development of processes on the limbs and pubis.

=== Skull ===
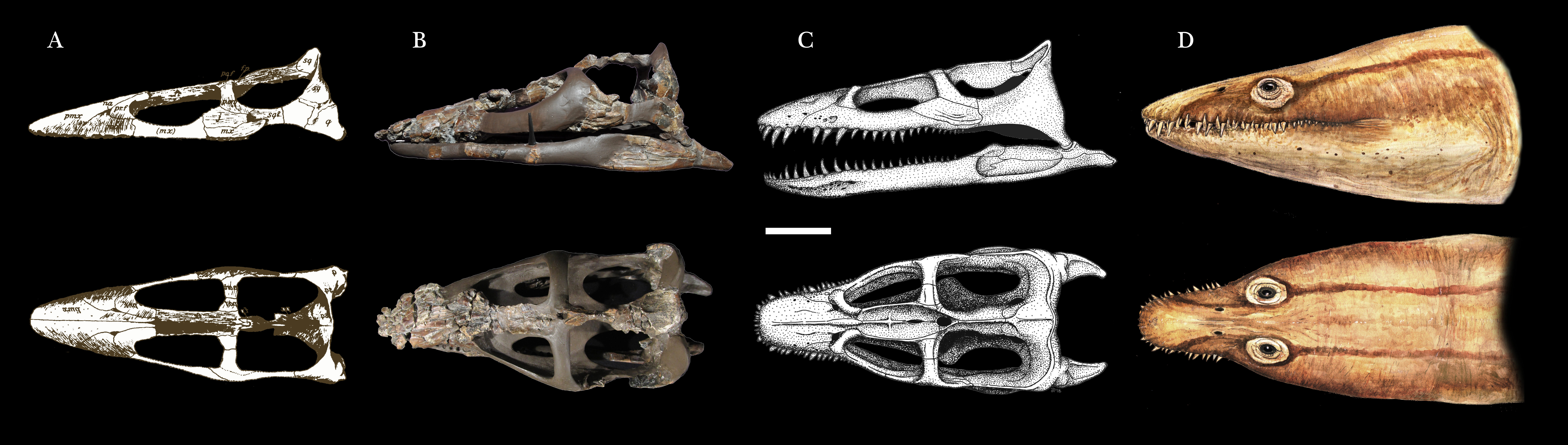
(a) The skull of Brancasaurus as interpreted by Wegner, (b) the present condition of the fossil material, (c) an interpretation of the skull after Sachs et al., (d) a life restoration.

The skull of the holotype, which measures 23.7 centimetres (9.3 in) long, is long and narrow, with a tapered snout that slopes downwards at an angle of 15°. The eye sockets were roughly the same size as the temporal openings immediately behind them. A narrow, rounded ridge along the middle of the top surface of the skull extends from near the front of the premaxilla to the back of the eye sockets. The frontal bones form a rectangular bar that separates the eye sockets down the middle. A ridge running across the bar intersects with the forward-extending ridge to produce a dagger-shaped protrusion. The jugal bone, which extends from the bottom of the eye socket back to the level of the temporal openings, is entirely bordered on its bottom by the maxilla. The squamosal bones arch around to form the curved back of the skull, and bear a ridge on top for attachment of neck muscles. There is also a ridge at the point where the two bones fuse. A cast of the braincase shows impressions of the semicircular canals and membranous inner ear, as well as canals of the hypoglossal, accessory, glossopharyngeal, and vagus nerves, which can also be observed on the bony exoccipital-opisthotic of the braincase. On the imperfectly-preserved lower jaw, the coronoid eminence seems to be relatively low, judging by the narrow and slightly curved top edge of the surangular bone. While the teeth have been lost, they were initially described as long, slender, and awl-shaped, with rough ridges on the outer surfaces. Although it has been suggested that Brancasaurus had very reduced tooth sockets in the premaxilla, as in Leptocleidus, this is impossible to verify because of damage to this portion of the skull.

=== Vertebral column ===
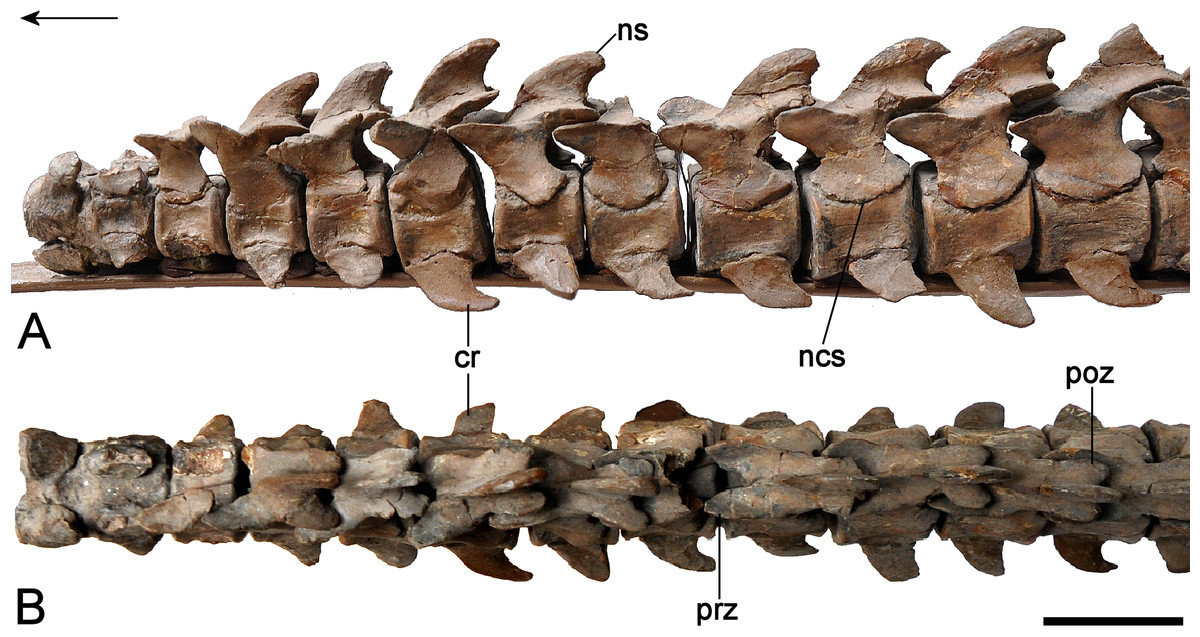
Cervical vertebrae in lateral (a) and dorsal (b) views, showing distinctive neural spines

The entire neck bears 37 cervical vertebrae, and is approximately 1.18 metres (3 ft 10 in) long. The centra of the vertebrae are wider than they are tall or long. Both ends of each vertebra are slightly concave, meaning that the vertebrae are amphicoelous. The sides of the vertebrae are likewise weakly concave; unlike many other long-necked plesiosaurs, they did not bear a ridge on the side (although this may be affected by age). The neural spines of the vertebrae are distinctively shaped like shark fins, being high and triangular. There are three pectoral vertebrae at the neck-body transition, which are weakly concave, taller than they are long, and have rectangular-shaped neural spines that are directed slightly backwards. The cervical and pectoral vertebrae have deep indentations through which the notochord passed.

The 19 dorsal vertebrae are similar to the pectoral vertebrae, being weakly concave and taller than long, but the neural spines are proportionally taller than the centra. The single-headed dorsal ribs are rounded but slightly flattened in cross-section, and some have a prong-like projection at the top end; their articular surfaces are slightly concave. Underneath, there are at least ten pairs of gastralia, each of which tapers to the sides and has a central groove on the bottom surface. The three sacral vertebrae are similar, but have much smaller, blunter, more oval-shaped ribs. The comparatively smaller first sacral rib is directed further outwards and backwards than the other two ribs. There initially were 25 caudal vertebrae preserved, with 22 still being accounted for. The last several caudal vertebrae are partially fused into a pygostyle-like structure. The preserved caudal ribs are flattened, triangular, and taper towards the tip of the tail.

=== Limbs and limb girdles ===
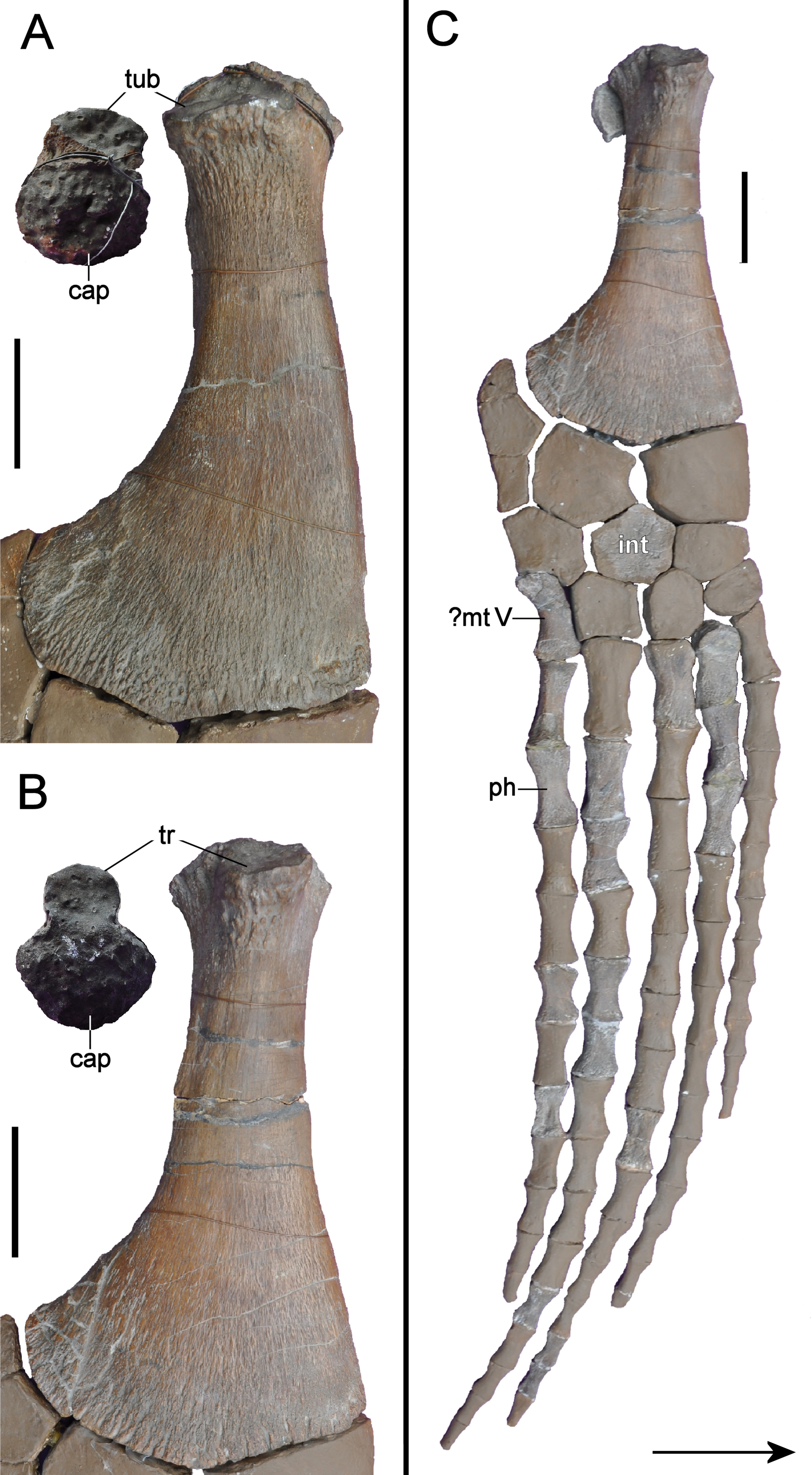
Limb elements: (a) humerus, (b) femur, (c) entire hindlimb

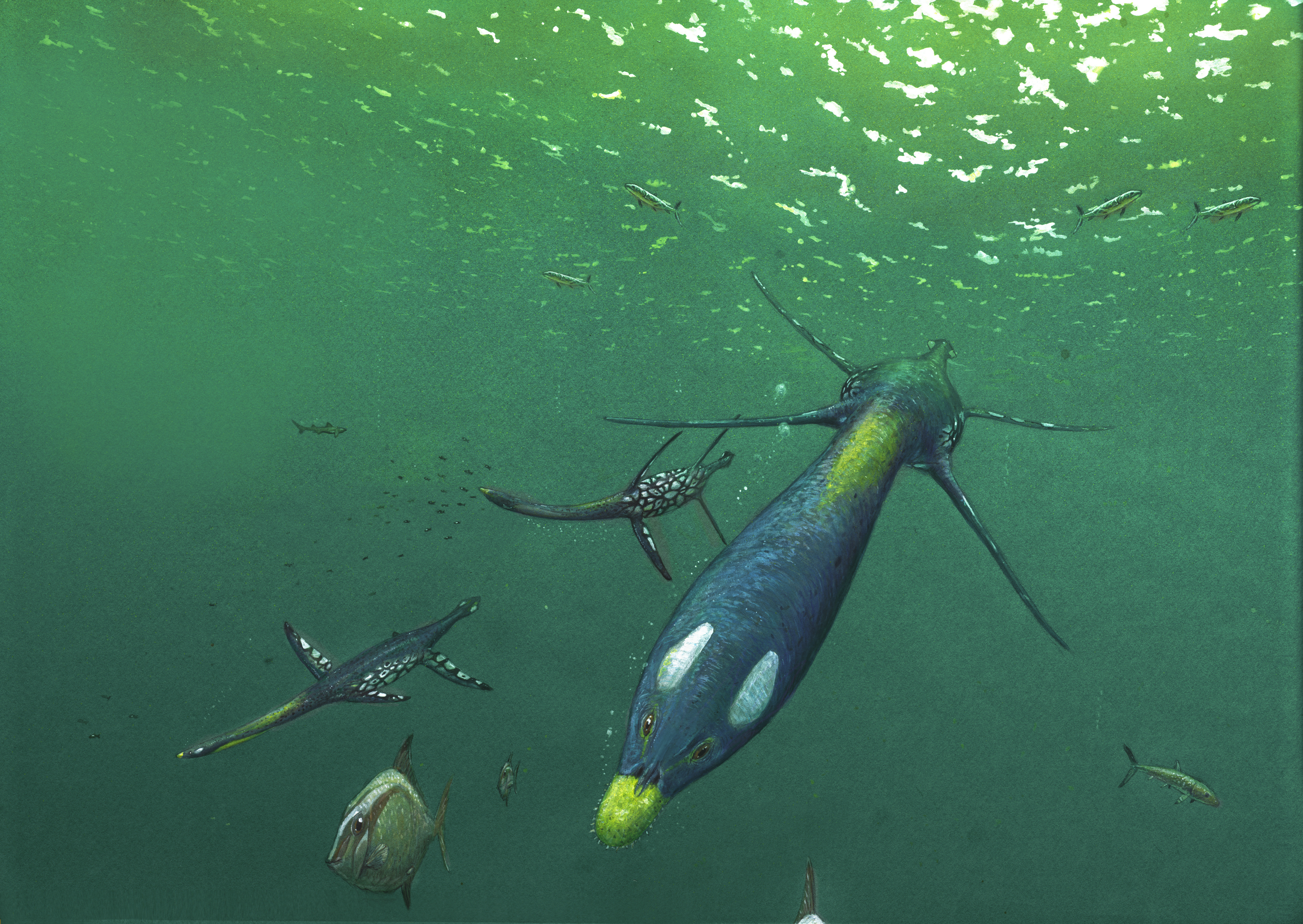
Brancasaurus in its natural habitat with pycnodontiform fish, with Caturus and Hybodus in the far background

The interclavicle is a large plate with a smooth upper surface and a prominent groove on the bottom surface. It also bears a small, pointed projection at its back end. The scapulae have prominent shelves on each side (diagnostic of leptocleidids and polycotylids, but not strongly differentiated in elasmosaurids), and their glenoids are clearly concave, with roughened attachments for cartilage. The two coracoids curve outwards in the middle and contact at their ends, forming a hole in the middle, although the exact morphology of this hole is uncertain. The regions where the coracoids contact is vaulted and thickened to form a weak, ridge-like projection, comparable to but probably convergently acquired from elasmosaurids. The pubes form a somewhat rectangular dish, with a convex front edge and concave outer edge, while the ischia are flat, triangular, and plate-like. The edges of the pubes where they meet the ischia curve inwards from the midline to each side. The corresponding edges of the ischia are similarly-shaped, with the curved edges of the bones collectively forming two rounded fenestrae that are connected in the center by a small rhombus-shaped opening, as also seen in Futabasaurus. The ilia are rod-shaped and bent, with blunt projections halfway along their outer rims; at the top end, they are flattened into a fan-like shape.

The humeri, which have a length of about 24 centimetres (9.4 in), are oval in cross-section, and about half as wide as they are long at the widest point. Their leading edges are curved in an S-shape, a trait also seen in Leptocleidus, Hastanectes, polycotylids, and the elasmosaurid Wapuskanectes, but not in Nichollssaura. The only femur that is presently available is 21.5 centimetres (8.5 in) long; it is concave on one edge, whereas the other edge is straight near the top but curves sharply near the bottom. The rest of the long bones of the limb have been lost. Allegedly, the radius was similar to but smaller and straighter than the tibia, and there was a hole present between the tibia and fibula. The 14 preserved phalanges, which likely include elements from both the forelimbs and the hindlimbs, are long and hourglass-shaped.

=== Possible soft tissue ===
Soft tissue was apparently preserved with the specimen, but was subsequently removed during preparation. Covering the limbs and the rest of the body was a layer of smooth, multilayered calcite, which was originally interpreted as preservation of decaying skin. Additionally, an accumulation of sediment in the abdominal region may have represented gut contents, with both gastroliths and digested bones. However, since both samples of the alleged soft tissue are no longer available, it is impossible to verify these interpretations.

== Classification ==
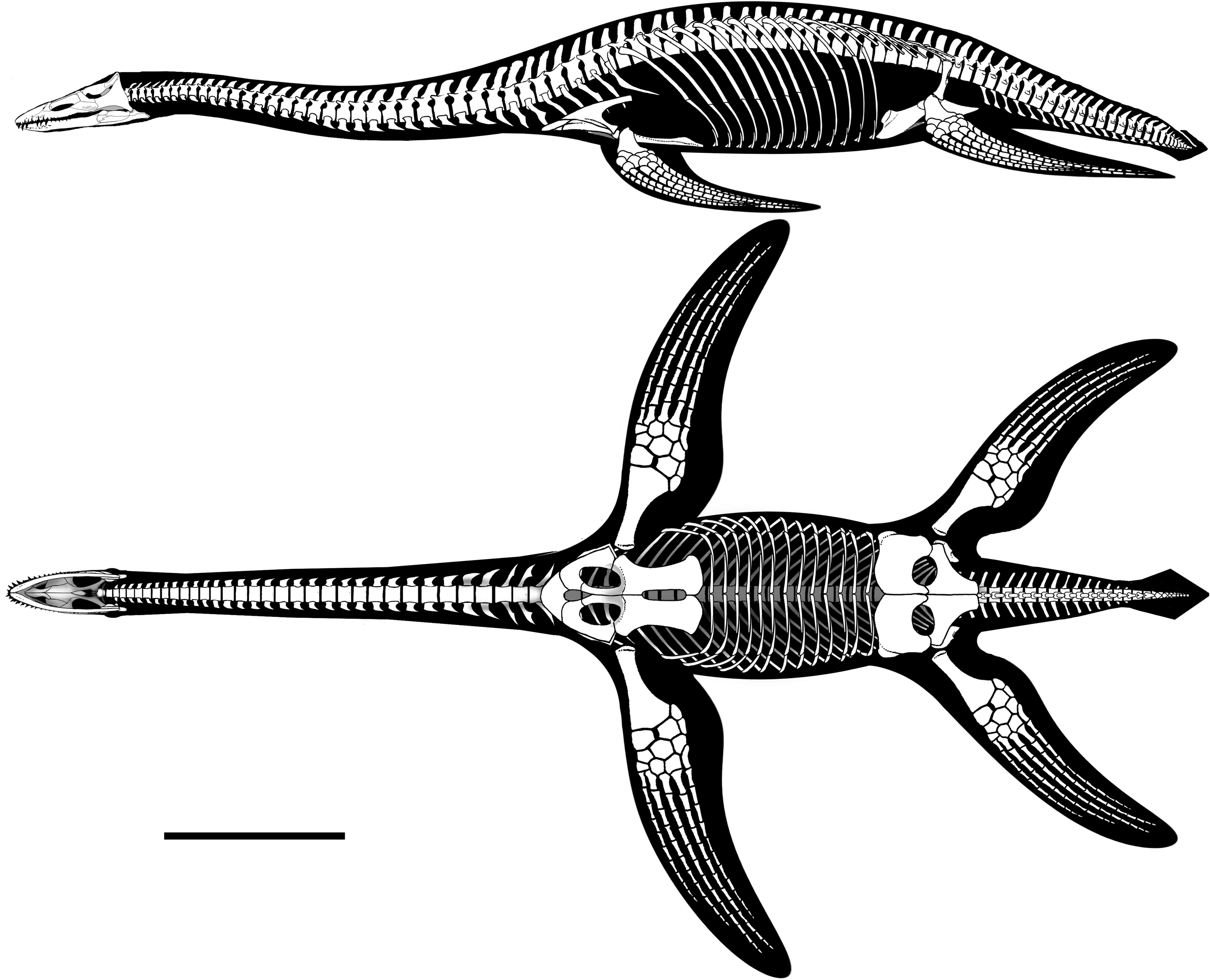
Skeletal reconstruction in lateral and ventral views

Initially, Brancasaurus was assigned to the Elasmosauridae by Wegner. He noted, however, that it had a shorter neck and a narrower head, as well as various distinctive morphologies of the skull roof, teeth, and vertebrae (especially the "shark fin"-shaped neural spines of the cervical vertebrae) compared to other members of the group known at the time. A number of subsequent studies have considered Brancasaurus as a basal member of the Elasmosauridae, with some even using Brancasaurus to define the clade. Nevertheless, a number of contrary taxonomic opinions have been expressed; in particular, Theodore E. White created a new family, Brancasauridae, to contain Brancasaurus, Seeleyosaurus, and "Thaumatosaurus", a defunct genus with species now belonging to Rhomaleosaurus and Meyerasaurus.

An alternative phylogenetic hypothesis that has gained substantial traction places Brancasaurus in the clade Leptocleididae since 2010, along with other leptocleidids including Leptocleidus itself, Vectocleidus, Umoonasaurus, Nichollssaura, and also possibly Hastanectes. This result has been recovered by the phylogenies of Benson et al., who have also noted a number of morphological traits which ally Brancasaurus with the more general Leptocleidia.

A 2016 phylogenetic analysis conducted by Sachs et al. found two equally strong alternative placements of Brancasaurus (including Gronausaurus): within the Leptocleididae; or as the sister taxon of a clade containing both Leptocleididae and Polycotylidae, with the clade containing all of the aforementioned taxa being the sister taxon of Elasmosauridae. The study concluded that, currently, no phylogenetic dataset is sufficient to resolve the relationships of Brancasaurus. In addition to the fact that the type specimen is a subadult, this inconsistency in results can be attributed to the mix of leptocleidid, polycotylid, and elasmosaurid characteristics that is seen in Brancasaurus. The cladograms below illustrate the alternate arrangements.

Topology A: Brancasaurus in the Leptocleididae, based on Benson et al. (2013)

- - Cryptoclididae
  - - - Edgarosaurus
      - Polycotylidae
    - Leptocleididae
      - - - Brancasaurus
          - Gronausaurus
        - - Leptocleidus capensis
          - Leptocleidus superstes
        - Vectocleidus
        - Umoonasaurus
      - Nichollssaura

Topology B: Brancasaurus outside Leptocleididae, based on Benson & Druckenmiller (2014)

- - Elasmosauridae
  - - - Brancasaurus
      - Gronausaurus
    - - - Leptocleididae
          - - Hastanectes
            - - Umoonasaurus
              - Vectocleidus
          - - Leptocleidus capensis
            - Leptocleidus superstes
          - Nichollssaura
        - Edgarosaurus
      - Polycotylidae

== Paleoecology ==
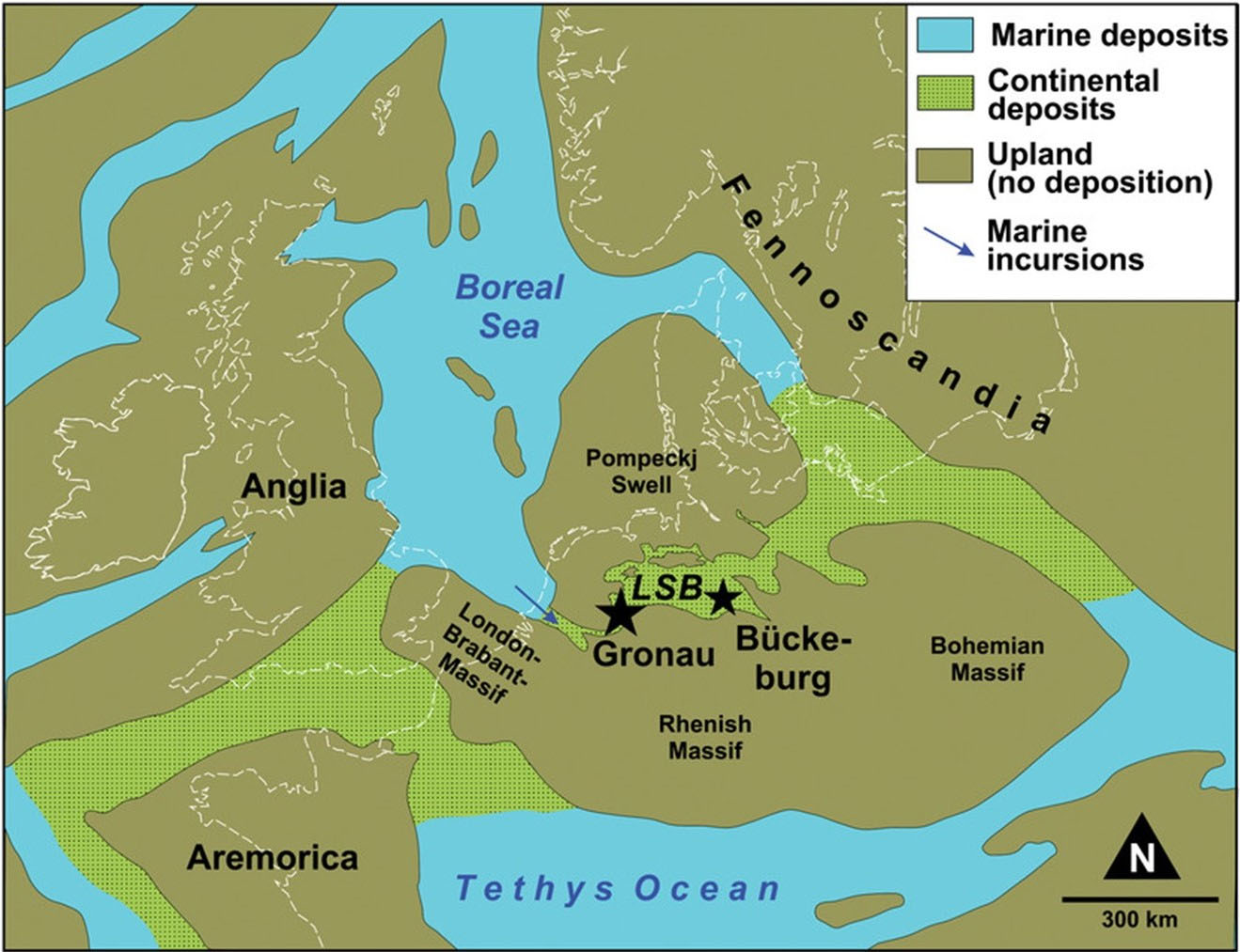
Map of Central Europe during the Berriasian; locations with Brancasaurus are marked with a star

The Bückeberg Group, from which Brancasaurus originates, likely represented a large, continental freshwater lake that the surrounding uplands drained into. In turn, the lake itself was temporarily connected to the Boreal Sea via a passage to the west. During the time at which the layers of "Wealden 5" and "Wealden 6" were deposited, the lake expanded and became more brackish as a result of marine transgression. The deposited sediments probably represent the oxygen-poor bottom portion of the lake, with the plesiosaurs of the Bückeberg Group being presumably preserved after they sank through the water column to the bottom.

Asides from Brancasaurus, other constituents of the Bückeberg Group are benthic invertebrates, including neomiodontid bivalves; hybodont sharks, including Hybodus, Egertonodus, Lonchidion, and Lissodus; the actinopterygian fish Caturus, Lepidotes, Coelodus, Ionoscopus, and Ainia, which Brancasaurus would have preyed on in surface waters; the turtle Desmemys; crocodilians, including Goniopholis, Pholidosaurus, and Theriosuchus; the theropod Altispinax; the marginocephalian Stenopelix; and an ankylosaur referred to Hylaeosaurus. Other indeterminate remains have been assigned to pterosaurs; the crocodilian clades Hylaeochampsidae and Eusuchia; and the dinosaurian clades Dryosauridae, Ankylopollexia, Troodontidae, and Macronaria. The presence of a large-bodied plesiosaur similar to the rhomaleosaurids or the pliosaurid Simolestes is also reported.

== See also ==
- Timeline of plesiosaur research
- List of plesiosaur genera
