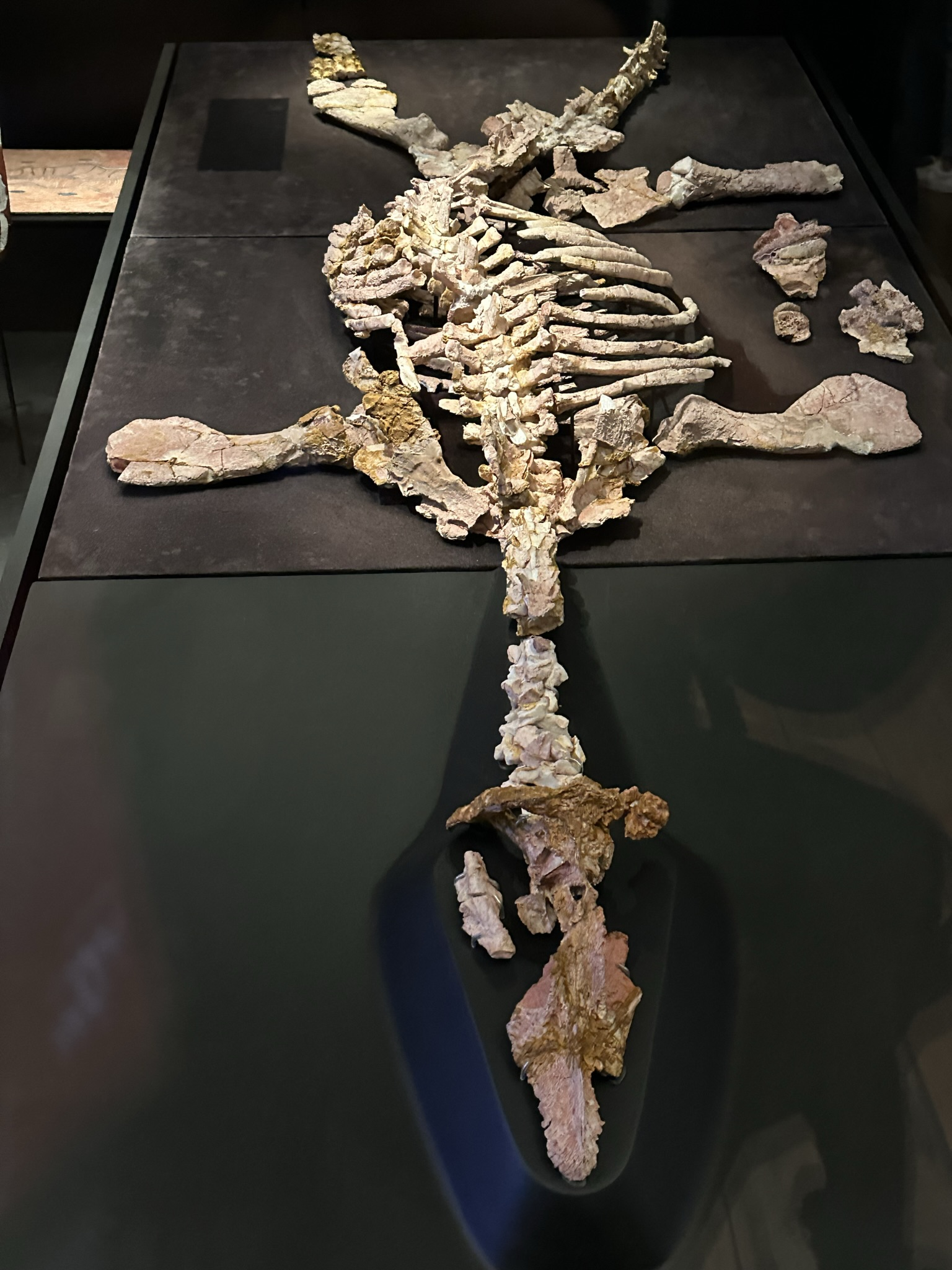
- Holotype specimen nicknamed "Eric" (AM F99374), on display at the Australian Museum

Scientific classification
- Kingdom: Animalia
- Phylum: Chordata
- Class: Reptilia
- Superorder: †Sauropterygia
- Order: †Plesiosauria
- Superfamily: †Plesiosauroidea
- Family: †Leptocleididae
- Genus: †Umoonasaurus; Kear, Schroeder & Lee, 2006
- Species: †U. demoscyllus

Binomial name
- †Umoonasaurus demoscyllus Kear, Schroeder & Lee, 2006

= Umoonasaurus =

Umoonasaurus Temporal range: Aptian-Albian, 115 Ma

Extinct species of reptile

Umoonasaurus is an extinct genus of plesiosaur belonging to the family Leptocleididae. This genus lived approximately 115 million years ago during the Early Cretaceous period (Aptian-Albian stages), in shallow seas covering parts of what is now Australia. It was a relatively small animal around 2.5 metres (8.2 ft) long. An identifying trait of Umoonasaurus is the presence of three crest-ridges on its skull.

== Discovery and naming ==
The holotype of Umoonasaurus demoscyllus is AM F99374 (nicknamed "Eric"), representing the most complete opalized fossil of a vertebrate known. Discovered by the local miners of the Zorba Extension Opal Field near the town of Coober Pedy, the chairman of the company Comrealty ("Mr. Sid Londish") bought the specimen in 1988, and later agreed to donate it to the Australian Museum where it was prepared during September of the same year. Other specimens have also been referred to this species. SAM P2381, discovered in the Andamooka opal fields, is another opalized specimen. SAM 31050 was discovered in the Curdimurka area near Lake Eyre, and SAM P410550, a juvenile specimen, comes from the Neales River region, near the town of Oodnadatta. Another juvenile specimen, SAM P15980, was later referred to this species. All known specimens come from the Bulldog Shale in South Australia, although material very similar to Umoonasaurus has been found in the Darwin Formation in the Northern Territory.

The generic name is a combination of the Antakirinja name for the Coober Pedy region, Umoona, and the Greek word sauros, meaning "lizard." The specific name comes from the Greek words demos and scylla, meaning "of the people" and "sea monster," respectively, referring to the public donations used to acquire the holotype.

== Description ==
Size comparison

Umoonasaurus is a small plesiosaur, a four-flippered marine reptile. The holotype is estimated to have measured 2–2.5 meters (6.6–8.2 ft) long, while the juvenile specimen SAM P15980 was only 70 centimetres (2.3 ft) long at maximum. Umoonasaurus is unusual in possessing a combination of primitive and derived characters.

Umoonasaurus had a small, triangular skull with a length of 22.2 centimeters (8.7 in) and a width of 13 centimeters (5.1 in). A tall, narrow crest is present along the middle of the anterior (front) end of the skull. Two other ridges are present above the orbits (openings for the eyes). The premaxilla bears a dental rosette with five tooth sockets. These would have held long, sharp teeth. Each maxilla bears at least ten tooth sockets. The teeth in positions 4 to 6 would have been very large, while the rest of the teeth would have been smaller and more gracile. The external nares (openings for the nostrils) are very small and positioned close to the orbits. While incompletely preserved, the temporal fenestrae would have likely occupied one third of the length of the skull. The anterior skull roof (composed of the parietals) is lanceolate (shaped like a lance head). The pineal foramen (a depression between the orbits and the temporal fenestrae) is triangular and has raised edges. The vomer (a palatal bone close to the tip of the snout) barely extends posteriorly past the internal nares (opening for the nostrils on the inside of the skull). The region of the pterygoid (another of the palatal bones) that borders the quadrate is squared off. The interpterygoid vacuity (a region enclosed by the left and right pterygoids) is separated into the anterior and posterior interpterygoid vacuities, the former of which is particularly large. The parasphenoid (one of the bones in the braincase) runs over the midline of the narrower posterior interpterygoid vacuity. The surrounding surface of the pterygoid is concave. The basicranium (braincase floor) has gracile paroccipital processes (extensions that connect to other bones in the skull). The basioccipital has robust protuberances and extends behind the pterygoid.

The postcranium of Umoonasaurus is not very specialized, but does have some derived traits. The cervical (neck) centra (vertebral bodies) are taller than wide, and the width of the zygapophyses (projections on the neural arch involved in vertebral articulation) is roughly equal to that of the centrum. The neural spines are laterally (side to side) compressed and blade-like in shape. The ribs are single-headed. The epipodials (the bones that form the forearm and shin) are wider than long. At least five posterior caudal vertebrae are fused into a structure that resembles a pygostyle. The function of this structure is unclear, but it may have been involved in the support of a dermal caudal fin.

== Classification ==
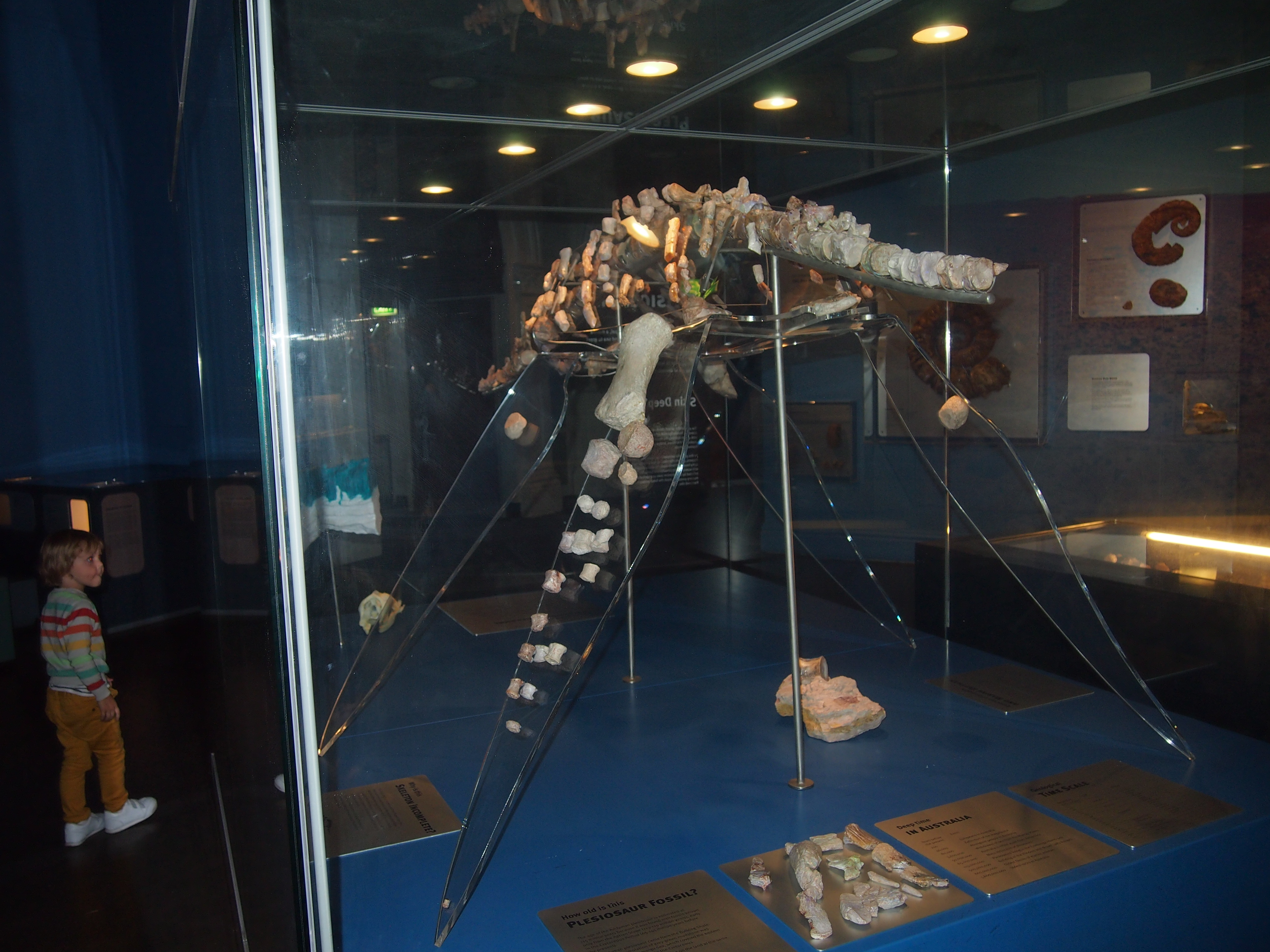
The Addyman plesiosaur, an opalised specimen that may belong to this genus

Prior to their description, the specimens that would later be assigned to Umoonasaurus were thought to represent a new species of Leptocleidus. In 2006, Kear and colleagues found Umoonasaurus to belong to the superfamily Pliosauroidea and be the most basal member of the family Rhomaleosauridae. They found the latter surprising, as Umoonasaurus was also identified as the last surviving member of that family. Leptocleidus was recovered as a more derived rhomaleosaurid, although it was still considered plausible that the two might be close relatives. In 2008, Smith and Dyke found Umoonasaurus to belong to Leptocleididae instead of Rhomaleosauridae, although still within Pliosauroidea. A 2009 study by Druckenmiller and Russel also recovered Umoonasaurus as a pliosauroid, this time as a possible member of Polycotylidae. In 2010, Ketchum and Benson found Umoonasaurus to be a member of Leptocleididae, although they recovered that family as a member of Plesiosauroidea instead of Pliosauroidea. Umoonasaurus was also recovered as a leptocleidid by Druckenmiller and Knutsen in 2012, who found Leptocleididae to belong to Pliosauroidea once again. A 2013 study by Benson and colleagues found Umoonasaurus to be a close relative of Leptocleidus and to belong to Leptocleidia within Plesiosauroidea. In 2015, Parrilla-Bel and Canudo found Umoonasaurus to be a leptocleidid, and in turn finding Leptocleididae to belong to Leptocleidia, which was once again recovered as a member of Plesiosauroidea. Subsequent analyses have recovered a placement for Umoonasaurus similar to the previous two studies.

Topology recovered by Druckenmiller and Russell (2009)

- - Pliosauridae
  - - - Leptocleidus superstes
      - Leptocleidus capensis
    - Polycotylidae
      - Umoonasaurus demoscyllus
      - - QM F18041
        - - - TMP 95.87.01
            - Polycotylus latipinnis
            - Nichollssaura borealis
          - - Edgarosaurus muddi
            - Dolichorhynchops osborni

Topology of Leptocleidia recovered by Parrilla-Bel and Canudo (2015)

- - - Plesiopleurodon
    - Edgarosaurus
  - - - Leptocleidus
      - Nichollssaura
      - Umoonasaurus
    - - Vectocleidus
      - - Hastanectes
        - Brancasaurus

== Paleobiology ==
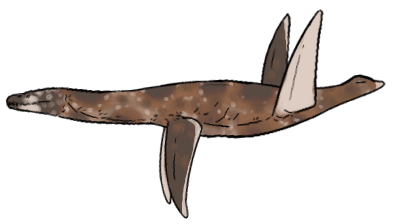
Life restoration

The crests of Umoonasaurus were likely covered by keratin in life, which would have made the crests considerably taller. Since the crests seem too delicate for defense, intraspecific combat, or skull reinforcement, they likely were used for communication. These structures could have been used for both species recognition and courtship displays, and may have been boldly colored in life. Preserved gut contents of the type specimen include 60 gastroliths and 17 isolated vertebrae of an indeterminate teleost fish. This teleost would have an estimated maximum length of between 182 and 296 mm, suggesting Umoonasaurus was a pelagic predator of the middle trophic level, but does not rule out opportunistic predation on benthic prey. This indicates a preference for small prey items, a view reinforced by the lack of hypercarnivorous adaptations in Umoonasaurus.

== Paleoenvironment ==
All known Umoonasaurus come from the Bulldog Shale, a member of the Marree Subgroup located in the Eromanga Basin of South Australia. The sediments of the Bulldog Shale were deposited from the early Aptian to early Albian stages of the Lower Cretaceous, with Umoonasaurus coming from Aptian deposits laid down approximately 115 million years ago. Some horizons of the Bulldog Shale, including those around Coober Pedy, contain rich opal deposits. Fossilized macroinvertebrates and pollen have been used to recover an early Aptian to early Albian age for this formation. The deposits of the Bulldog Shale represent a coastal region of a shallow epicontinental sea. Dark layers of shale rich in organic material with low planktonic diversity are indictive of dysaerobic waters (those with a low amount of dissolved oxygen) near the bottom. This sea would have been located at a latitude of approximately 70° S, within the polar regions. The presence of glendonite, ice-rafted boulders, and coniferous driftwood with dense growth rings indicate a seasonal climate with near-freezing temperatures. The average temperature of this region has been estimated at 12.2 °C (54.0 °F). This suggests that Umoonasaurus was able to tolerate these cold conditions.

The Bulldog Shale has yielded fossils of plants, invertebrates, fish, and reptiles. The macroinvertebrate fauna of this formation includes several molluscs, such as belemnites, gastropods, and bivalves. Fish are represented by chimaeras (such as Edaphodon) and bony fish (including teleosts and a lungfish). Sharks are conspicuously absent in the Bulldog Shale. Among the reptiles are other plesiosaurs, including the possible aristonectine elasmosaurid Opallionectes, other indeterminate elasmosaurids, the giant pliosaurid Kronosaurus, and polycotylid-like specimens. The ichthyosaur Platypterigius is also known from the Bulldog Shale.

== See also ==
- List of plesiosaur genera
- Timeline of plesiosaur research
