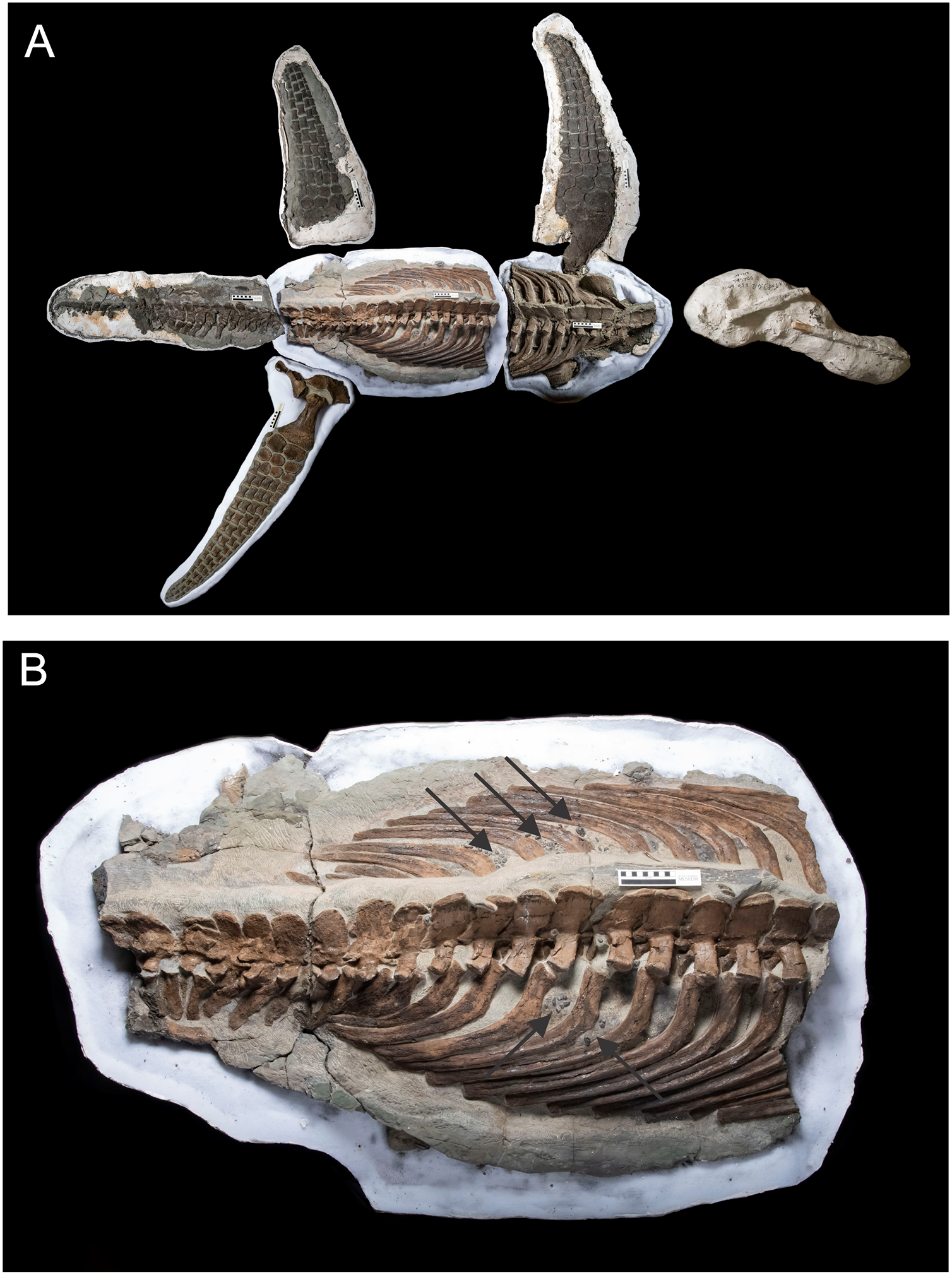
- Specimen TMP2012.50.1 with gastroliths

Scientific classification
- Kingdom: Animalia
- Phylum: Chordata
- Class: Reptilia
- Superorder: †Sauropterygia
- Order: †Plesiosauria
- Superfamily: †Plesiosauroidea
- Family: †Elasmosauridae
- Genus: †Wapuskanectes; Druckenmiller & Russell, 2006
- Species: †W. betsynichollsae

Binomial name
- †Wapuskanectes betsynichollsae Druckenmiller & Russell, 2006

= Wapuskanectes =

Wapuskanectes Temporal range: Early Cretaceous, 112 Ma

Extinct genus of reptiles

Wapuskanectes is an extinct genus of early elasmosaurid known from Alberta, Canada, in the Albian aged Wabiskaw member of the Clearwater Formation.

Wapuskanectes is the oldest North American elasmosaurid to date, at around 112 million years old.

== Etymology ==
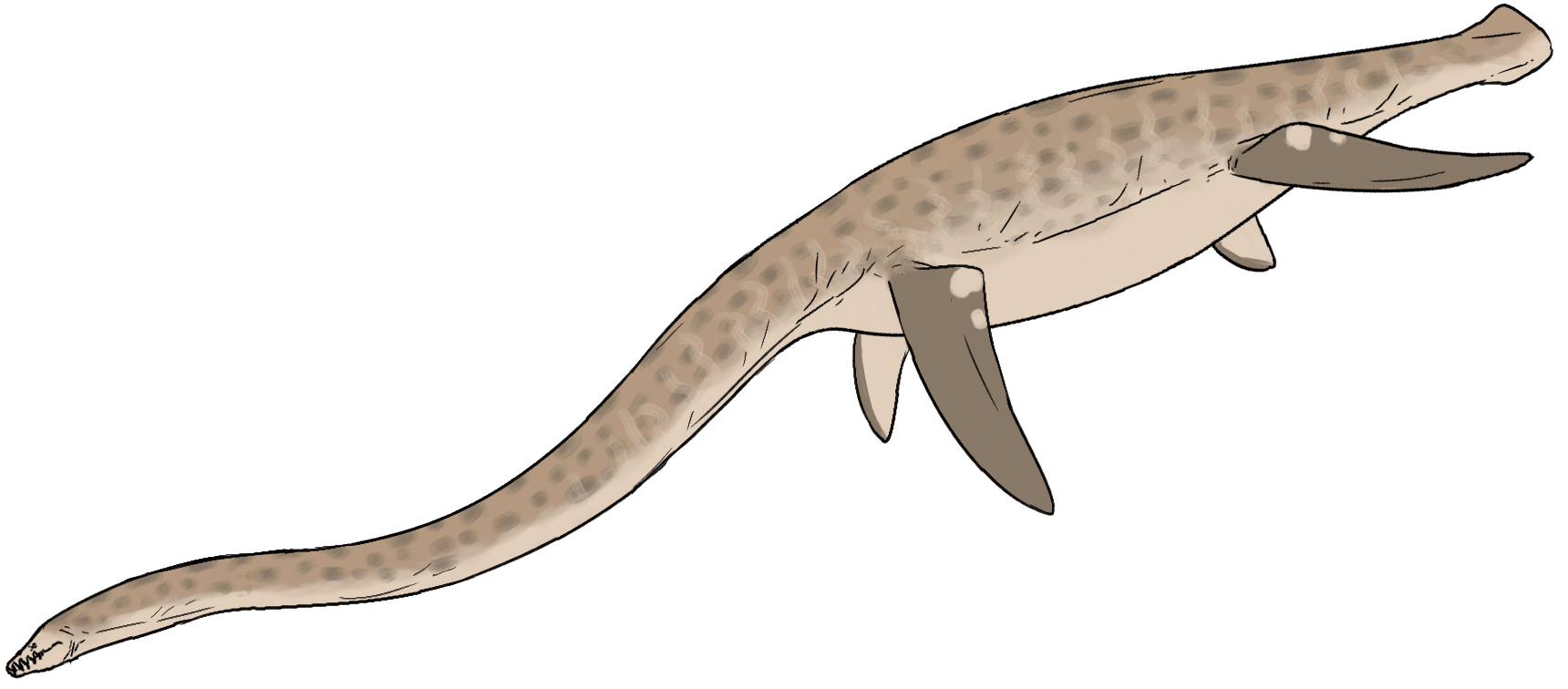
Life restoration

The generic name is derived from Wapuska, Cree language for "a body of water with whitecaps on it" and also it is the etymology of the Wabiskaw Member, in which the holotype was found, and nectes, Greek for "swimmer". The specific name honors the late Dr. Elizabeth "Betsy" Nicholls, curator of marine reptiles at the Royal Tyrrell Museum of Palaeontology, for enduring influence on research in Mesozoic marine vertebrates.

== Discovery ==
Wapuskanectes was named by Patrick S. Druckenmiller and Anthony P. Russell in 2006. The type species and only species is Wapuskanectes betsynichollsae.

The holotype is TMP 98.49.02, an articulated partial postcranial skeleton including an almost complete pectoral girdle. It was collected in the western side of the Syncrude Canada Ltd.'s open-pit oilsand mine (Syncrude Base Mine) near Ft. McMurray, from the Wabiskaw Member of the Clearwater Formation, dating to the earliest Albian stage of the Early Cretaceous, about 112 million years ago. This is the same rock unit that produced the leptocleidid Nichollsaura.

Several specimens have been discovered, the most complete of which is TMP 2012.50.1, found 30 km away from the Syncrude mine where previous specimens were found. It was discovered when a grader ploughed through the neck, resulting in the destruction of the skull and most of the neck. Additionally, there was no trace of the right forelimb, although this loss is interpreted to have occurred some time prior to the final burial of the animal in the early Cretaceous.

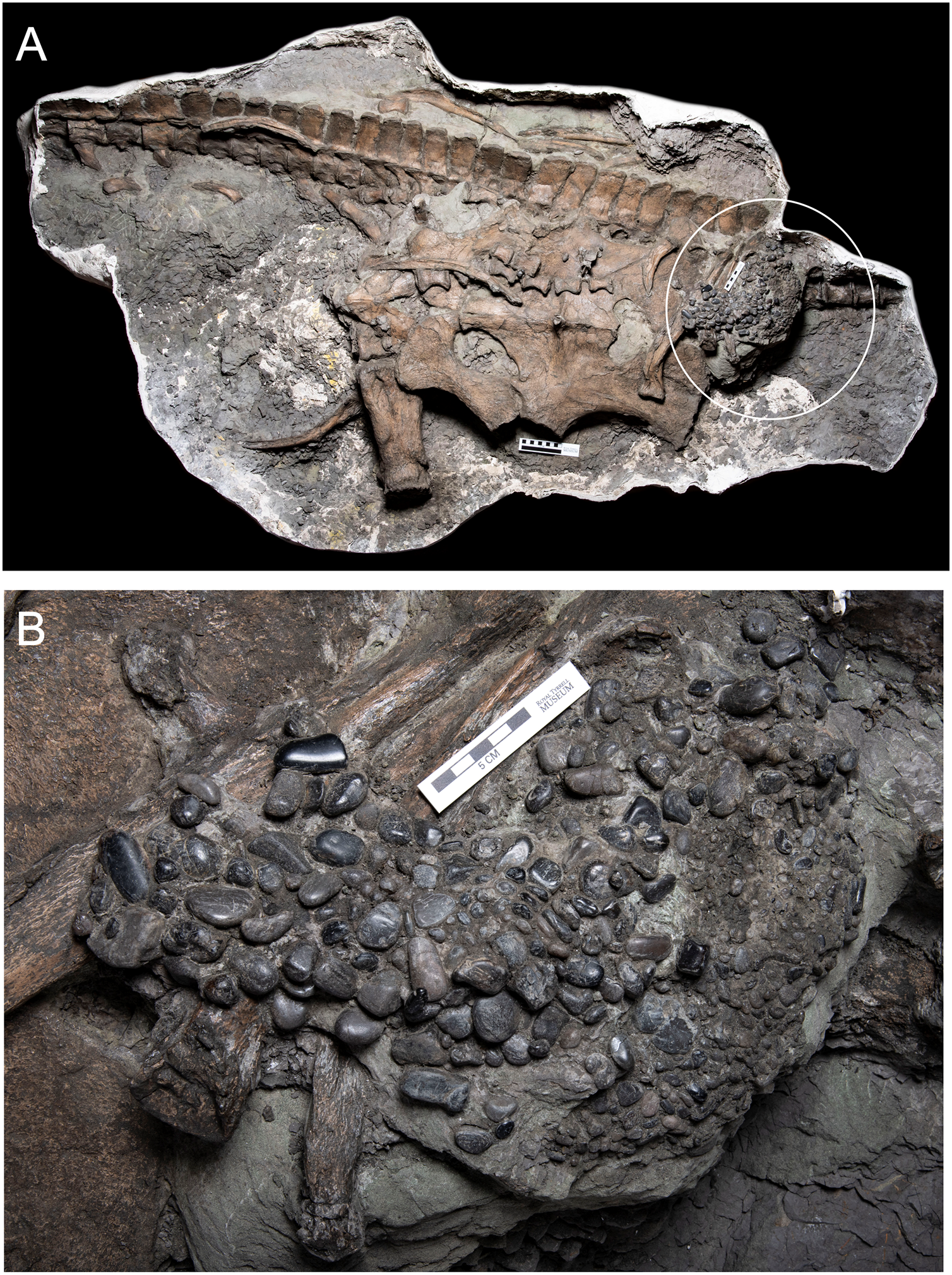
Gastroliths in TMP 2011.88.1

=== Gastroliths ===
Two potential specimens which were identified as cf. Wapuskanectes, TMP 2011.88.1 and TMP 2012.50.1, preserve gastroliths. The former's gastroliths were primarily composed of black, polished chert pebbles with some minor quartzites, and the latter's were likely the same, although only a few of its gastroliths were visible, the largest of which weighed 14.5 grams.

Gastroliths in TMP 2012.50.1 could be seen poking out of the dorsal side of the body between the ribs, as after death it had come to rest on the seabed on its back.

Gastroliths were primarily spherical pebbles. Similar gastrolith composition is seen in the leptocleidid Nichollsaura from the same unit, despite Wapuskanectes having 10 times more mass than Nichollsaura. The former did have larger gastroliths and an estimated 5 times the weight in gastroliths however.

The gastroliths in both genera were found to have similar composition to the early Aptian aged conglomerate rocks in the Cadomin Formation, suggesting that the two genera collected stones from the same geographic area. These rocks are 8–10 million years older than the Wabiskaw member plesiosaurs, so it is hypothesized that they may have swum westward from the northern Western Interior Seaway to collect the Cadomin rocks eroding out of the beaches and river mouths of the Seaway's western coast.
