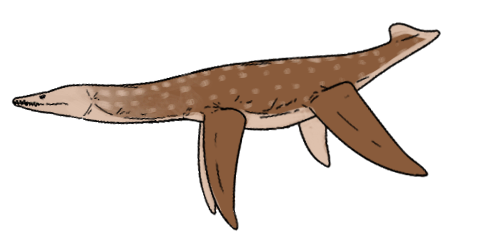
- Life restoration of L. capensis

Scientific classification
- Kingdom: Animalia
- Phylum: Chordata
- Class: Reptilia
- Superorder: †Sauropterygia
- Order: †Plesiosauria
- Superfamily: †Plesiosauroidea
- Family: †Leptocleididae
- Genus: †Leptocleidus; Andrews, 1922

Species
- †L. capensis (Andrews, 1911 [originally Plesiosaurus capensis]) Cruikshank, 1997; †L. clemai Cruikshank and Long, 1997; †L. superstes Andrews, 1922 (type)

Synonyms
- Peyerus capensis (Andrews, 1911) Stromer, 1935

= Leptocleidus =

Leptocleidus Temporal range: Early Cretaceous, 135–125 Ma

Extinct genus of reptiles

Leptocleidus is an extinct genus of plesiosaur belonging to the family Leptocleididae. It was comparatively small in size, measuring only up to 3 m (9.8 ft) in length.

== Discovery ==
L. superstes Andrews, 1922

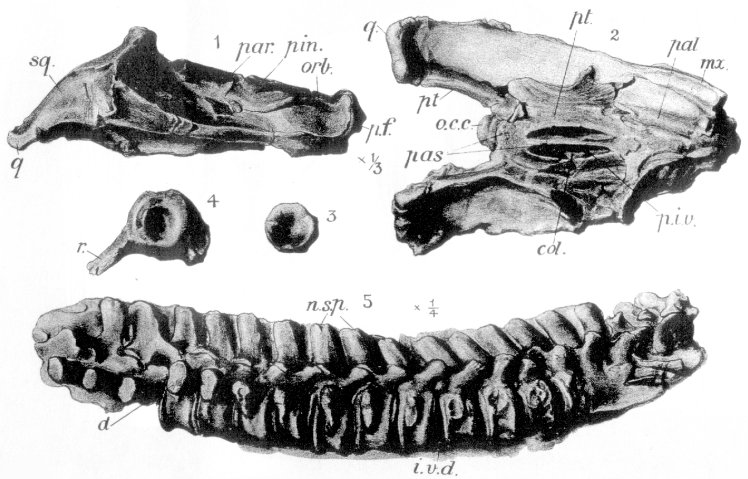
Cranium (lateral view, top left; ventral (palatal) view, top right) and vertebrae. Length of vertebral series approx. 45 cm

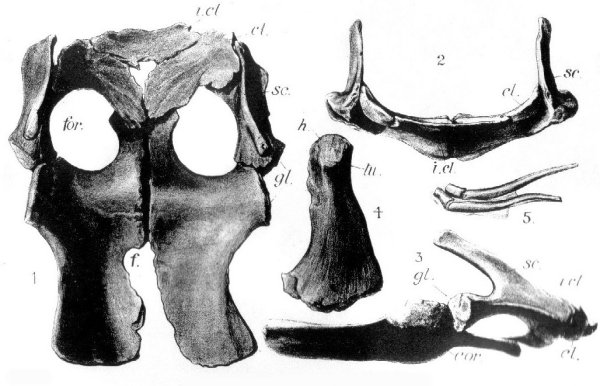
Pectoral girdle in dorsal view (left), anterior view (top right), lateral view (bottom right), right humerus (center), and ribs (left). Length of pectoral girdle approx. 40 cm

In short, the term Leptocleidus means "slender clavicle". It comes from a merge of the Greek words λεπτοσ, meaning "slender" and κλειδ (also spelled κλεισ) meaning clavicle.

Leptocleidus is known from the following sediments:

- L. capensis is known from the Sundays River Formation (upper Valanginian age), Cape Province, South Africa.
- L. clemai from the Birdrong Sandstone, found near Kalbarri in the Carnarvon Basin (Hauterivian-Barremian age) Western Australia.
- L. superstes is known from the Upper Weald Clay (Barremian age), Sussex, England.

A specimen from the Vectis Formation (lower Aptian age), Isle of Wight, found in 1995 and seen as a "Leptocleidus sp.", was named as a separate genus Vectocleidus in 2012.

== Description ==
With large clavicles and interclavicle and small scapulae, Leptocleidus resembled the Early Jurassic Rhomaleosaurus and members of the Cretaceous family, Polycotylidae. The animal had 21 teeth on either side of its maxilla and approximately 35 teeth on each side of the mandible. The Leptocleidus' triangle-shaped skull had a crest running from a ridge on the end of the nose to the nasal region. Differing from pliosaurids, Leptocleidus had single-headed cervical ribs and a deep depression in the centra of the neck vertebrae.

Leptocleidus, unlike many plesiosaurs, lived in shallow lagoons and likely visited brackish and fresh water systems (such as the mouths of large rivers). This led Arthur Richard Ivor Cruickshank to infer that this movement to fresh water was an attempt to flee larger plesiosaurs and pliosaurs. Most species are known from The British Isles but L. capensis was discovered in Cape Province, South Africa.

== Classification ==
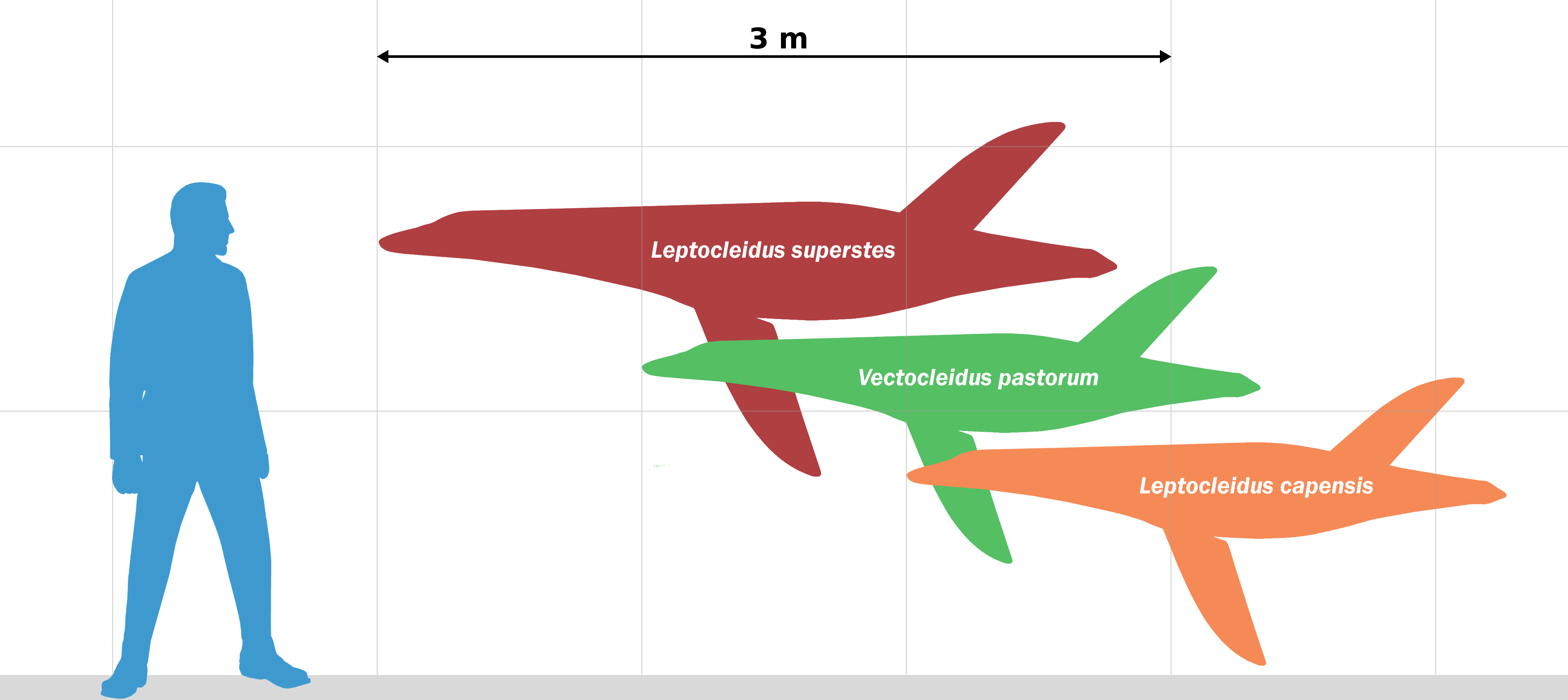
Size of two species, along with Vectocleidus (green at the center), compared to a human

Cladogram based on Ketchum and Benson (2011):

- Leptocleididae
  - Nichollssaura
  - - Brancasaurus
    - - Umoonasaurus
      - Leptocleidus
        - L. capensis
        - L. superstes

== See also ==
- List of plesiosaur genera
- Timeline of plesiosaur research
