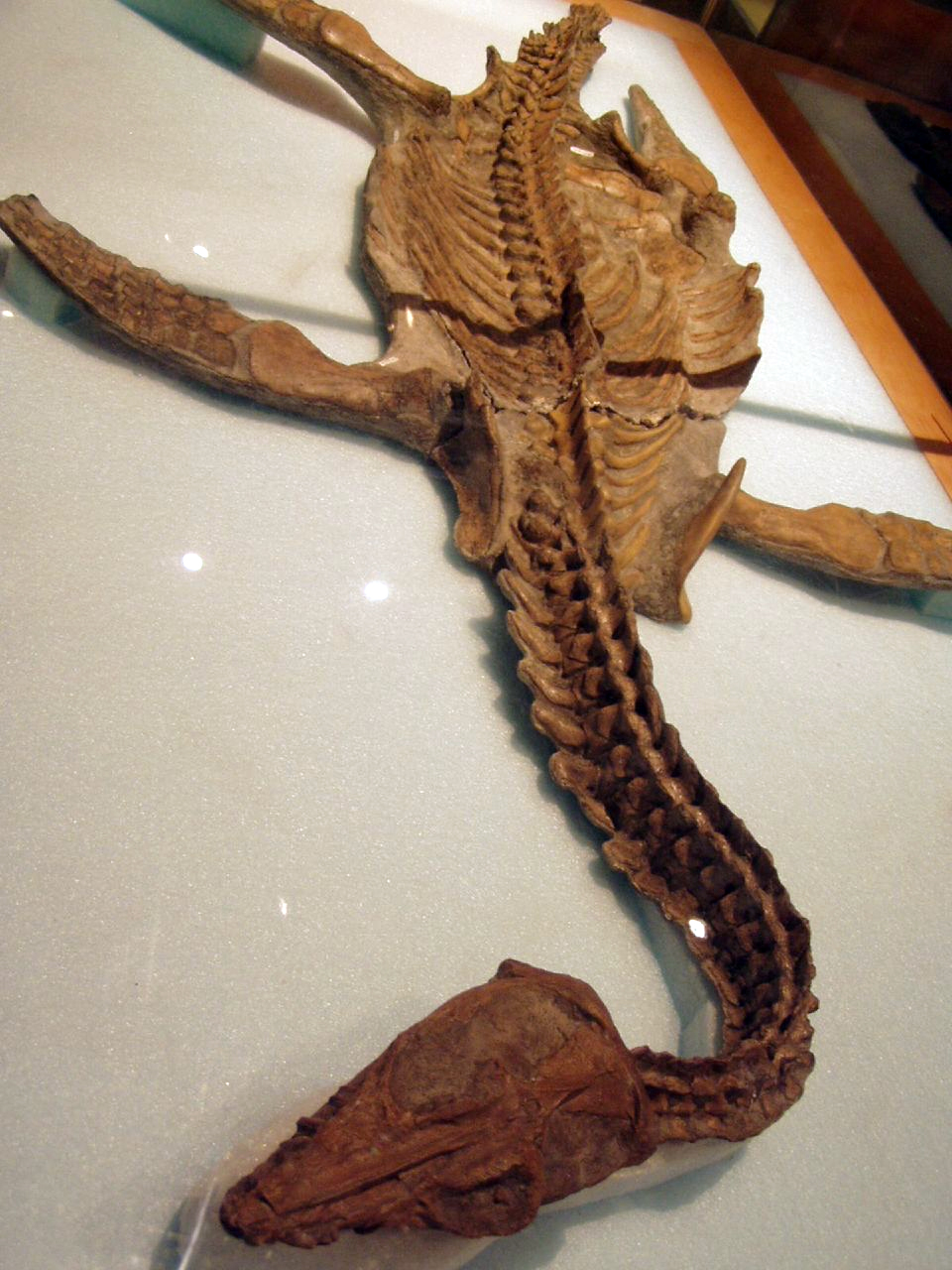
- Holotype specimen at the Royal Tyrrell Museum

Scientific classification
- Kingdom: Animalia
- Phylum: Chordata
- Class: Reptilia
- Superorder: †Sauropterygia
- Order: †Plesiosauria
- Superfamily: †Plesiosauroidea
- Clade: †Leptocleidia
- Family: †Leptocleididae
- Genus: †Nichollssaura; Druckenmiller & Russell, 2009
- Species: †N. borealis

Binomial name
- †Nichollssaura borealis (Druckenmiller & Russell, 2008 [originally Nichollsia, preoccupied])

Synonyms
- Nichollsia borealis Druckenmiller & Russell, 2008

= Nichollssaura =

Nichollssaura Temporal range: Early Cretaceous, 110 Ma

Extinct genus of reptiles

Nichollssaura is an extinct genus of leptocleidid plesiosaur from the Early Cretaceous Boreal Sea of North America. The type species is N. borealis, found in the early Albian age Clearwater Formation near Fort McMurray, Alberta, Canada.

== Taxonomy ==
The fossil, named after paleontological curator Dr. Betsy Nicholls, originally was named Nichollsia borealis but Nichollsia was already in use (preoccupied) by a genus of isopods. Thus, the original authors proposed Nichollssaura as a replacement generic name in 2009.

== Description ==
Nichollssaura was a small plesiosaur, estimated up to 2.6–2.9 m (8.5–9.5 ft) in length and 135 kg (298 lb) in body mass based on a complete specimen (TMP 1994.122.1). It fills an approximate 40-million-year gap in the fossil record of North American plesiosaurs.

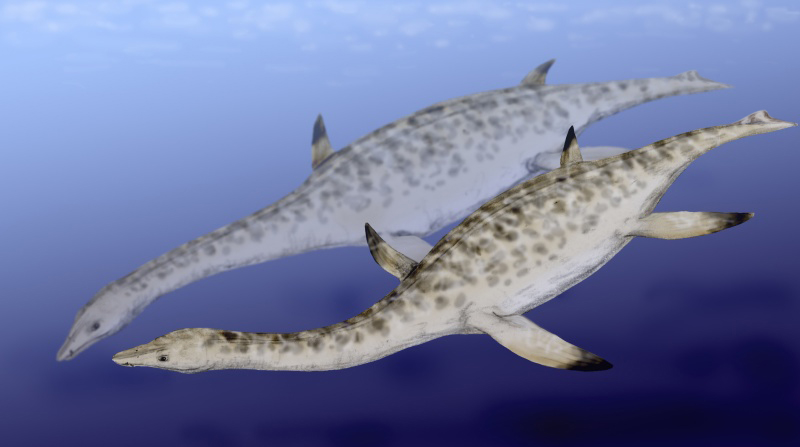
Life restoration of two individuals

The type specimen was discovered in one of Syncrude Canada Ltd.'s open-pit oilsand mines near Fort McMurray, Alberta, in 1994, in the Wabiskaw member of the Clearwater Formation. The fossil is on display at the Royal Tyrrell Museum of Palaeontology. It was discovered in the same unit that produced the elasmosaurid Wapuskanectes.

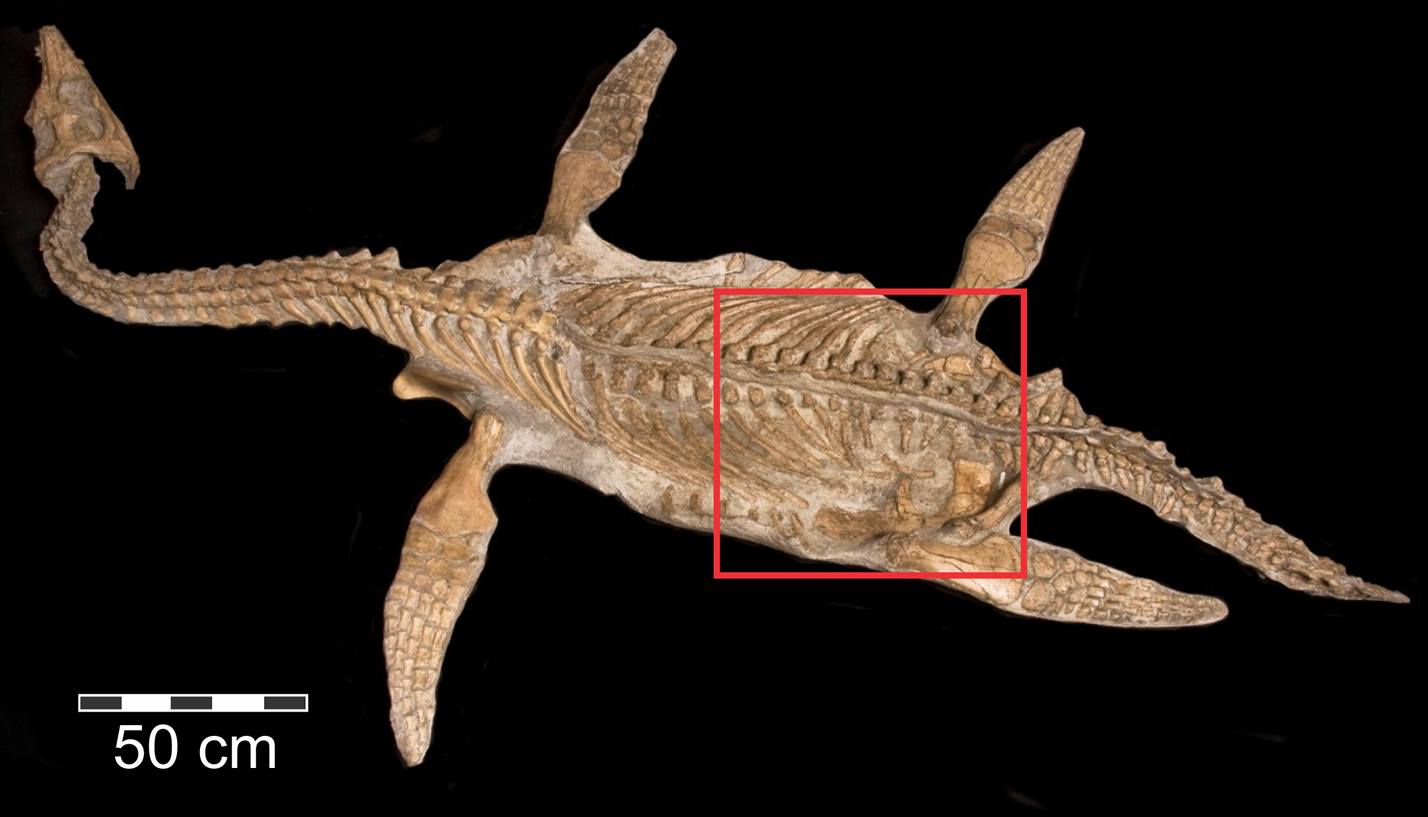
Holotype. Region with gastroliths in red (not visible).

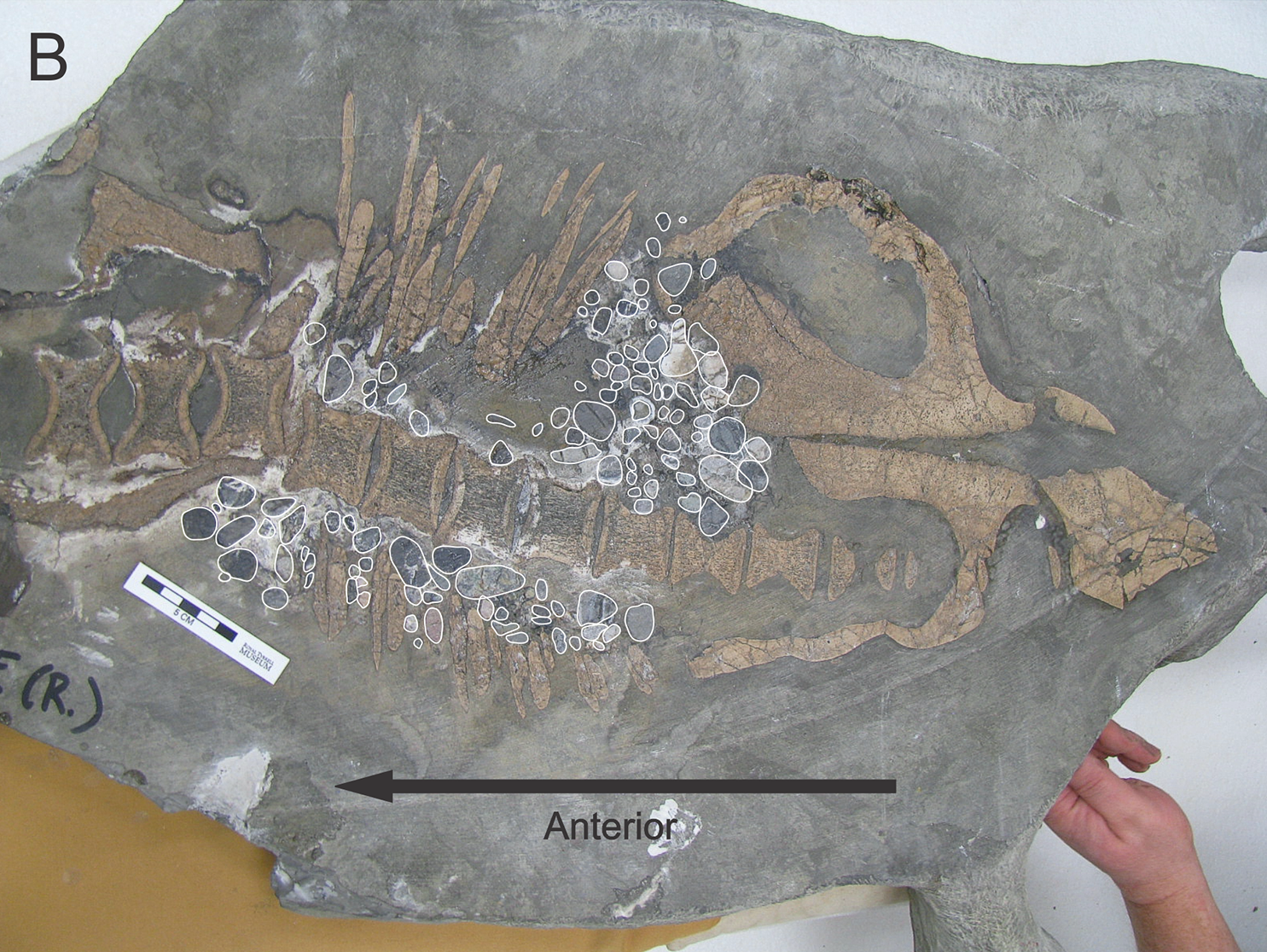
Gastroliths

Most of the skeleton is preserved, missing only the left forelimb and scapula, the bones distal to the ankle on the right hindlimb, and the proximal third of the cervical ribs on the left side, and the first few anterior dorsal ribs, also on the left side. These were lost when the specimen was discovered accidentally by 100-ton electric shovel operators Greg Fisher and Lorne Cundal. These missing elements were reconstructed in the holotype specimen for display purposes.

=== Gastroliths ===
Gastroliths were found in the holotype after they were accidentally exposed when attempting to remove some of the rock surrounding the bottom side of the fossil block with a saw cut. This instead cut through much of the specimen's body, exposing the presence of gastroliths.

The holotype specimen preserves 165 gastroliths composed of cherts and quartzites, the largest of which had an estimated weight of 9.96 grams. These were primarily spherical pebbles. Similar gastrolith composition is seen in the elasmosaurid Wapuskanectes from the same unit, despite Wapuskanectes having ten times more mass than Nichollsaura. The former did have larger gastroliths and an estimated five times the weight in gastroliths however.

The gastroliths in both genera were found to have similar composition to the early Aptian aged conglomerate rocks in the Cadomin Formation, suggesting that the two genera collected stones from the same geographic area. These rocks are 8-10 million years older than the Wabiskaw member plesiosaurs, so it is hypothesized that they may have swum westward from the northern Western Interior Seaway to collect the Cadomin rocks eroding out of the beaches and river mouths of the Seaway's western coast.

== Classification ==
Nichollssaura in a cladogram based on Ketchum and Benson (2011):

- Leptocleididae
  - Nichollssaura
  - - Brancasaurus
    - - Umoonasaurus
      - Leptocleidus
        - L. capensis
        - L. superstes

== Gallery ==
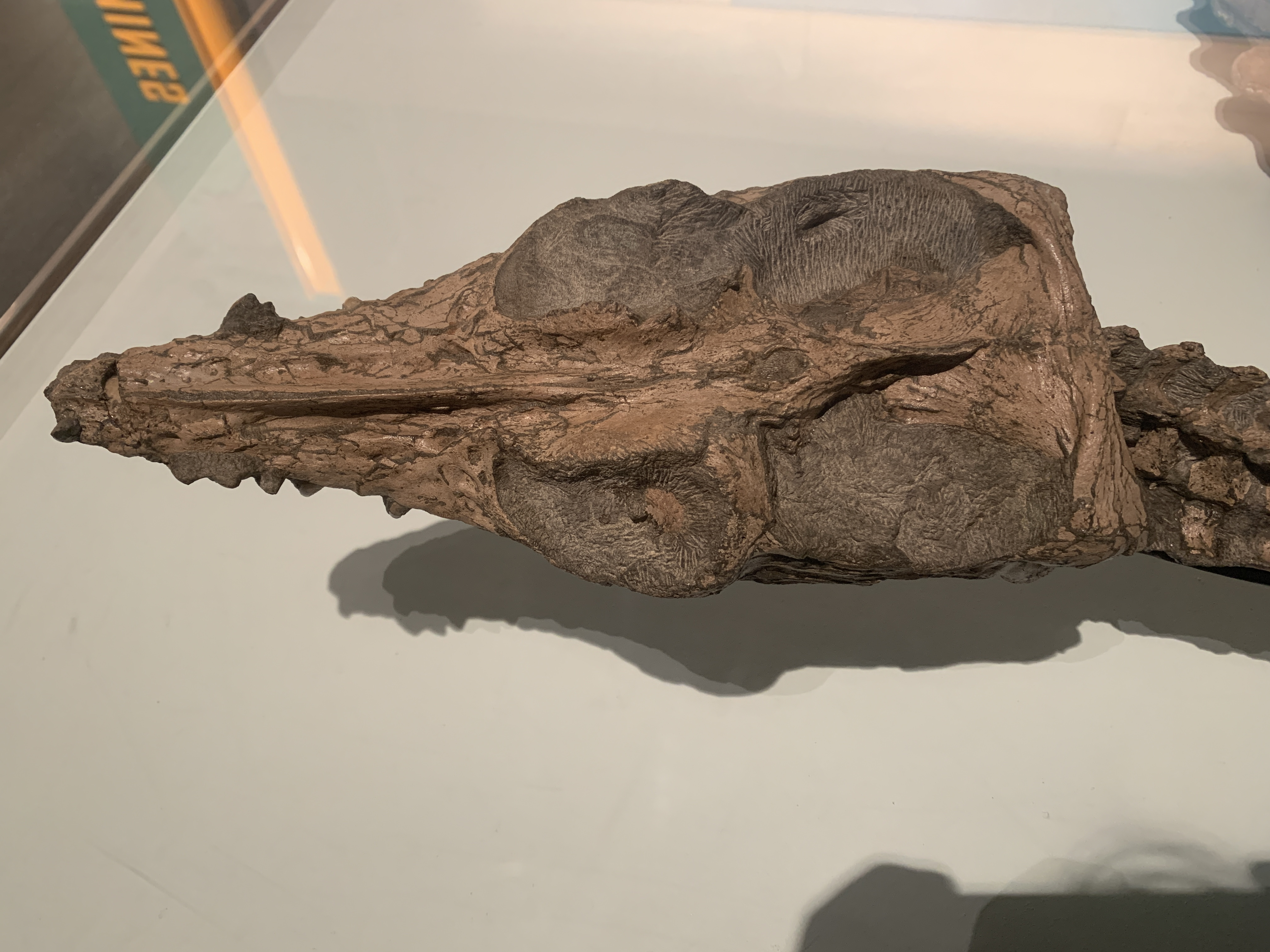
skull (dorsal view)

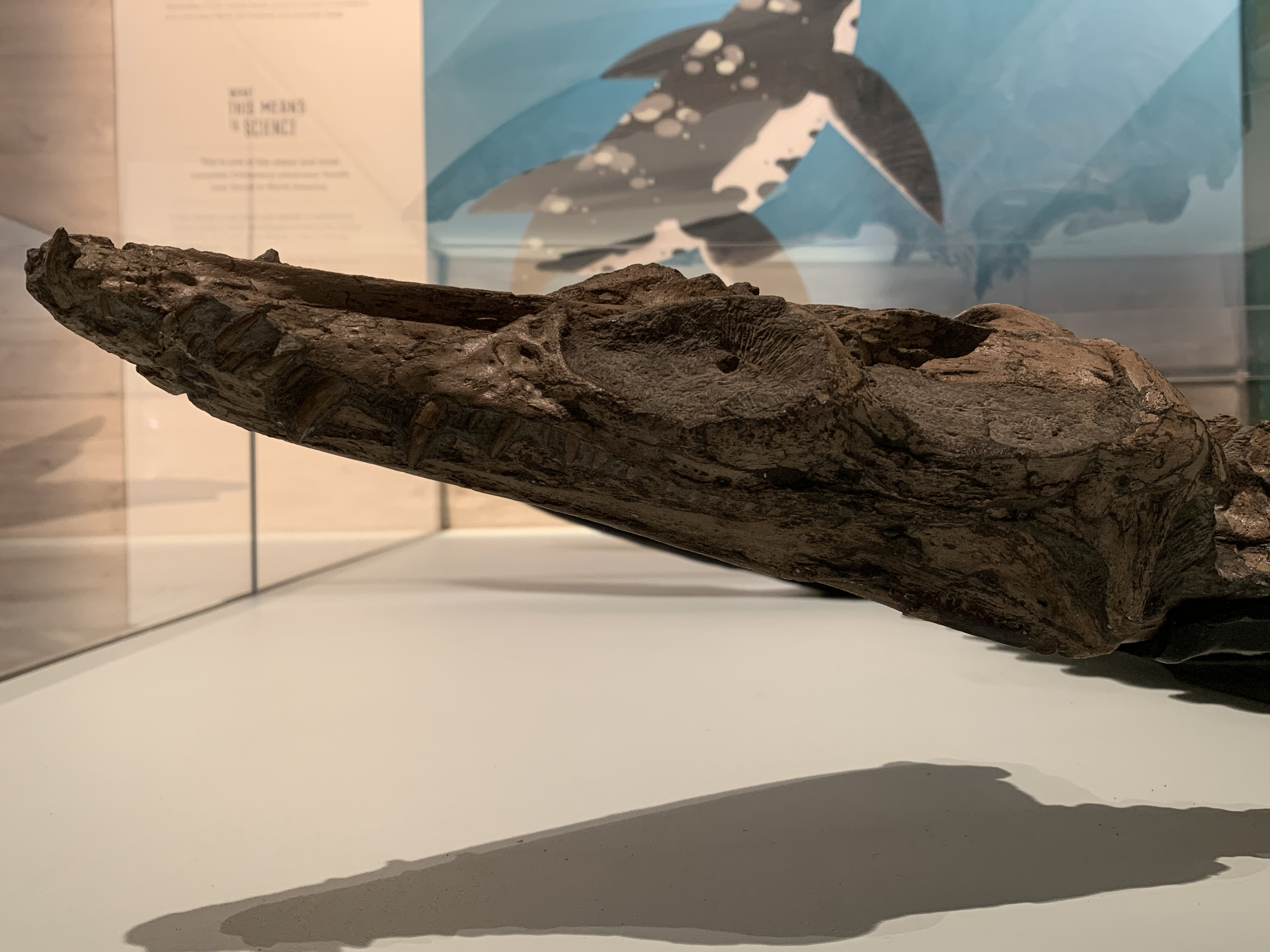
skull (left lateral view)

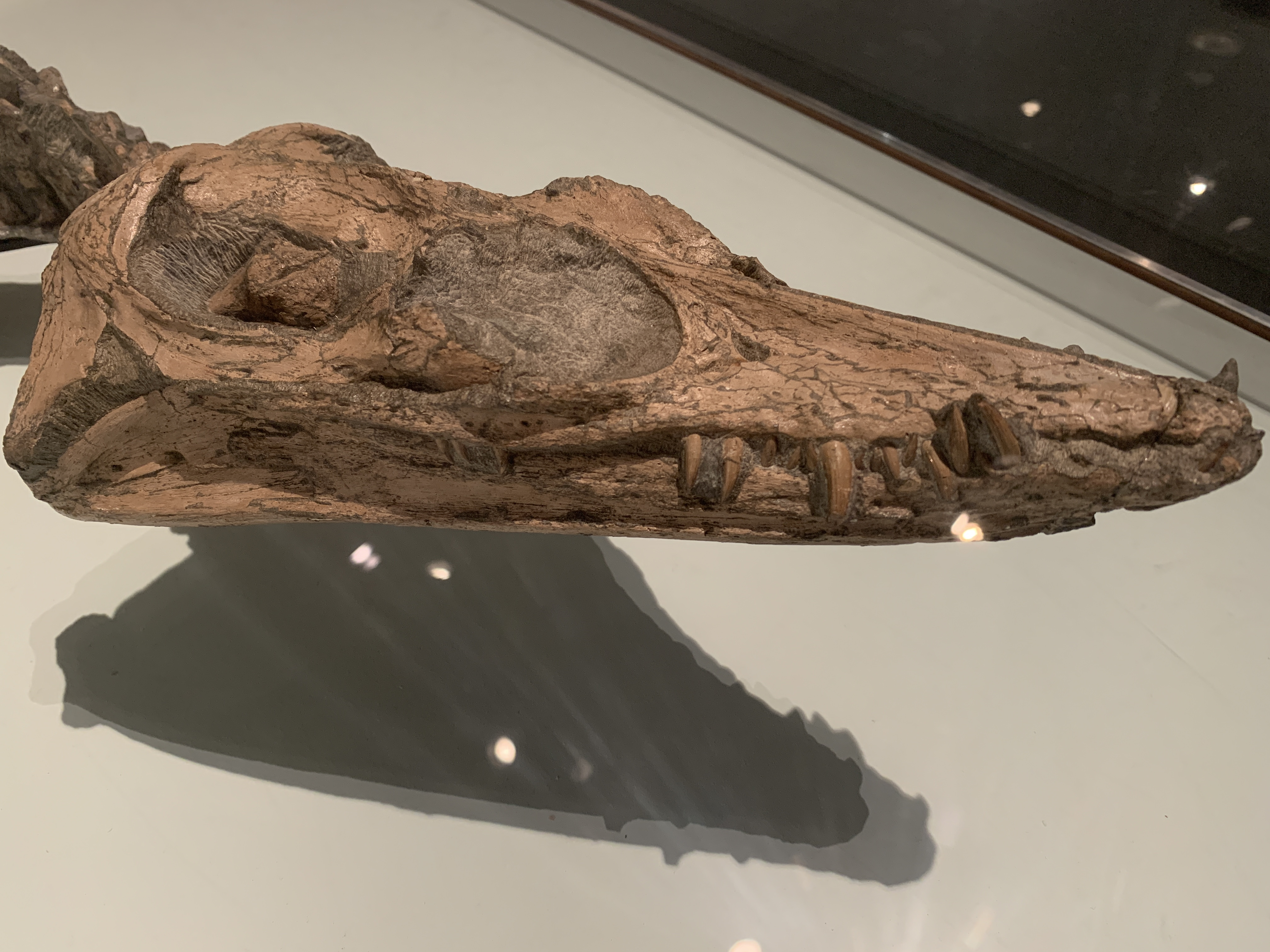
skull (right lateral view)

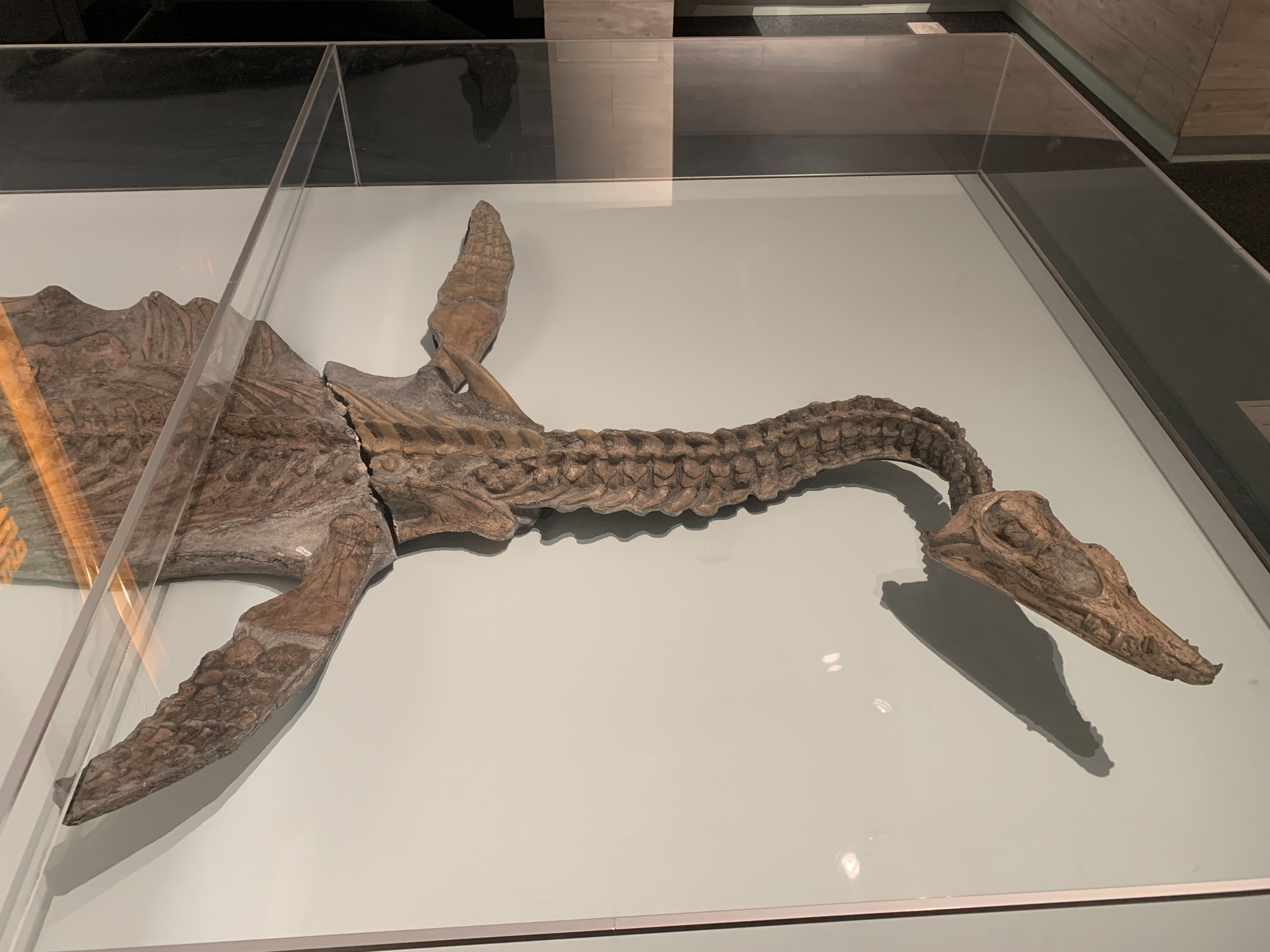

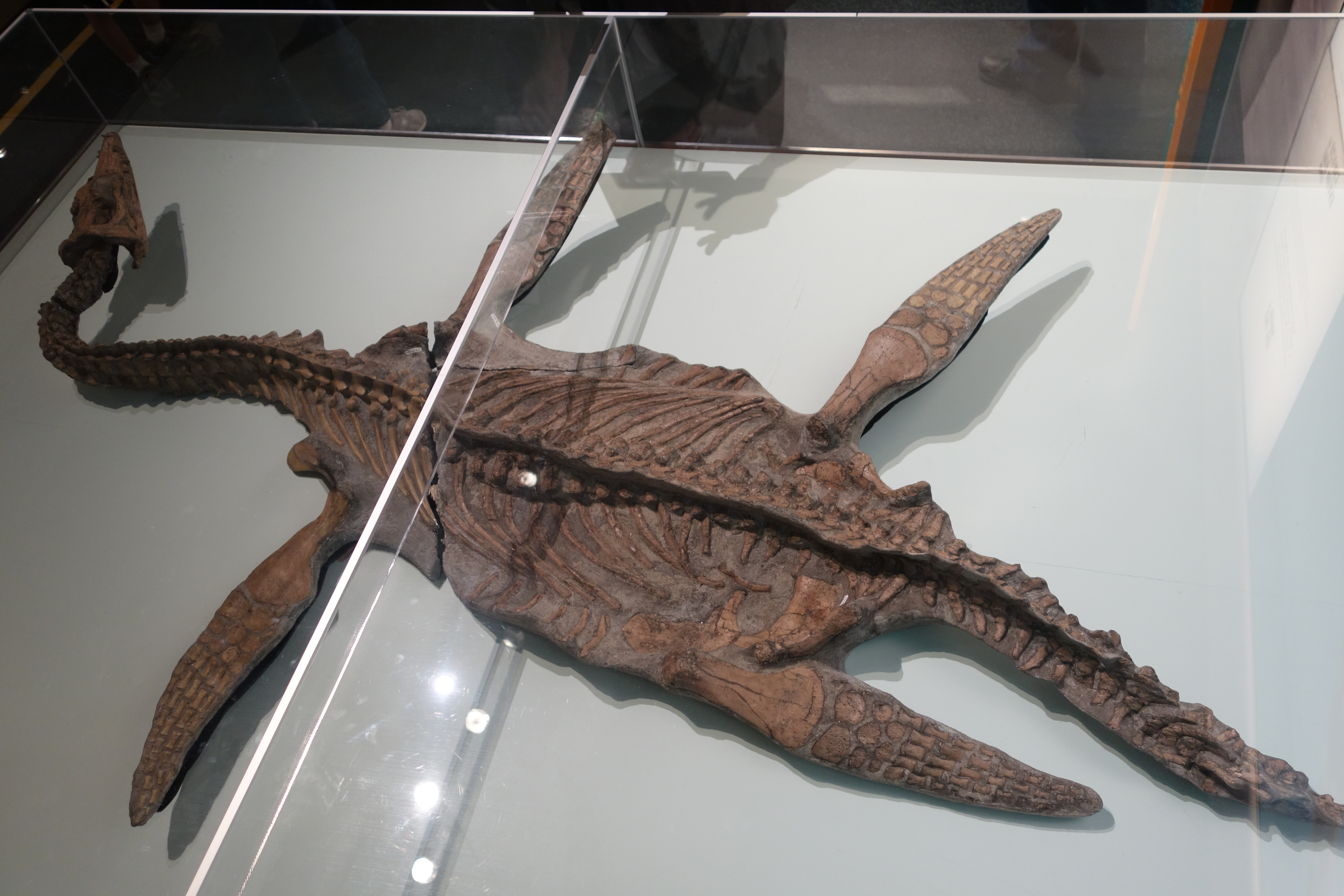

== See also ==
- List of plesiosaur genera
- Timeline of plesiosaur research
