= Birdrong Sandstone =

Geologic formation in Australia

- Stratigraphic range: Hauterivian-Barremian; ~132–125 Ma
- Type: Geological formation
- Unit of: Barrow Group
- Underlies: Muderong Shale, Windalia Radiolarite & Tamala Limestone
- Overlies: Kockatea Shale, Forestier Claystone & Zeepaard Formation
- Thickness: Up to 79 m (259 ft)

Lithology
- Primary: Sandstone
- Other: Glauconite

Location
- Coordinates: 27.7°S 114.2°E
- Approximate paleocoordinates: 52.9°S 70.0°E
- Region: Western Australia
- Country: Australia
- Extent: Carnarvon Basin
- Birdrong Sandstone (Australia) Birdrong Sandstone (Western Australia)

The Birdrong Sandstone is a Lower Cretaceous (Hauterivian to Barremian) geologic formation of the Barrow Group in Western Australia. Dinosaur remains are among the fossils that have been recovered from the formation, although none have yet been referred to a specific genus.

== Description ==
The Birdrong Sandstone has a maximum thickness of 79 metres (259 ft). The formation overlies the Kockatea Shale, Forestier Claystone and Zeepaard Formation and is overlain by the Muderong Shale, Windalia Radiolarite and Tamala Limestone. At its type section at Mardathuna Station, northeast of Carnarvon, the Birdrong Sandstone begins with a fluvial phase of deposition, followed by deltaic and shallow marine facies.

== Fossil content ==
The following fossils were reported from the formation:

- Dinosaurs
  - Tetanurae indet.
  - Theropoda indet.
- Sauropterygia
  - Leptocleidus clemai
  - Leptocleidus sp.

== See also ==
- List of dinosaur-bearing rock formations
  - List of stratigraphic units with indeterminate dinosaur fossils
- South Polar region of the Cretaceous
