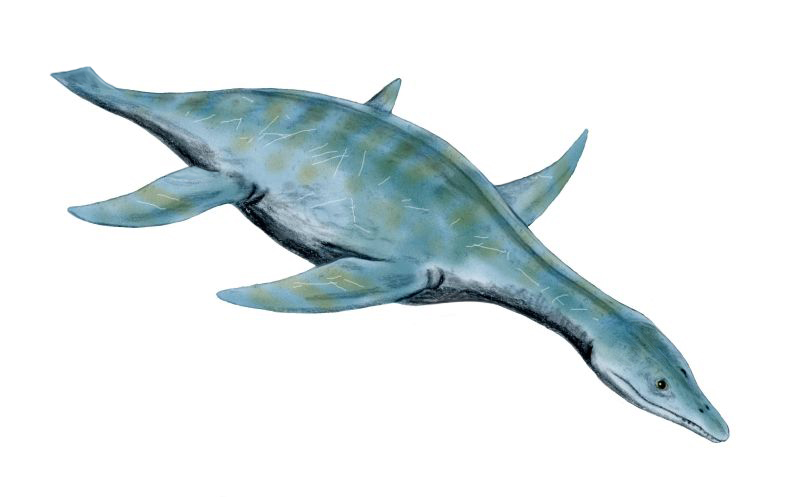
- Leptocleidus

Scientific classification
- Kingdom: Animalia
- Phylum: Chordata
- Class: Reptilia
- Superorder: †Sauropterygia
- Order: †Plesiosauria
- Superfamily: †Plesiosauroidea
- Clade: †Leptocleidia
- Family: †Leptocleididae; White, 1940

Genera
- †Brancasaurus; †Hastanectes; †Leptocleidus; †Nichollssaura; †Umoonasaurus; †Vectocleidus

= Leptocleididae =

Leptocleididae Temporal range: Early Cretaceous, Berriasian–Albian

Extinct family of reptiles

Leptocleididae is a family of small-sized plesiosaurs that lived during the Early Cretaceous period (early Berriasian to early Albian stage). They had small bodies with small heads and short necks. Leptocleidus and Umoonasaurus had round bodies and triangle-shaped heads. Leptocleidids have been found in what were shallow nearshore, freshwater and brackish habitats. Hilary F. Ketchum and Roger B. J. Benson (2010), transferred Brancasaurus, Kaiwhekea, Nichollssaura and Thililua to this family. However, Ketchum and Benson (2011) reassigned Kaiwhekea and Thililua to their original positions, as an elasmosaurid and a polycotylid, respectively.

== Phylogeny ==
- Leptocleididae
  - Kaiwhekea
  - - - Nichollssaura
      - Thililua
    - - Brancasaurus
      - - Umoonasaurus
        - Leptocleidus
          - L. capensis
          - L. superstes

Cladogram based on Ketchum and Benson (2011):

- Leptocleididae
  - Nichollssaura
  - - Brancasaurus
    - - Umoonasaurus
      - Leptocleidus
        - L. capensis
        - L. superstes
