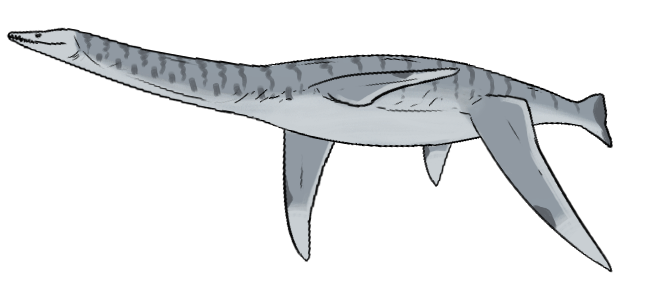
- Life restoration

Scientific classification
- Domain: Eukaryota
- Kingdom: Animalia
- Phylum: Chordata
- Class: Reptilia
- Superorder: †Sauropterygia
- Order: †Plesiosauria
- Family: †Leptocleididae
- Genus: †Hastanectes; Benson et al., 2012

Type species
- †Hastanectes valdensis (Lydekker, 1889 [originally Cimoliasaurus valdensis])

= Hastanectes =

Hastanectes Temporal range: Early Cretaceous, Valanginian

Extinct genus of reptiles

Hastanectes is an extinct genus of a plesiosaurian with possible pliosaurid affinities known from the Early Cretaceous Wadhurst Clay Formation (Valanginian stage) of the United Kingdom. It contains a single species, Hastanectes valdensis, which was originally thought to be a species of Cimoliasaurus.

== See also ==
- List of plesiosaur genera
- Timeline of plesiosaur research
