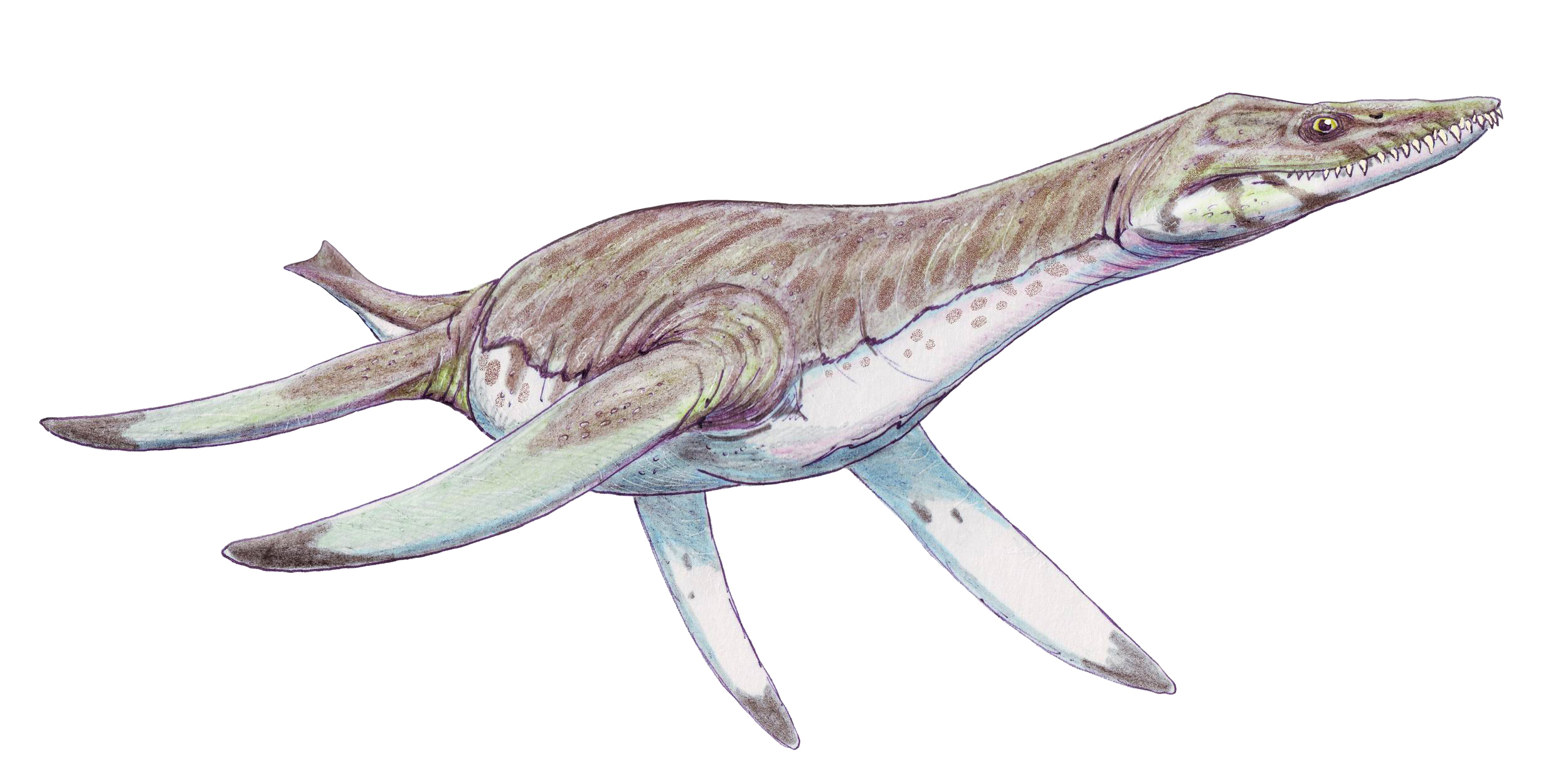
- Life restoration

Scientific classification
- Domain: Eukaryota
- Kingdom: Animalia
- Phylum: Chordata
- Class: Reptilia
- Superorder: †Sauropterygia
- Order: †Plesiosauria
- Family: †Leptocleididae
- Genus: †Vectocleidus; Benson et al., 2012

Type species
- †Vectocleidus pastorum Benson et al., 2012

= Vectocleidus =

Vectocleidus Temporal range: Early Cretaceous, 127–125 Ma

Extinct genus of reptiles

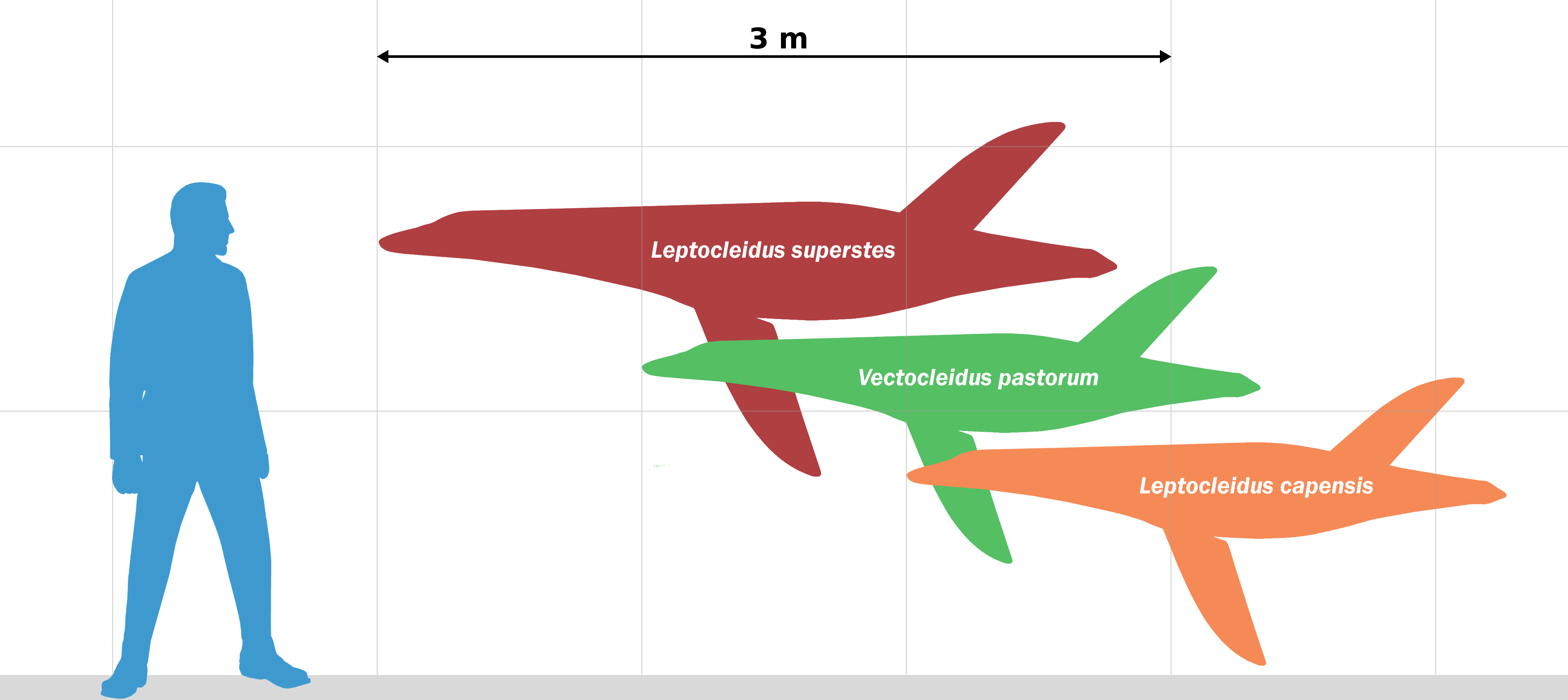
Size (green) compared to a human

Vectocleidus is an extinct genus of leptocleidid plesiosaurian known from the Early Cretaceous Vectis Formation (late Barremian stage) of Isle of Wight, in the United Kingdom. It contains a single species, Vectocleidus pastorum.

== See also ==
- List of plesiosaur genera
- Timeline of plesiosaur research
