= Exter Formation =

Geological formation in Germany

- Stratigraphic range: Rhaetian; ~208–201 Ma
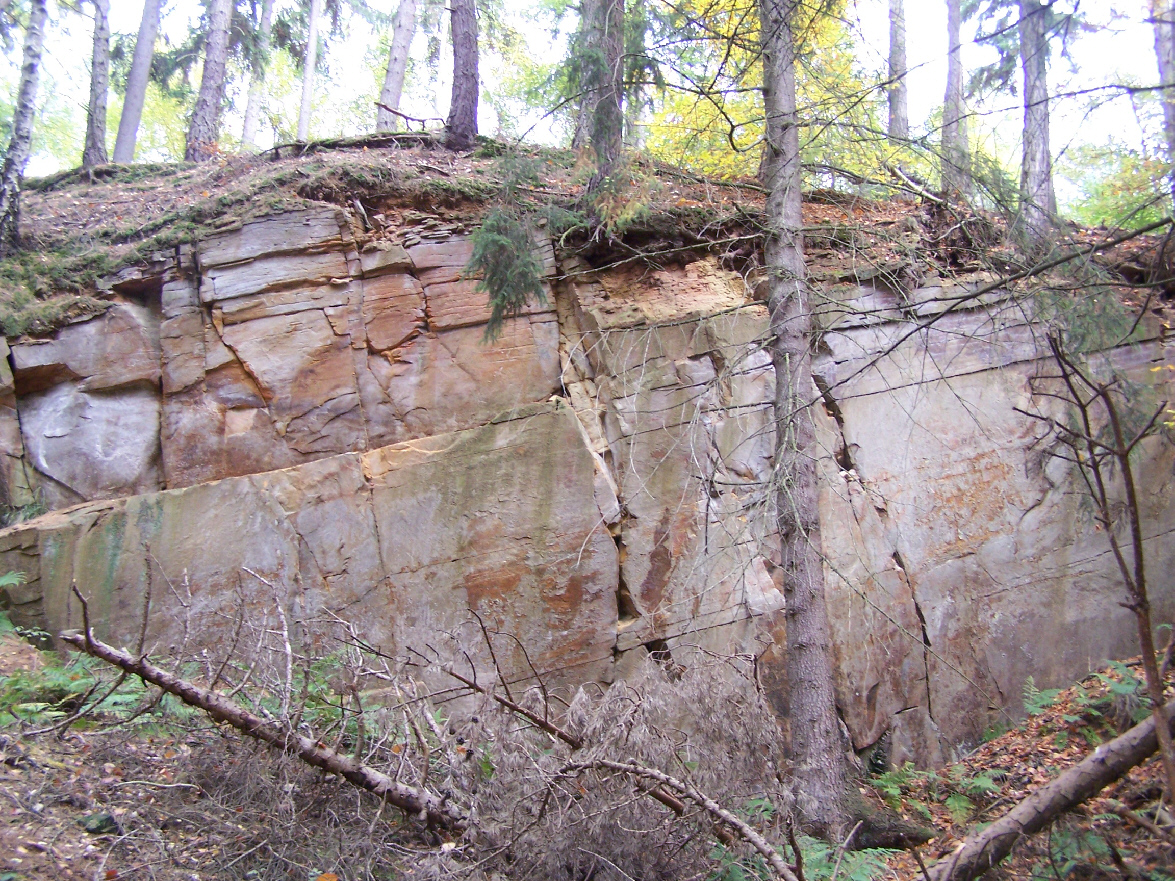
- Exter Formation at Krauthausen
- Type: Formation
- Unit of: Keuper
- Sub-units: Rinteln, Oeynhausen & Vahlbruch Subformations
- Underlies: Black Jurassic
- Overlies: Arnstadt & Trossingen Formations
- Thickness: Typically between 100 and 150 m (330 and 490 ft); Locally 250 m (820 ft) in northern Germany; Up to 45 m (148 ft) in southern Germany

Lithology
- Primary: Claystone, siltstone, sandstone
- Other: Coal

Location
- Coordinates: 48.6°N 9.1°E
- Approximate paleocoordinates: 36.1°N 10.8°E
- Region: Niedersachsen, Baden-Württemberg, Westphalia, Bavaria
- Country: Germany
- Extent: Widespread
- Exter Formation (Germany)

The Exter Formation is the only formation of the Upper Keuper or Rhätsandstein, and is a geologic formation in Germany. It preserves fossils dating back to the Rhaetian of the Triassic period (specifically around 205 Ma).

== Fossil content ==
The formation has provided fossils of:

=== Mammals ===
- Thomasia antiqua
- Haramiyidae indet.

=== Therapsids ===
- Chalepotherium plieningeri

=== Reptiles ===
- "Ichthyosaurus" rhaeticus
- Megalosaurus cloacinus
- Nothosaurus cloacinus
- Phytosaurus cubicodon?
- Phytosaurus cylindricodon?
- Plateosaurus ornatus
- Rhaeticosaurus mertensi
- Termatosaurus albertii
- Termatosaurus crocodilinus
- Plateosaurus sp.
- Plesiosauria indet.
- Saurophodomorpha indet.
- Pterosauria indet.

=== Fish ===
- Ceratodus cloacinus
- C. heteromorphus
- C. parvus
- C. trapezoides
- Hybodus cloacinus
- H. sublaevis
- Lissodus minimus
- Nemacanthus monilifer
- Sargodon tomicus
- Acrodus sp.
- Asterolepis sp.
- Raja sp.

=== Insects ===
- Triassothemis gartzii

=== Flora ===
- Becklesia franconica

== See also ==
- List of fossiliferous stratigraphic units in Germany
