= Rhaeticosaurus =

Rhaeticosaurus Temporal range: Late Triassic, 205 Ma

Scientific classification
- Kingdom: Animalia
- Phylum: Chordata
- Class: Reptilia
- Superorder: †Sauropterygia
- Order: †Plesiosauria
- Suborder: †Pliosauroidea
- Genus: †Rhaeticosaurus Wintrich et al., 2017

Type species
- †Rhaeticosaurus mertensi Wintrich et al., 2017

Extinct genus of reptiles

Rhaeticosaurus (meaning 'Rhaetian lizard') is an extinct genus of basal pliosauroid from the Late Triassic (Rhaetian) rocks of the Exter Formation. The type and only species, R. mertensi, was named by Wintrich et al. in 2017. It is known from a partial articulated skeleton.

== Discovery and naming ==
The holotype is LWL-MFN P 64047 and it was discovered in Clay pit #3 belonging to the Lücking brick company in 2013, in the section below the Triassic-Jurassic boundary and about 3.5 metres (11 ft) below a bonebed containing a vertebrate fauna of Rhaetian age. It was acquired by an anonymous private collector, who notified authorities and the specimen was eventually prepared and named as Rhaeticosaurus mertensi in 2017.

== Description ==
Based on the holotype, Rhaeticosaurus grew up to 2.37 metres (7.8 ft) when fully grown.
