= List of plesiosaur type specimens =

This list of plesiosaur type specimens is a list of fossils serving as the official standard-bearers for inclusion in the species and genera of the reptile clade Plesiosauria, which includes the short-necked pliosaurs and long necked plesiosauroids. Type specimens are those which are definitionally members of biological taxa and additional specimens can only be "referred" to these taxa if an expert deems them sufficiently similar to the type.

== The list ==
Species	Genus	Nickname	Catalogue number	Institution	Age	Unit	Country	Notes	Images
Dolichorhynchops osborni	Dolichorhynchops	N/A	KUVP 1300						
Elasmosaurus platyurus	Elasmosaurus	N/A	ANSP 10081 "(not ANSP 18001 as reported by Welles)" -Kenneth Carpenter						
Libonectes morgani	Libonectes	N/A	SMUSMP 69120						
Plesiosaurus brachypterygius	N/A	N/A	GPIT von Huene 1923, pls 1–2						
Plesiosaurus dolichodeirus	Plesiosaurus	N/A	BMNH 22656				United Kingdom		BMNH 22656
Plesiosaurus guilelmiimperatoris	N/A	N/A	MB. 1893/94.1961 [Holotype] O						
Plesiosaurus macromus	N/A	N/A	OXFUM J.28587						
Seeleyosaurus holzmadensis		N/A	SMNS 12039						
