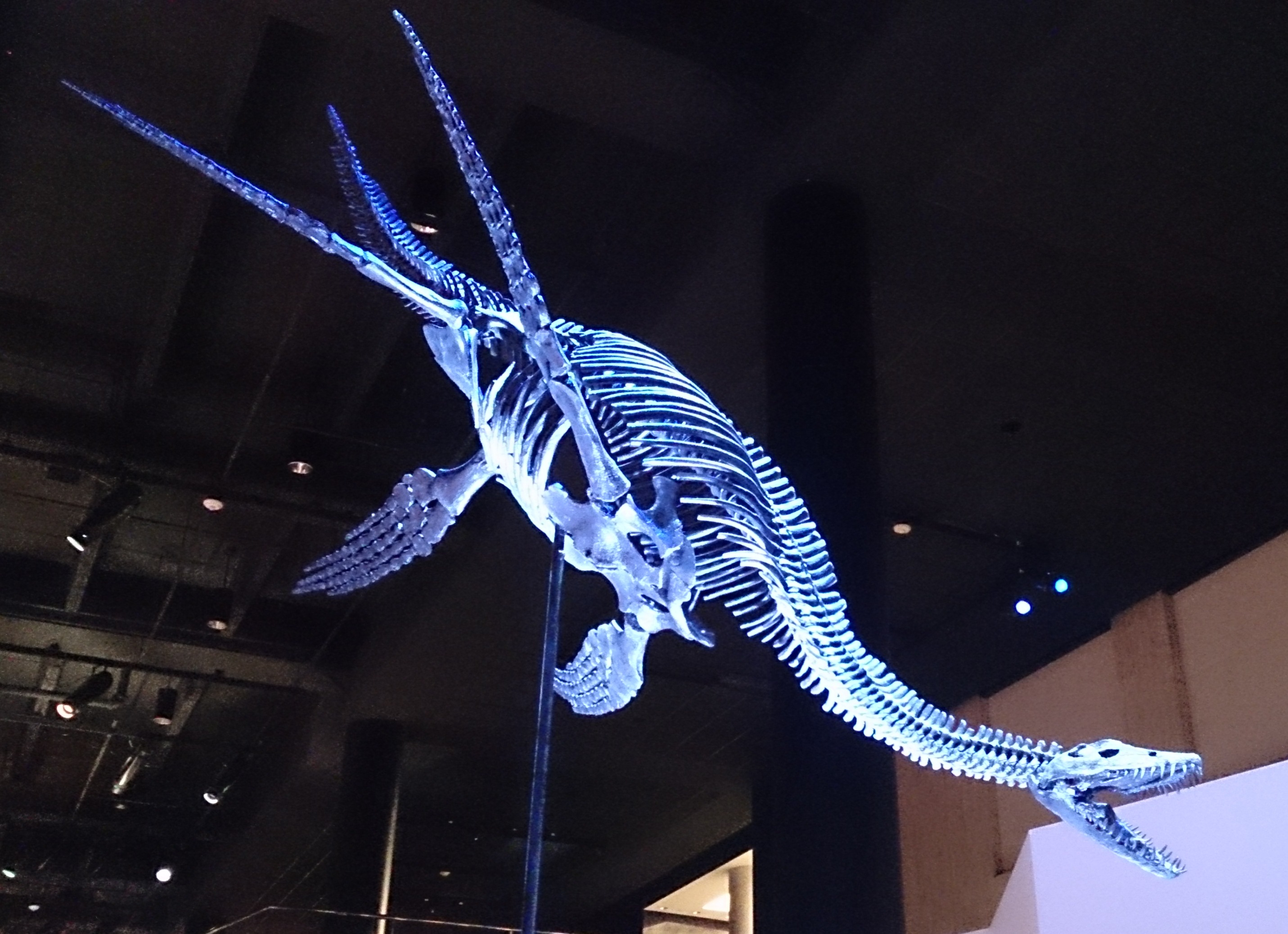
- Restored skeleton of Plesiosaurus (a plesiosauroid)
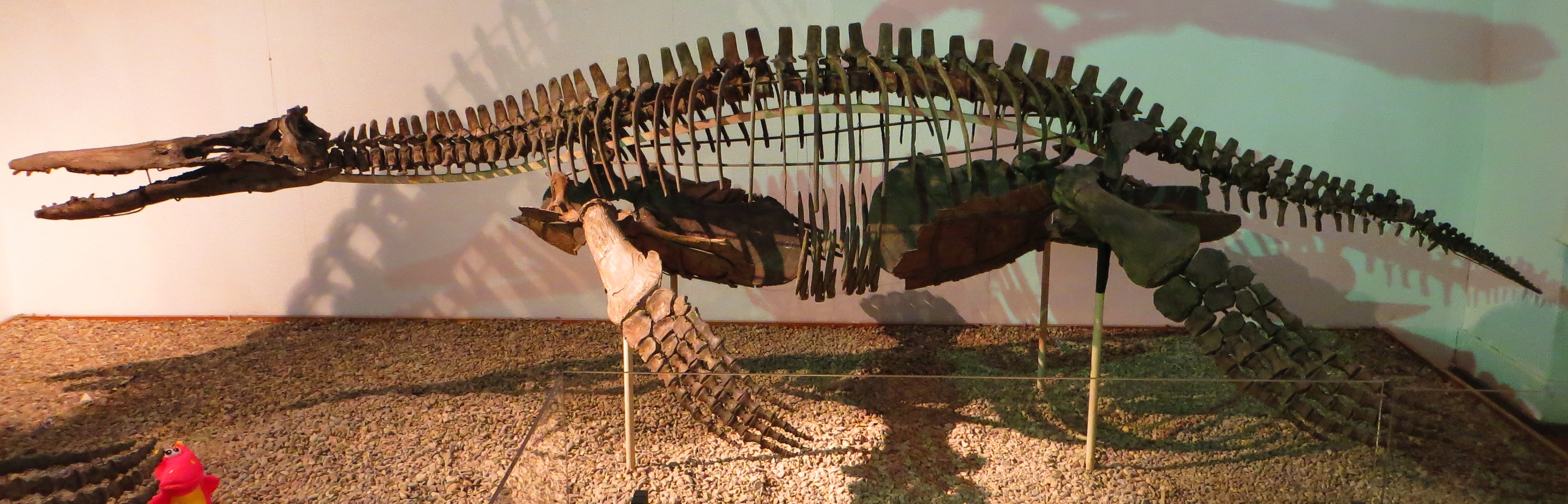
- Skeletal mount of Peloneustes (a pliosaur)

Scientific classification
- Kingdom: Animalia
- Phylum: Chordata
- Class: Reptilia
- Superorder: †Sauropterygia
- Clade: †Pistosauroidea
- Order: †Plesiosauria; Blainville, 1835

Subgroups
- †Alexeyisaurus?; †Anningasaura; †Rarosaurus?; †Termatosaurus?; †Neoplesiosauria; †Plesiosauroidea; †Pliosauroidea

= Plesiosaur =

Plesiosauria Temporal range: Late Triassic – Late Cretaceous, 203–66.0 Ma

Order of reptiles (fossil)

The Plesiosauria (Note: /ˌpliːsiəˈsɔːriə, -zi-/ PLEE-see-ə-SOR-ee-ə, -zee-; Greek: πλησίος, plesios, meaning "near to" and sauros, meaning "lizard") or plesiosaurs are an order or clade of extinct Mesozoic marine reptiles, belonging to the Sauropterygia. Plesiosaurs first appeared in the latest Triassic Period, possibly in the Rhaetian stage, about 203 million years ago. They became especially common during the Jurassic Period, thriving until their disappearance due to the Cretaceous–Paleogene extinction event at the end of the Cretaceous Period, about 66 million years ago. They had a worldwide oceanic distribution, and some species at least partly inhabited freshwater environments.

Plesiosaurs were among the first fossil reptiles discovered. In the beginning of the nineteenth century, scientists realised how distinctive their build was and they were named as a separate order in 1835. The first plesiosaurian genus, the eponymous Plesiosaurus, was named in 1821. Since then, more than a hundred valid species have been described. In the early twenty-first century, the number of discoveries has increased, leading to an improved understanding of their anatomy, relationships and way of life.

Plesiosaurs had a broad flat body and a short tail. Their limbs had evolved into four long flippers, which were powered by strong muscles attached to wide bony plates formed by the shoulder girdle and the pelvis. The flippers made a flying movement through the water. Plesiosaurs breathed air, and bore live young; there are indications that they were warm-blooded.

Plesiosaurs showed two main morphological types. Some species, with the "plesiosauromorph" build, had (sometimes extremely) long necks and small heads; these were relatively slow and caught small sea animals. Other species had the "pliosauromorph" build with a short neck and a large head; these were apex predators, fast hunters of large prey. The two types are related to the traditional strict division of the Plesiosauria into two suborders, the long-necked Plesiosauroidea and the short-neck Pliosauroidea. Modern research, however, indicates that several "long-necked" groups might have had some short-necked members or vice versa. Therefore, the purely descriptive terms "plesiosauromorph" and "pliosauromorph" have been introduced, which do not imply a direct relationship. "Plesiosauroidea" and "Pliosauroidea" today have a more limited meaning. The term "plesiosaur" is properly used to refer to the Plesiosauria as a whole, but informally it is sometimes meant to indicate only the long-necked forms, the old Plesiosauroidea.

Like other ancient marine reptiles, such as those in the clades Ichthyosauria and Mosasauria, the genera in Plesiosauria are not part of the clade Dinosauria.

== History of discovery ==
=== Early finds ===
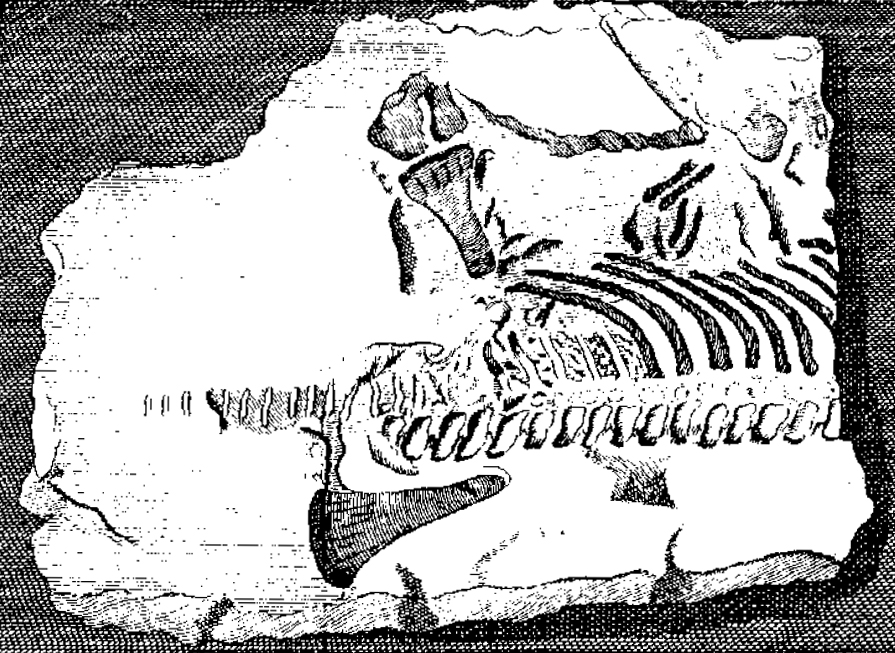
First published plesiosaur skeleton, 1719 (specimen NHMUK PV R.1330)

Skeletal elements of plesiosaurs are among the first fossils of extinct reptiles recognised as such. In 1605, Richard Verstegen of Antwerp illustrated in his A Restitution of Decayed Intelligence plesiosaur vertebrae that he referred to fishes and saw as proof that Great Britain was once connected to the European continent. The Welshman Edward Lhuyd in his Lithophylacii Brittannici Ichnographia from 1699 also included depictions of plesiosaur vertebrae that again were considered fish vertebrae or Ichthyospondyli. Other naturalists during the seventeenth century added plesiosaur remains to their collections, such as John Woodward; these were only much later understood to be of a plesiosaurian nature and are today partly preserved in the Sedgwick Museum.

In 1719, William Stukeley described a partial skeleton of a plesiosaur, which had been brought to his attention by Robert Darwin of Elston, the great-grandfather of Charles Darwin. The stone plate holding the fossils came from a quarry at Fulbeck in Lincolnshire and had been used, with the fossil at its underside, to reinforce the slope of a watering-hole in Elston in Nottinghamshire. After the strange bones it contained had been discovered, the stone was displayed in the local vicarage as the remains of a sinner drowned in the Great Flood. Stukeley affirmed its "diluvial" nature but understood it represented some sea creature, perhaps a crocodile or dolphin. The specimen is today on display at the Natural History Museum, and its inventory number is NHMUK PV R.1330 (formerly BMNH R.1330). It is the earliest discovered more or less complete fossil reptile skeleton in a museum collection. It can perhaps be referred to Plesiosaurus dolichodeirus.

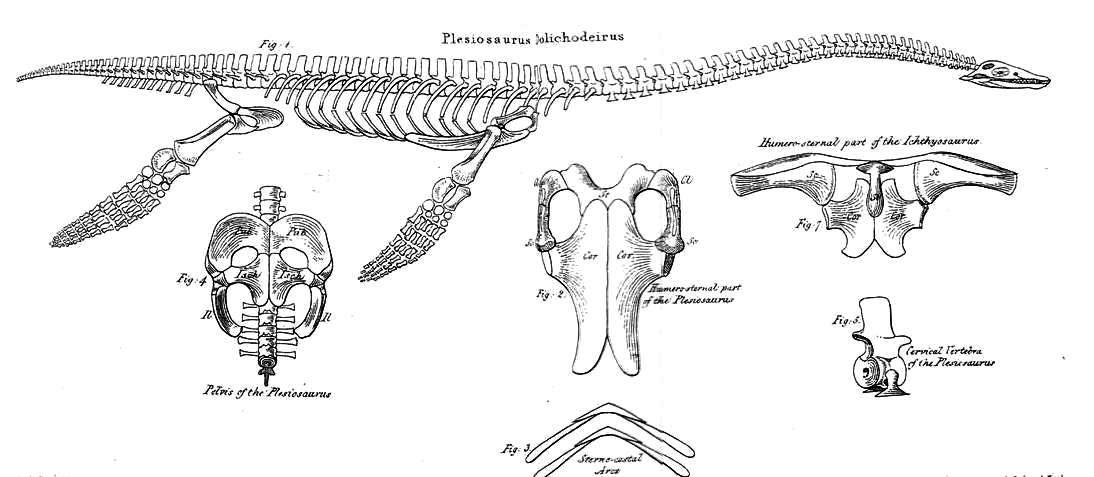
As this illustration shows, Conybeare by 1824 had gained a basically correct understanding of plesiosaur anatomy.

During the eighteenth century, the number of English plesiosaur discoveries rapidly increased, although these were all of a more or less fragmentary nature. Important collectors were the reverends William Mounsey and Baptist Noel Turner, active in the Vale of Belvoir, whose collections were in 1795 described by John Nicholls in the first part of his The History and Antiquities of the County of Leicestershire. One of Turner's partial plesiosaur skeletons is still preserved as specimen NHMUK PV R.45 (formerly BMNH R.45) in the British Museum of Natural History; this is today referred to Thalassiodracon.

=== Naming of Plesiosaurus ===
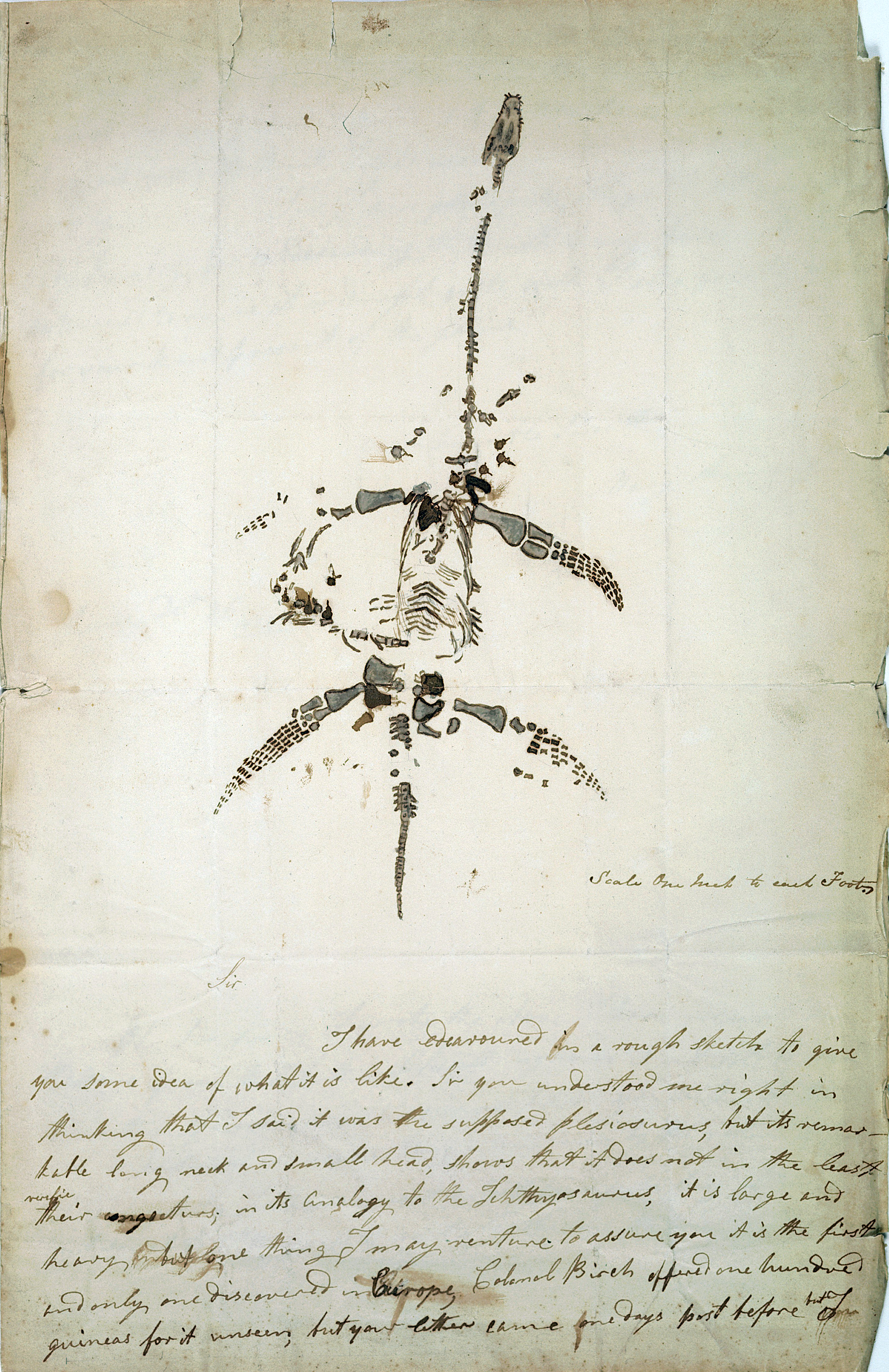
Complete Plesiosaurus skeleton (specimen NHMUK OR 22656) recovered by the Annings in 1823

In the early nineteenth century, plesiosaurs were still poorly known and their special build was not understood. No systematic distinction was made with ichthyosaurs, so the fossils of one group were sometimes combined with those of the other to obtain a more complete specimen. In 1821, a partial skeleton discovered in the collection of Colonel Thomas James Birch, was described by William Conybeare and Henry Thomas De la Beche, and recognised as representing a distinctive group. A new genus was named, Plesiosaurus. The generic name was derived from the Ancient Greek πλήσιος, plèsios, "closer to" and the Latinised saurus, in the meaning of "saurian", to express that Plesiosaurus was in the Chain of Being more closely positioned to the Sauria, particularly the crocodile, than Ichthyosaurus, which had the form of a more lowly fish. The name should thus be rather read as "approaching the Sauria" or "near reptile" than as "near lizard". Parts of the specimen are still present in the Oxford University Museum of Natural History.

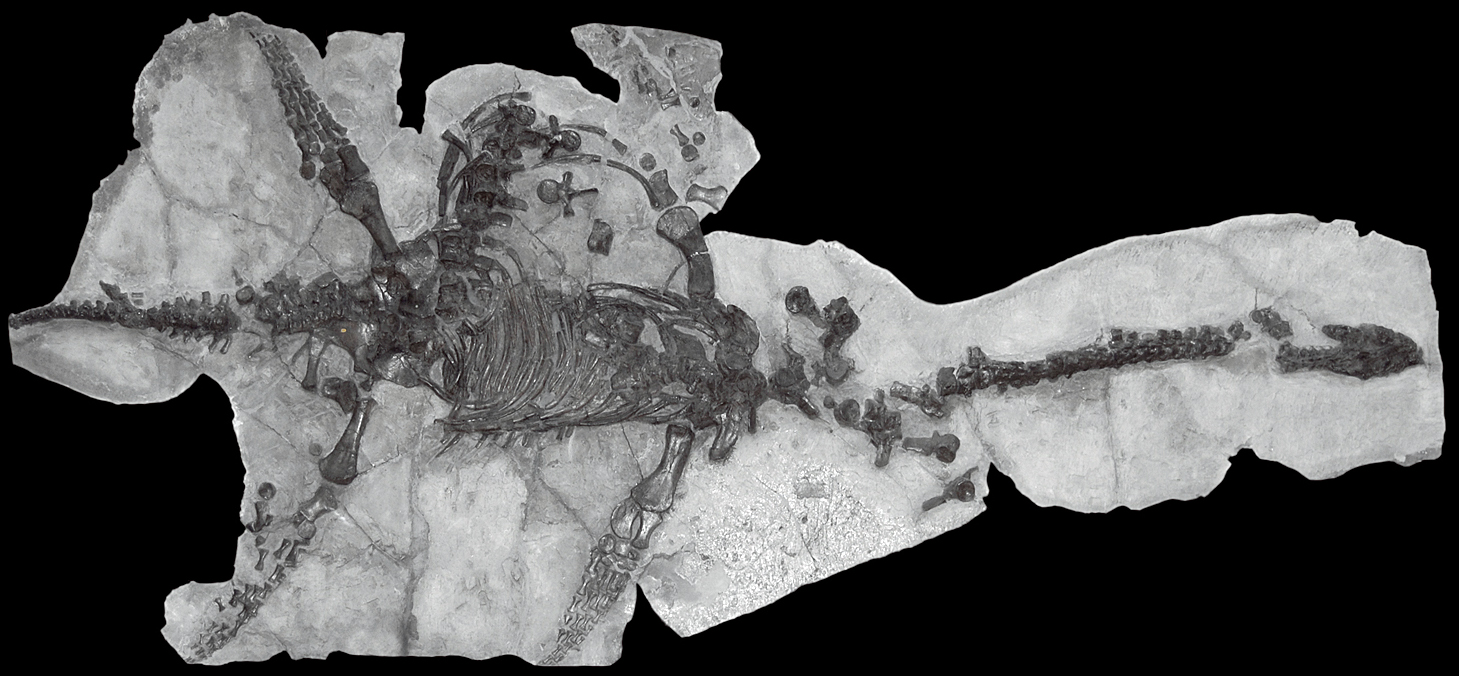
Mary Anning's plesiosaur: specimen NHMUK PV OR 22656 of Plesiosaurus dolichodeirus

Soon afterwards, the morphology became much better known. In 1823, Thomas Clark reported an almost complete skull, probably belonging to Thalassiodracon, which is now preserved by the British Geological Survey as specimen BGS GSM 26035. The same year, commercial fossil collector Mary Anning and her family uncovered an almost complete skeleton at Lyme Regis in Dorset, England, on what is today called the Jurassic Coast. It was acquired by the Duke of Buckingham, who made it available to the geologist William Buckland. He in turn let it be described by Conybeare on 20 February 1824 in a paper read at the Geological Society of London, during the same meeting in which for the first time a dinosaur was named, Megalosaurus. The two finds revealed the unique and bizarre build of the animals, in 1832 by Professor Buckland likened to "a sea serpent run through a turtle". In 1824, Conybeare also provided a specific name to Plesiosaurus: dolichodeirus, meaning "longneck". In 1848, the skeleton was bought by the British Museum of Natural History and catalogued as specimen NHMUK OR 22656 (formerly BMNH 22656). When the paper was published in the Transactions of the Geological Society, Conybeare provisionally named a second species: Plesiosaurus giganteus. This was a short-necked form later assigned to the Pliosauroidea.

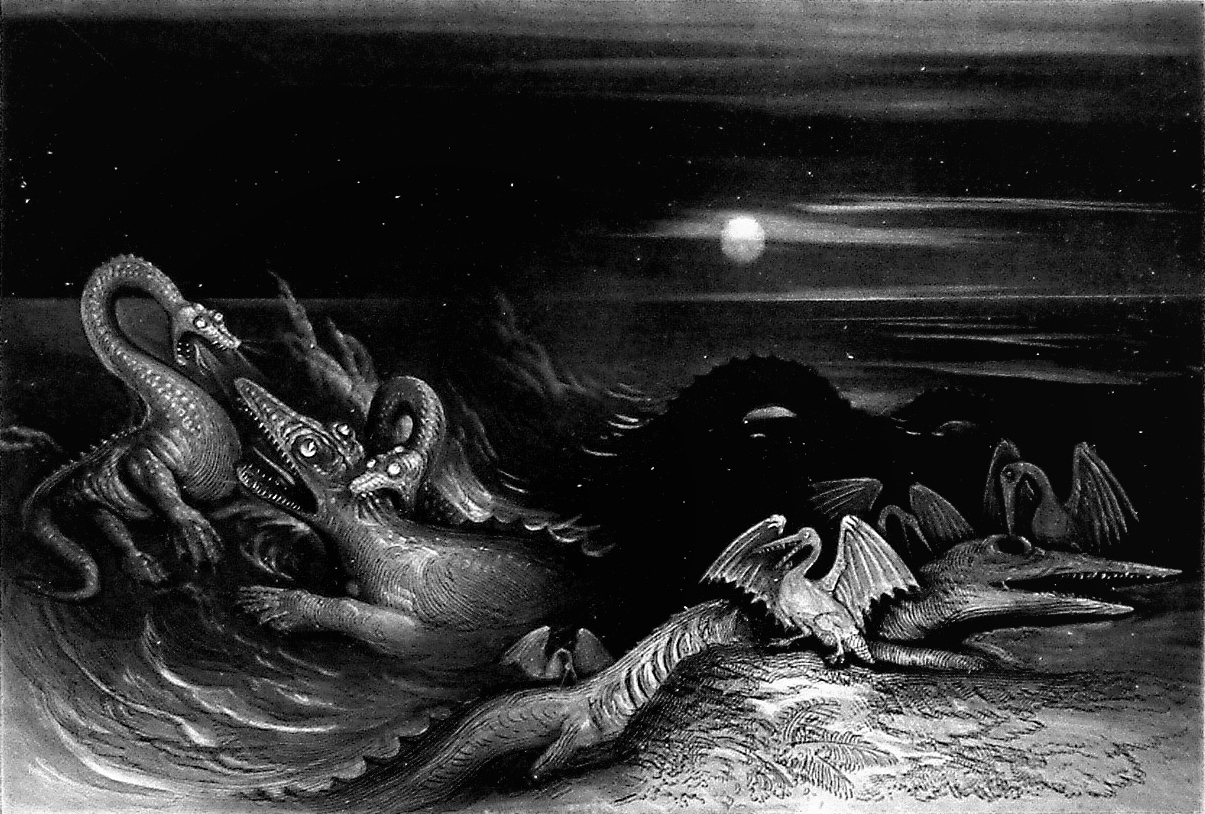
Hawkins's demonic plesiosaurs battling other sea-monsters in primordial darkness

Plesiosaurs became better known to the general public through two lavishly illustrated publications by the collector Thomas Hawkins: Memoirs of Ichthyosauri and Plesiosauri of 1834 and The Book of the Great Sea-Dragons of 1840. Hawkins entertained a very idiosyncratic view of the animals, seeing them as monstrous creations of the devil, during a pre-Adamitic phase of history. Hawkins eventually sold his valuable and attractively restored specimens to the British Museum of Natural History.

During the first half of the nineteenth century, the number of plesiosaur finds steadily increased, especially through discoveries in the sea cliffs of Lyme Regis. Sir Richard Owen alone named nearly a hundred new species. The majority of their descriptions were, however, based on isolated bones, without sufficient diagnosis to be able to distinguish them from the other species that had previously been described. Many of the new species described at this time have subsequently been invalidated. The genus Plesiosaurus is particularly problematic, as the majority of the new species were placed in it so that it became a wastebasket taxon. Gradually, other genera were named. Hawkins had already created new genera, though these are no longer seen as valid. In 1841, Owen named Pliosaurus brachydeirus. Its etymology referred to the earlier Plesiosaurus dolichodeirus as it is derived from πλεῖος, pleios, "more fully", reflecting that according to Owen it was closer to the Sauria than Plesiosaurus. Its specific name means "with a short neck". Later, the Pliosauridae were recognised as having a morphology fundamentally different from the plesiosaurids. The family Plesiosauridae had already been coined by John Edward Gray in 1825. In 1835, Henri Marie Ducrotay de Blainville named the order Plesiosauria itself.

=== American discoveries ===
In the second half of the nineteenth century, important finds were made outside of England. While this included some German discoveries, it mainly involved plesiosaurs found in the sediments of the American Cretaceous Western Interior Seaway, the Niobrara Chalk. One fossil in particular marked the start of the Bone Wars between the rival paleontologists Edward Drinker Cope and Othniel Charles Marsh.

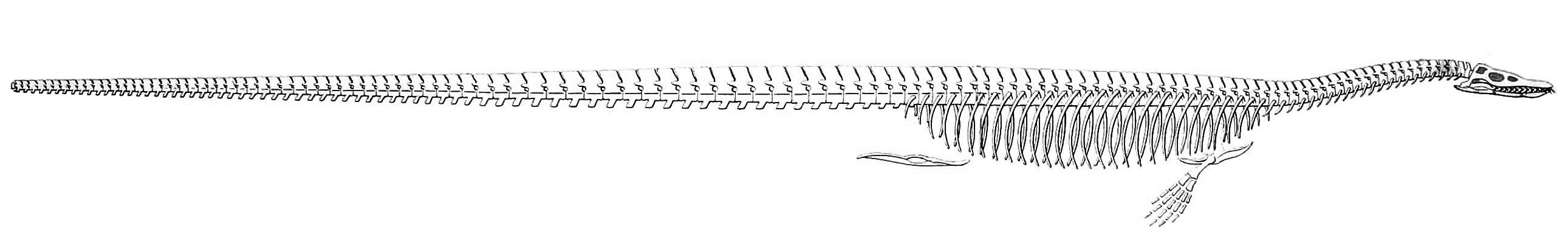
Cope's Elasmosaurus with its head on the tail and lacking hindlimbs

In 1867, physician Theophilus Turner near Fort Wallace in Kansas uncovered a plesiosaur skeleton, which he donated to Cope. Cope attempted to reconstruct the animal on the assumption that the longer extremity of the vertebral column was the tail, the shorter one the neck. He soon noticed that the skeleton taking shape under his hands had some very special qualities: the neck vertebrae had chevrons and with the tail vertebrae the joint surfaces were orientated back to front. Excited, Cope concluded to have discovered an entirely new group of reptiles: the Streptosauria or "Turned Saurians", which would be distinguished by reversed vertebrae and a lack of hindlimbs, the tail providing the main propulsion. After having published a description of this animal, followed by an illustration in a textbook about reptiles and amphibians, Cope invited Marsh and Joseph Leidy to admire his new Elasmosaurus platyurus. Having listened to Cope's interpretation for a while, Marsh suggested that a simpler explanation of the strange build would be that Cope had reversed the vertebral column relative to the body as a whole. When Cope reacted indignantly to this suggestion, Leidy silently took the skull and placed it against the presumed last tail vertebra, to which it fitted perfectly: it was in fact the first neck vertebra, with still a piece of the rear skull attached to it. Mortified, Cope tried to destroy the entire edition of the textbook and, when this failed, immediately published an improved edition with a correct illustration but an identical date of publication. He excused his mistake by claiming that he had been misled by Leidy himself, who, describing a specimen of Cimoliasaurus, had also reversed the vertebral column. Marsh later claimed that the affair was the cause of his rivalry with Cope: "he has since been my bitter enemy". Both Cope and Marsh in their rivalry named many plesiosaur genera and species, most of which are today considered invalid.

Around the turn of the century, most plesiosaur research was done by a former student of Marsh, Professor Samuel Wendell Williston. In 1914, Williston published his Water reptiles of the past and present. Despite treating sea reptiles in general, it would for many years remain the most extensive general text on plesiosaurs. In 2013, a first modern textbook was being prepared by Olivier Rieppel. During the middle of the twentieth century, the USA remained an important centre of research, mainly through the discoveries of Samuel Paul Welles.

=== Recent discoveries ===
Whereas during the nineteenth and most of the twentieth century, new plesiosaurs were described at a rate of three or four novel genera each decade, the pace suddenly picked up in the 1990s, with seventeen plesiosaurs being discovered in this period. The tempo of discovery accelerated in the early twenty-first century, with about three or four plesiosaurs being named each year. This implies that about half of the known plesiosaurs are relatively new to science, a result of a far more intense field research. Some of this is taking place away from the traditional areas, e.g. in new sites developed in New Zealand, Argentina, Chile, Norway, Japan, China and Morocco, but the locations of the more original discoveries have proven to be still productive, with important new finds in England and Germany. Some of the new genera are a renaming of already known species, which were deemed sufficiently different to warrant a separate genus name.

In 2002, the "Monster of Aramberri" was announced to the press. Discovered in 1982 at the village of Aramberri, in the northern Mexican state of Nuevo León, it was originally classified as a dinosaur. The specimen is actually a very large plesiosaur, possibly reaching 15 m (49 ft) in length. The media published exaggerated reports claiming it was 25 metres (82 ft) long, and weighed up to 150,000 kilograms (330,000 lb), which would have made it among the largest predators of all time.

In 2004, what appeared to be a completely intact juvenile plesiosaur was discovered, by a local fisherman, at Bridgwater Bay National Nature Reserve in Somerset, UK. The fossil, dating from 180 million years ago as indicated by the ammonites associated with it, measured 1.5 metres (4 ft 11 in) in length, and may be related to Rhomaleosaurus. It is probably the best preserved specimen of a plesiosaur yet discovered.

In 2005, the remains of three plesiosaurs (Dolichorhynchops herschelensis) discovered in the 1990s near Herschel, Saskatchewan were found to be a new species, by Dr. Tamaki Sato, a Japanese vertebrate paleontologist.

In 2006, a combined team of American and Argentinian investigators (the latter from the Argentinian Antarctic Institute and the La Plata Museum) found the skeleton of a juvenile plesiosaur measuring 1.5 metres (4 ft 11 in) in length on Vega Island in Antarctica. The fossil is currently on display at the geological museum of South Dakota School of Mines and Technology.

In 2008, fossil remains of an undescribed plesiosaur that was named Predator X, now known as Pliosaurus funkei, were unearthed in Svalbard. It had a length of 12 m (39 ft), and its bite force of 149 kilonewtons (33,000 lb_{f}) is one of the most powerful known.

In December 2017, a large skeleton of a plesiosaur was found on the continent of Antarctica, the oldest creature on the continent, and the first of its species from Antarctica.

== Evolution ==
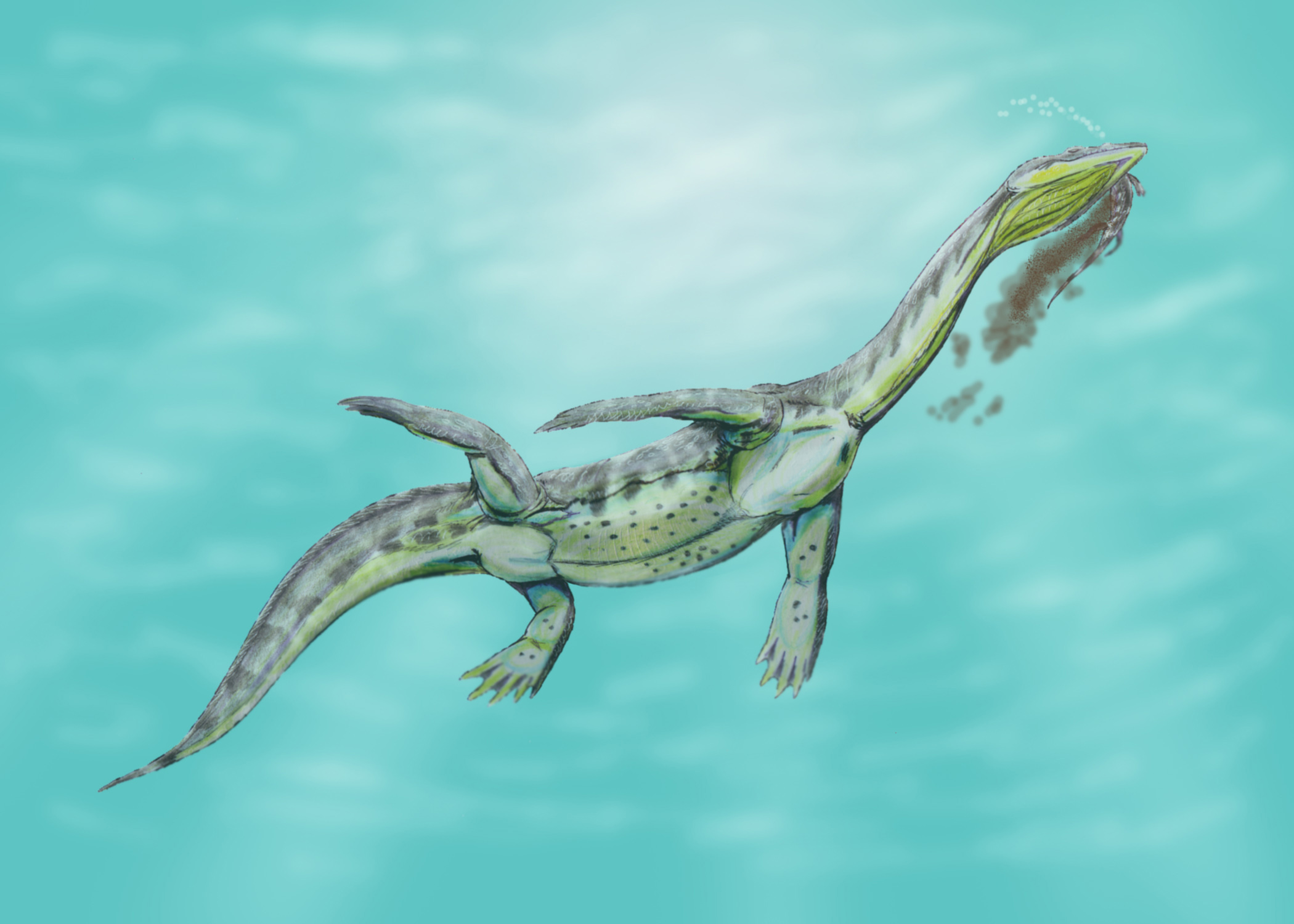
Nothosaurs still had functional legs.

The Plesiosauria have their origins within the Sauropterygia, a group of perhaps archelosaurian reptiles that returned to the sea. An advanced sauropterygian subgroup, the carnivorous Eusauropterygia with small heads and long necks, split into two branches during the Upper Triassic. One of these, the Nothosauroidea, kept functional elbow and knee joints; but the other, the Pistosauria, became more fully adapted to a sea-dwelling lifestyle. Their vertebral column became stiffer and the main propulsion while swimming no longer came from the tail but from the limbs, which changed into flippers. The Pistosauria became warm-blooded and viviparous, giving birth to live young. Early, basal, members of the group, traditionally called "pistosaurids", were still largely coastal animals. Their shoulder girdles remained weak, their pelves could not support the power of a strong swimming stroke, and their flippers were blunt. Later, a more advanced pistosaurian group split off: the Plesiosauria. These had reinforced shoulder girdles, flatter pelves, and more pointed flippers. Other adaptations allowing them to colonise the open seas included stiff limb joints; an increase in the number of phalanges of the hand and foot; a tighter lateral connection of the finger and toe phalanx series, and a shortened tail.

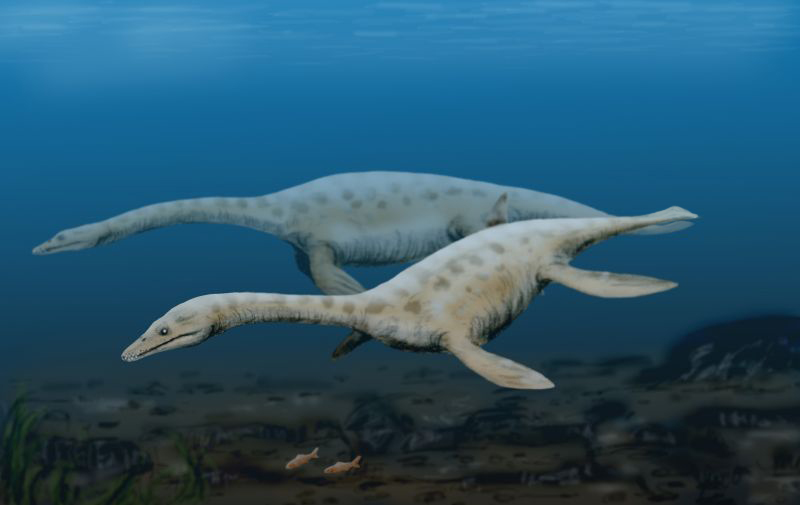
Basal Pistosauria, like Augustasaurus, already bore a strong resemblance to Plesiosauria.

From the earliest Jurassic, the Hettangian stage, a rich radiation of plesiosaurs is known, implying that the group must already have diversified in the Late Triassic; of this diversification, however, only a few (very) basal forms have been discovered, the most derived Rhaeticosaurus. The subsequent evolution of the plesiosaurs is very contentious. The various cladistic analyses have not resulted in a consensus about the relationships between the main plesiosaurian subgroups. Traditionally, plesiosaurs have been divided into the long-necked Plesiosauroidea and the short-necked Pliosauroidea. However, modern research suggests that some generally long-necked groups might have had short-necked members. To avoid confusion between the phylogeny, the evolutionary relationships, and the morphology, the way the animal is built, long-necked forms are therefore called "plesiosauromorph" and short-necked forms are called "pliosauromorph", without the "plesiosauromorph" species necessarily being more closely related to each other than to the "pliosauromorph" forms.

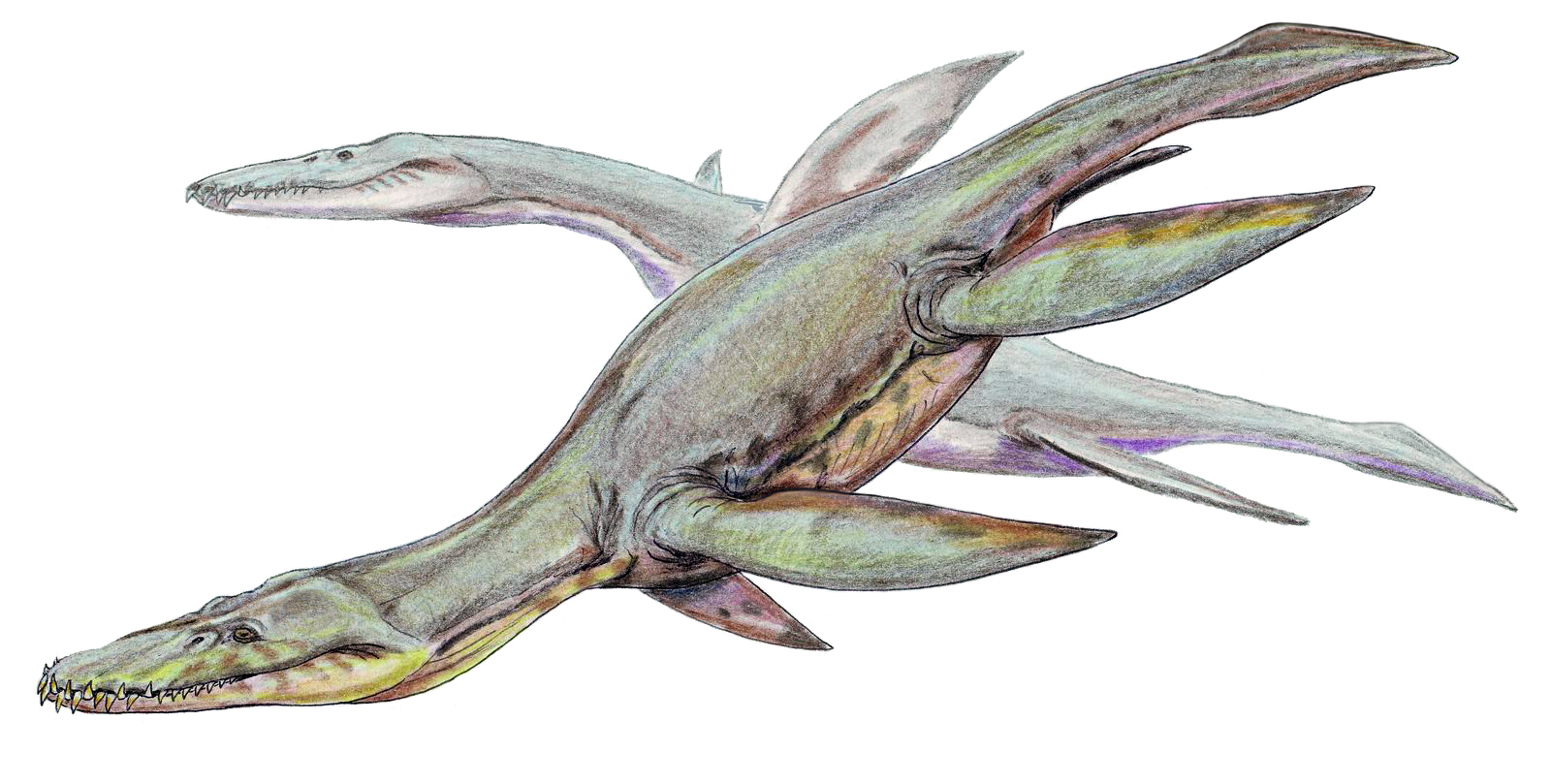
Illustration of the pliosaur Simolestes vorax

The latest common ancestor of the Plesiosauria was probably a rather small short-necked form. During the earliest Jurassic, the subgroup with the most species was the Rhomaleosauridae, a possibly very basal split-off of species which were also short-necked. Plesiosaurs in this period were at most five meters (sixteen feet) long. By the Toarcian, about 180 million years ago, other groups, among them the Plesiosauridae, became more numerous and some species developed longer necks, resulting in total body lengths of up to ten metres (33 feet).

In the middle of the Jurassic, very large Pliosauridae evolved. These were characterized by a large head and a short neck, such as Liopleurodon and Simolestes. These forms had skulls up to three meters (ten feet) long and reached a length of up to seventeen meters (56 feet) and a weight of ten tons. The pliosaurids had large, conical teeth and were the dominant marine carnivores of their time. During the same time, approximately 160 million years ago, the Cryptoclididae were present, shorter species with a long neck and a small head.

The Leptocleididae radiated during the Early Cretaceous. These were rather small forms that, despite their short necks, might have been more closely related to the Plesiosauridae than to the Pliosauridae. Later in the Early Cretaceous, the Elasmosauridae appeared; these were among the longest plesiosaurs, reaching up to fifteen meters (fifty feet) in length due to very long necks containing as many as 76 vertebrae, more than any other known vertebrate. Pliosauridae were still present as is shown by large predators, such as Kronosaurus.

At the beginning of the Late Cretaceous, pliosaurids became extinct and were replaced by the Polycotylidae, which had short necks and peculiarly elongated heads with narrow snouts. During the Late Cretaceous, the elasmosaurids still had many species.

All plesiosaurs became extinct as a result of the K-T event at the end of the Cretaceous period, approximately 66 million years ago.

=== Relationships ===
In modern phylogeny, clades are defined groups that contain all species belonging to a certain branch of the evolutionary tree. One way to define a clade is to let it consist of the last common ancestor of two such species and all its descendants. Such a clade is called a "node clade". In 2008, Patrick Druckenmiller and Anthony Russell in this way defined Plesiosauria as the group consisting of the last common ancestor of Plesiosaurus dolichocheirus and Peloneustes philarchus and all its descendants. Plesiosaurus and Peloneustes represented the main subgroups of the Plesiosauroidea and the Pliosauroidea and were chosen for historical reasons; any other species from these groups would have sufficed.

Another way to define a clade is to let it consist of all species more closely related to a certain species that one in any case wishes to include in the clade than to another species that one to the contrary desires to exclude. Such a clade is called a "stem clade". Such a definition has the advantage that it is easier to include all species with a certain morphology. Plesiosauria was in 2010 by Hillary Ketchum and Roger Benson defined as such a stem-based taxon: "all taxa more closely related to Plesiosaurus dolichodeirus and Pliosaurus brachydeirus than to Augustasaurus hagdorni". Ketchum and Benson (2010) also coined a new clade Neoplesiosauria, a node-based taxon that was defined by as "Plesiosaurus dolichodeirus, Pliosaurus brachydeirus, their most recent common ancestor and all of its descendants". The clade Neoplesiosauria very likely is materially identical to Plesiosauria sensu Druckenmiller & Russell, thus would designate exactly the same species, and the term was meant to be a replacement of this concept.

Benson et al. (2012) found the traditional Pliosauroidea to be paraphyletic in relation to Plesiosauroidea. Rhomaleosauridae was found to be outside Neoplesiosauria, but still within Plesiosauria. The early Carnian pistosaur Bobosaurus was found to be one step more advanced than Augustasaurus in relation to the Plesiosauria and therefore it represented by definition the basalmost known plesiosaur. This analysis focused on basal plesiosaurs and therefore only one derived pliosaurid and one cryptoclidian were included, while elasmosaurids were not included at all. A more detailed analysis published by both Benson and Druckenmiller in 2014 was not able to resolve the relationships among the lineages at the base of Plesiosauria.

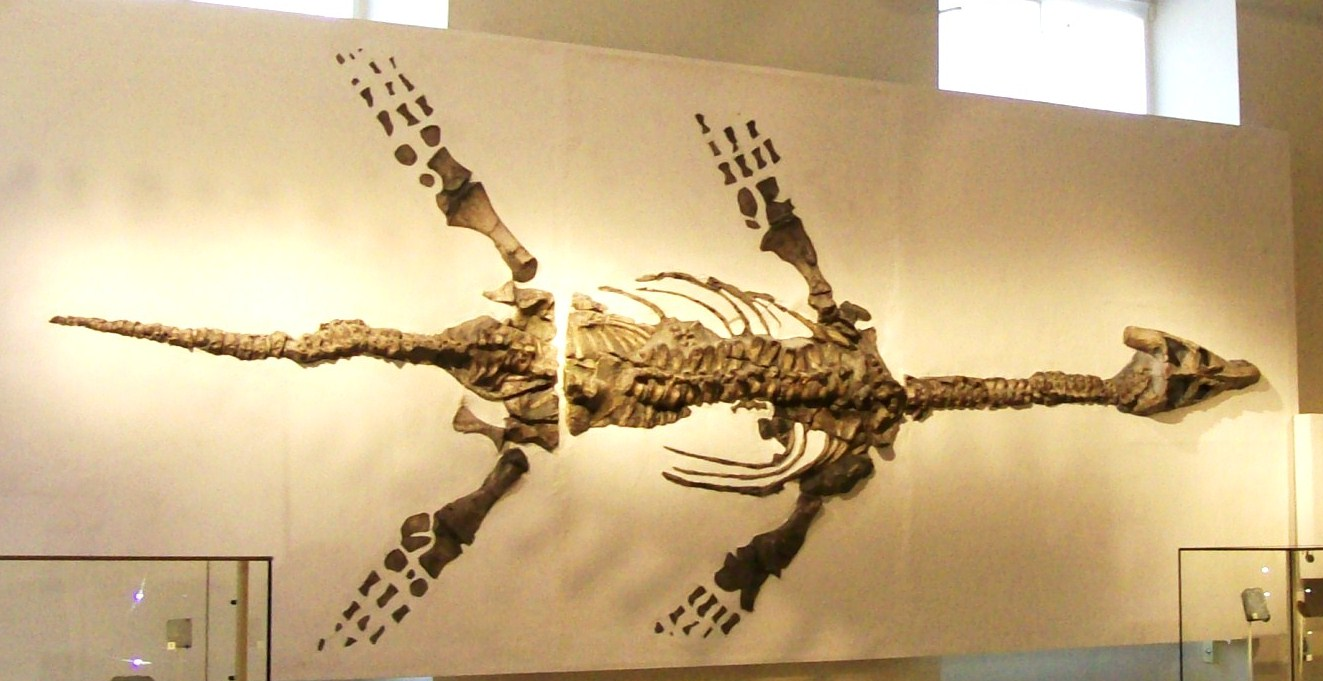
Atychodracon fossil

The following cladogram follows an analysis by Benson & Druckenmiller (2014).

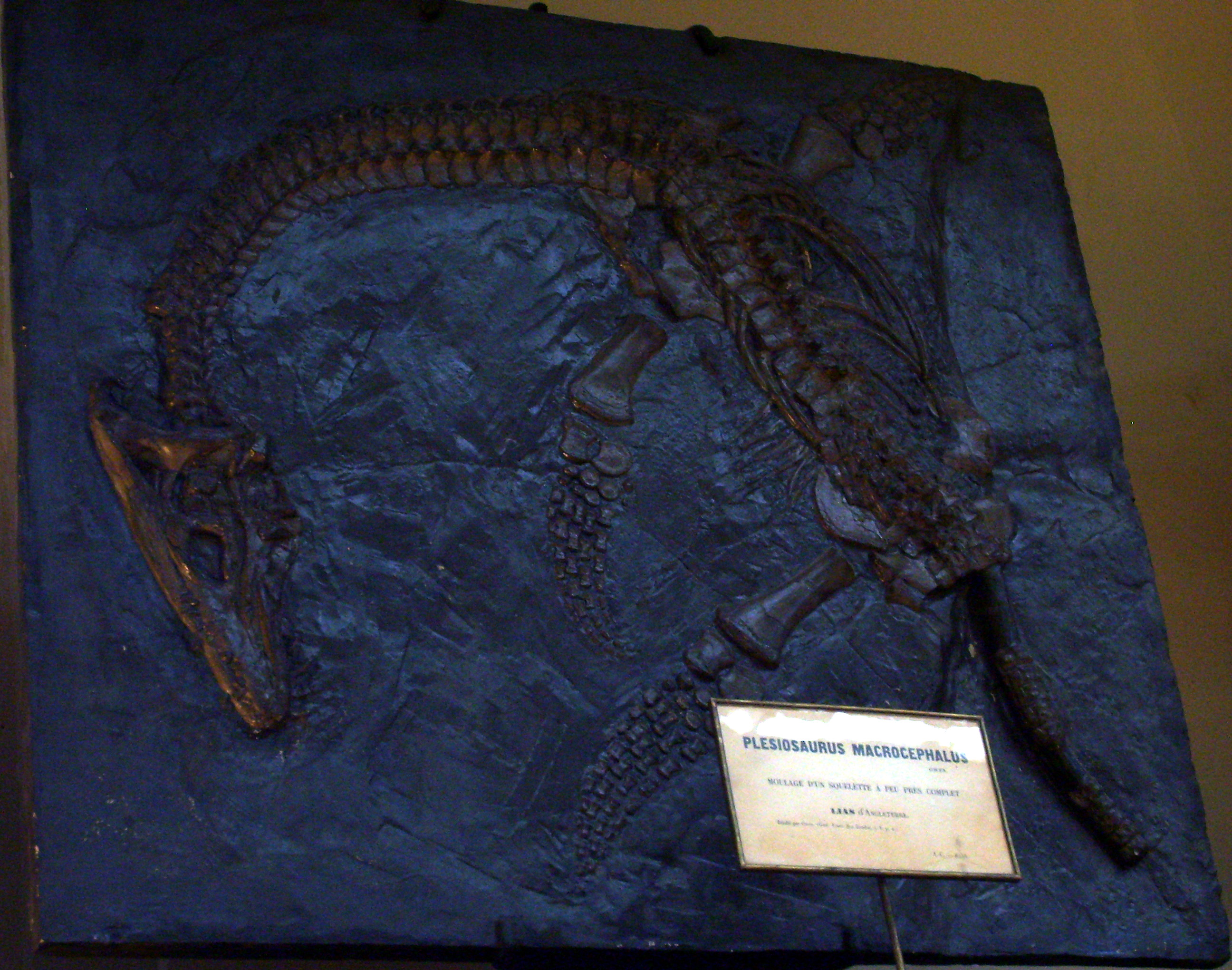
Cast of "Plesiosaurus" macrocephalus, yet to receive a valid genus name

- - "Pistosaurus" postcranium
  - Yunguisaurus
  - - Augustasaurus
    - - Bobosaurus
      - Plesiosauria
        - Stratesaurus
        - Eoplesiosaurus
        - Rhomaleosauridae
        - Pliosauridae
          - Thalassiodracon
          - - Hauffiosaurus
            - - Attenborosaurus
              - - Marmornectes
                - Thalassophonea
        - Plesiosauroidea
          - Plesiosaurus
          - - Eretmosaurus
            - Westphaliasaurus
            - Microcleididae
            - - Plesiopterys
              - Cryptoclidia
                - Cryptoclididae
                - Xenopsaria
                  - Elasmosauridae
                  - Leptocleidia
                    - Leptocleididae
                    - Polycotylidae

== Description ==
=== Size ===
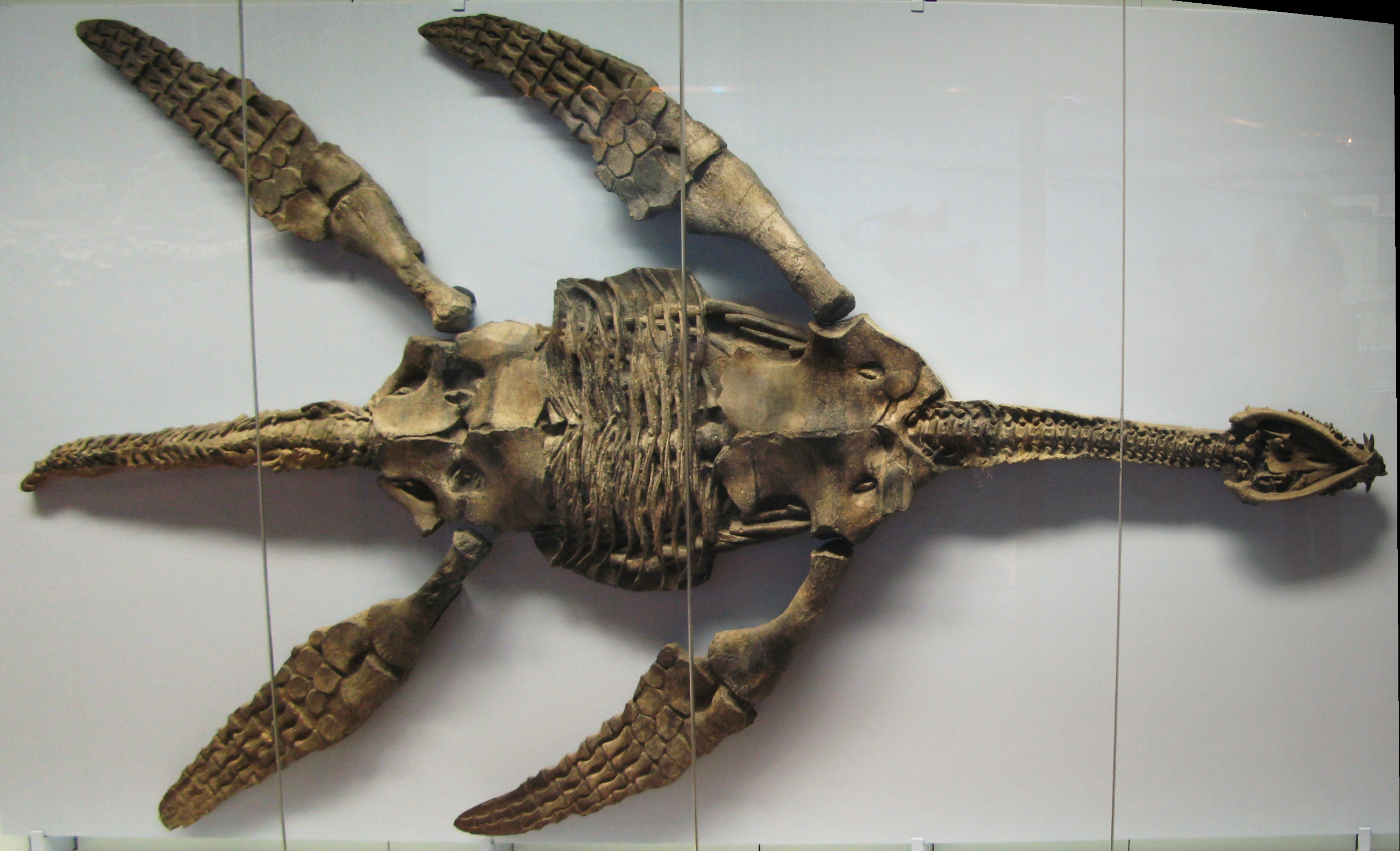
Plesiosaur skeleton of Meyerasaurus in the Museum am Löwentor, Stuttgart, seen from below

In general, plesiosaurians varied in adult length from between 1.5 meters (4.9 ft) to about 15 meters (49 ft). The group thus contained some of the largest marine apex predators in the fossil record, roughly equalling the longest ichthyosaurs, mosasaurids, sharks and toothed whales in size. Some plesiosaurian remains, such as a 2.875-meter-long (9.43 ft) set of highly reconstructed and fragmentary lower jaws preserved in the Oxford University Museum and referable to Pliosaurus rossicus (previously referred to Stretosaurus and Liopleurodon), indicated a length of 17 meters (56 ft). However, it was recently argued that its size cannot be currently determined due to their being poorly reconstructed and a length of 12.7 meters (42 ft) or less is more likely. In 2023, the length of its mandible was estimated to be 2.6m, suggesting a length of 11.8 meters (39 ft) and a weight of over 20 tonnes (20 long tons; 22 short tons). MCZ 1285, a specimen currently referable to Kronosaurus queenslandicus, from the Early Cretaceous of Australia, was estimated to have a skull length of 2.21–2.85 m (7 ft 3 in – 9 ft 4 in). A series of neck vertebrae from the Kimmeridge Clay Formation indicate a pliosaur, probably Pliosaurus, that may have been up to 14.4 meters (47 ft) long. A later estimate suggests a length of 10.7–11.8 m (35–39 ft) for these cervicals, as well as 11.7–13 m (38–43 ft) for another specimen known from an isolated cervical.

=== Skeleton ===
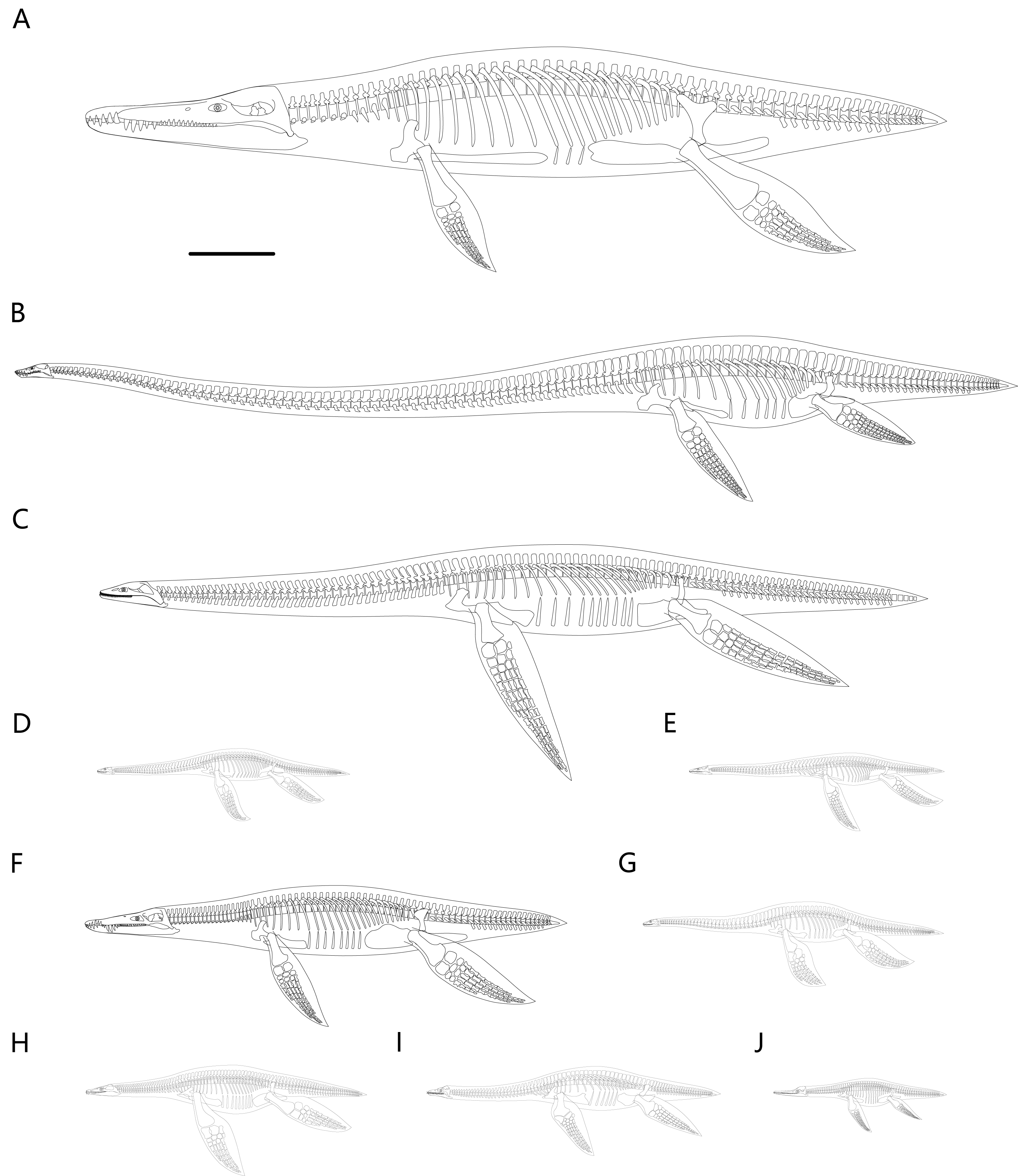
Comparison of various plesiosaur skeletons in side-on view: (A) Kronosaurus. (B) Albertonectes. (C) Aristonectes. (D) Plesiopterys. (E) Brancasaurus. (F) Liopleurodon. (G) Seeleyosaurus. (H) Meyerasaurus. (I) Cryptoclidus . (J) Mauriciosaurus. Scale bar = 1 meter

The typical plesiosaur had a broad, flat, body and a short tail. Plesiosaurs retained their ancestral two pairs of limbs, which had evolved into large flippers. Plesiosaurs were related to the earlier Nothosauridae, that had a more crocodile-like body. The flipper arrangement is unusual for aquatic animals in that probably all four limbs were used to propel the animal through the water by up-and-down movements. The tail was most likely only used for helping in directional control. This contrasts to the ichthyosaurs and the later mosasaurs, in which the tail provided the main propulsion.

To power the flippers, the shoulder girdle and the pelvis had been greatly modified, developing into broad bone plates at the underside of the body, which served as an attachment surface for large muscle groups, able to pull the limbs downwards. In the shoulder, the coracoid had become the largest element covering the major part of the breast. The scapula was much smaller, forming the outer front edge of the trunk. To the middle, it continued into a clavicle and finally a small interclavicular bone. As with most tetrapods, the shoulder joint was formed by the scapula and coracoid. In the pelvis, the bone plate was formed by the ischium at the rear and the larger pubic bone in front of it. The ilium, which in land vertebrates bears the weight of the hindlimb, had become a small element at the rear, no longer attached to either the pubic bone or the thighbone. The hip joint was formed by the ischium and the pubic bone. The pectoral and pelvic plates were connected by a plastron, a bone cage formed by the paired belly ribs that each had a middle and an outer section. This arrangement immobilised the entire trunk.

To become flippers, the limbs had changed considerably. The limbs were very large, each about as long as the trunk. The forelimbs and hindlimbs strongly resembled each other. The humerus in the upper arm, and the femur in the upper leg, had become large flat bones, expanded at their outer ends. The elbow joints and the knee joints were no longer functional: the lower arm and the lower leg could not flex in relation to the upper limb elements, but formed a flat continuation of them. All outer bones had become flat supporting elements of the flippers, tightly connected to each other and hardly able to rotate, flex, extend or spread. This was true of the ulna, radius, metacarpals and fingers, as well of the tibia, fibula, metatarsals and toes. Furthermore, in order to elongate the flippers, the number of phalanges had increased, up to eighteen in a row, a phenomenon called hyperphalangy. The flippers were not perfectly flat, but had a lightly convexly curved top profile, like an airfoil, to be able to "fly" through the water.

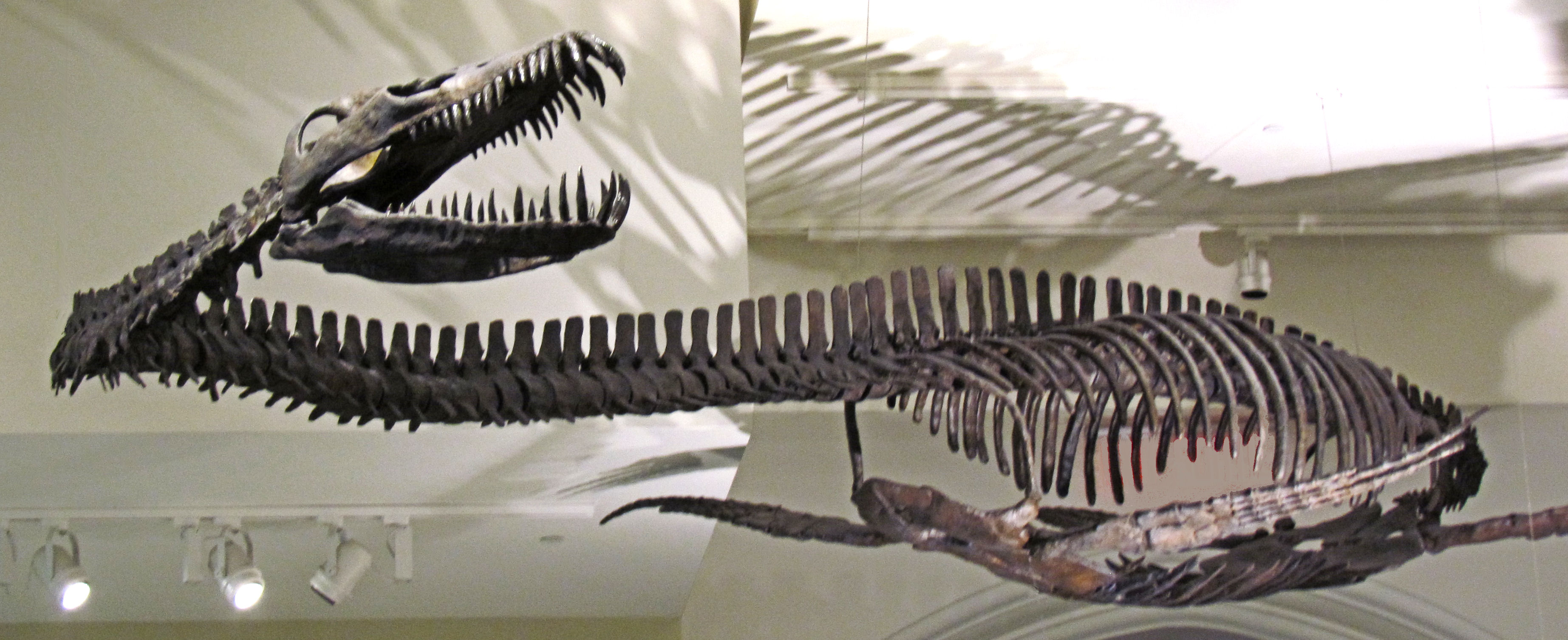
Cast of Traskasaura, Canadian Museum of Nature

While plesiosaurs varied little in the build of the trunk, and can be called "conservative" in this respect, there were major differences between the subgroups as regards the form of the neck and the skull. Plesiosaurs can be divided into two major morphological types that differ in head and neck size. "Plesiosauromorphs", such as Cryptoclididae, Elasmosauridae, and Plesiosauridae, had long necks and small heads. "Pliosauromorphs", such as the Pliosauridae and the Rhomaleosauridae, had shorter necks with a large, elongated head. The neck length variations were not caused by an elongation of the individual cervical vertebrae, but an increase in their number. Elasmosaurus has seventy-two neck vertebrae; the known record is held by the elasmosaurid Albertonectes, with seventy-six cervicals. The large number of joints suggested to early researchers that the neck must have been very flexible; indeed, a swan-like curvature of the neck was assumed to be possible - in Icelandic, plesiosaurs are even called Svaneðlur, "swan lizards". However, modern research has confirmed an earlier conjecture of Williston that the long plate-like spines on top of the vertebrae, the processus spinosi, strongly limited vertical neck movement. Although horizontal curving was less restricted, in general, the neck must have been rather stiff and certainly was incapable of being bent into serpentine coils. This is even more true of the short-necked "pliosauromophs", which had as few as eleven cervical vertebrae. With early forms, the amphicoelous or amphiplat neck vertebrae bore double-headed neck ribs; later forms had single-headed ribs. In the remainder of the vertebral column, the number of dorsal vertebrae varied between about nineteen and thirty-two; of the sacral vertebrae, between two and six, and of the tail vertebrae, between about twenty-one and thirty-two. These vertebrae still possessed the original processes inherited from the land-dwelling ancestors of the Sauropterygia and had not been reduced to fish-like simple discs, as happened with the vertebrae of ichthyosaurs. The tail vertebrae possessed chevron bones. The dorsal vertebrae of plesiosaurs are easily recognisable by two large foramina subcentralia, paired vascular openings at the underside.

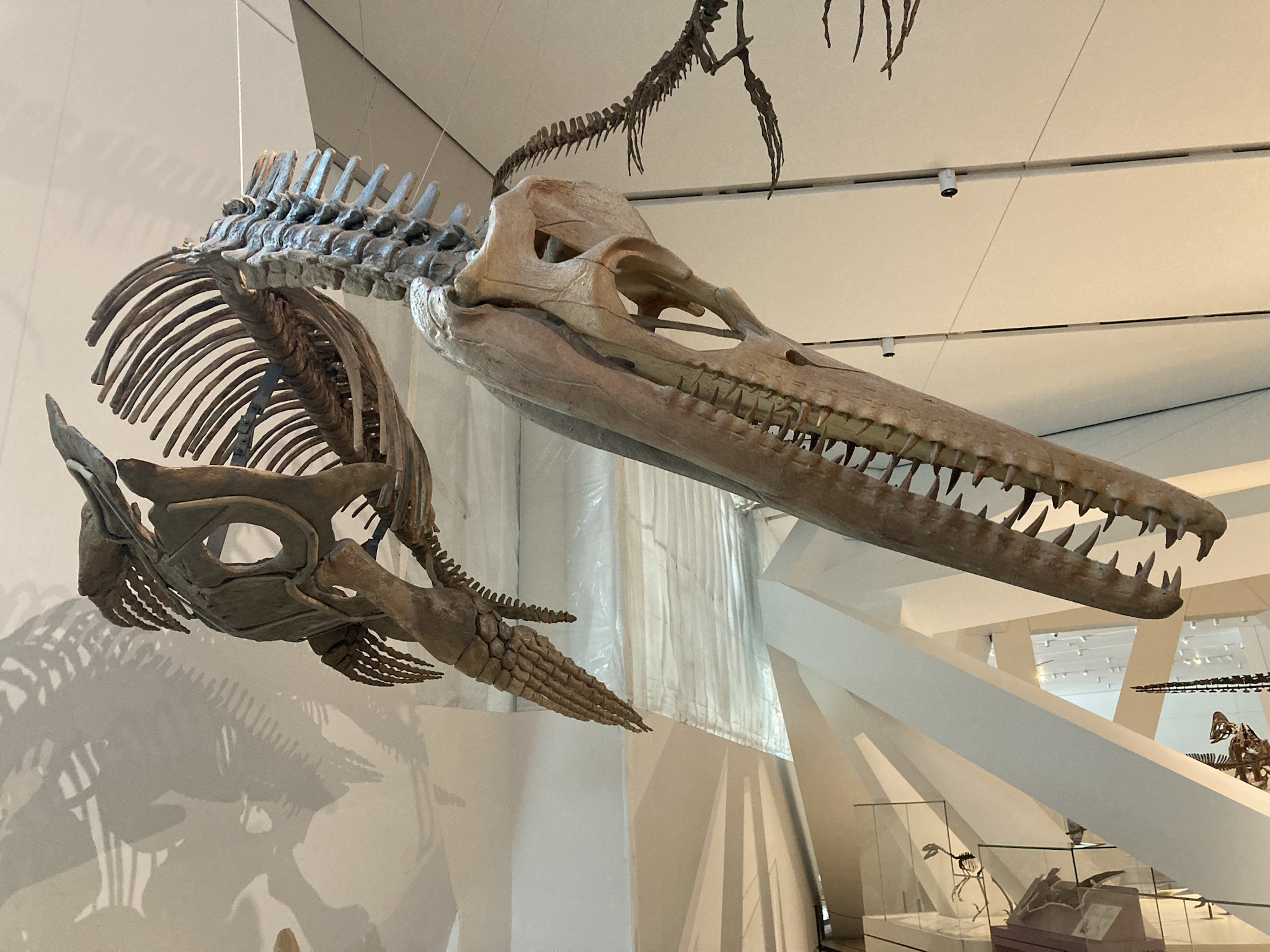
Mounted Trinacromerum, showing skull

The skull of plesiosaurs showed the "euryapsid" condition, lacking the lower temporal fenestrae, the openings at the lower rear sides. The upper temporal fenestrae formed large openings at the sides of the rear skull roof, the attachment for muscles closing the lower jaws. Generally, the parietal bones were very large, with a midline crest, while the squamosal bones typically formed an arch, excluding the parietals from the occiput. The eye sockets were large, in general pointing obliquely upwards; the pliosaurids had more sideways directed eyes. The eyes were supported by scleral rings, the form of which shows that they were relatively flat, an adaptation to diving. The anteriorly placed internal nostrils, the choanae, have palatal grooves to channel water, the flow of which would be maintained by hydrodynamic pressure over the posteriorly placed, in front of the eye sockets, external nares during swimming. According to one hypothesis, during its passage through the nasal ducts, the water would have been 'smelled' by olfactory epithelia. However, more to the rear, a second pair of openings is present in the palate; a later hypothesis holds that these are the real choanae and the front pair in reality represented paired salt glands. The distance between the eye sockets and the nostrils was so limited because the nasal bones were strongly reduced, even absent in many species. The premaxillae directly touched the frontal bones; in the elasmosaurids, they even reached back to the parietal bones. Often, the lacrimal bones were also lacking.

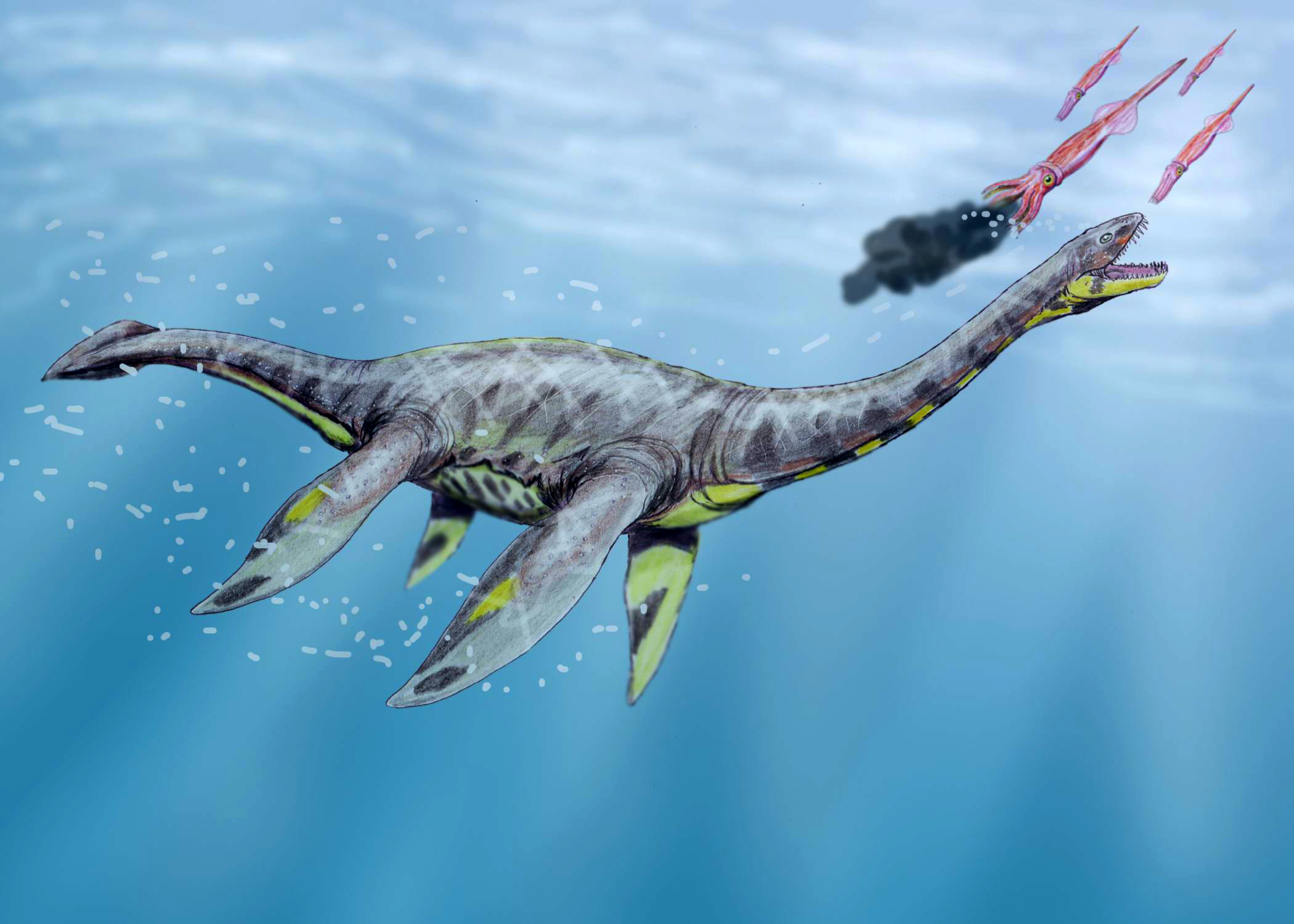
Seeleyosaurus with a tail fin

The tooth form and number was very variable. Some forms had hundreds of needle-like teeth. Most species had larger conical teeth with a round or oval cross-section. Such teeth numbered four to six in the premaxilla and about fourteen to twenty-five in the maxilla; the number in the lower jaws roughly equalled that of the skull. The teeth were placed in tooth-sockets, had vertically wrinkled enamel and lacked a true cutting edge or carina. With some species, the front teeth were notably longer, to grab prey.

=== Soft tissues ===
Soft tissue remains of plesiosaurs are rare, but sometimes, especially in shale deposits, they have been partly preserved, e.g. showing the outlines of the body. An early discovery in this respect was the holotype of Plesiosaurus conybeari (presently Attenborosaurus). From such finds it is known that the skin was smooth, without apparent scales but with small wrinkles (although Frey et al., (2017) reported that Mauriciosaurus had millimetric scale-like structures across the body that they interpret as scales), that the trailing edge of the flippers extended considerably behind the limb bones, and that the tail bore a vertical fin, as reported by Wilhelm Dames in his description of Plesiosaurus guilelmiimperatoris (presently Seeleyosaurus). The possibility of a tail fluke has been confirmed by recent studies on the caudal neural spine form of Pantosaurus, Cryptoclidus and Rhomaleosaurus zetlandicus. A 2020 study claims that the caudal fin was horizontal in configuration. In 2025, a subadult specimen of Plesiopterys (MH 7) from the Lower Jurassic Posidonia Shale (Germany) was reported to have preserved traces of scaly skin on the right front flipper and smooth skin on the tail, with the tail integument also showing preservation of dark-colored melanosomes and keratinocytes.

== Paleobiology ==
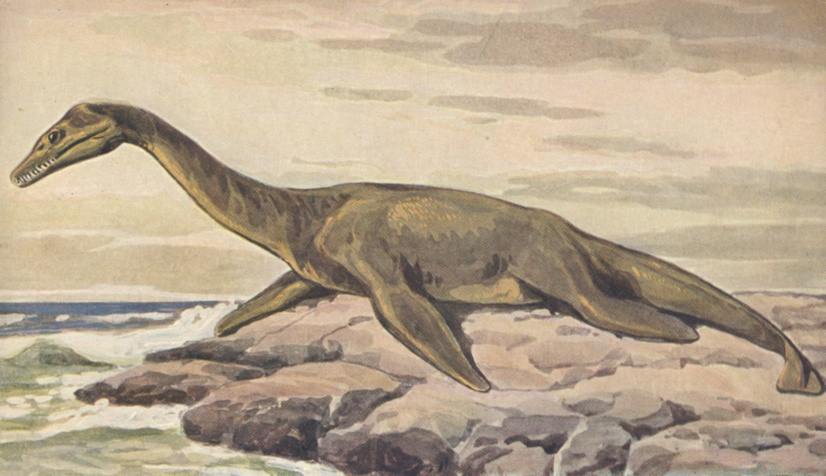
Painting of a plesiosaur on land, by Heinrich Harder

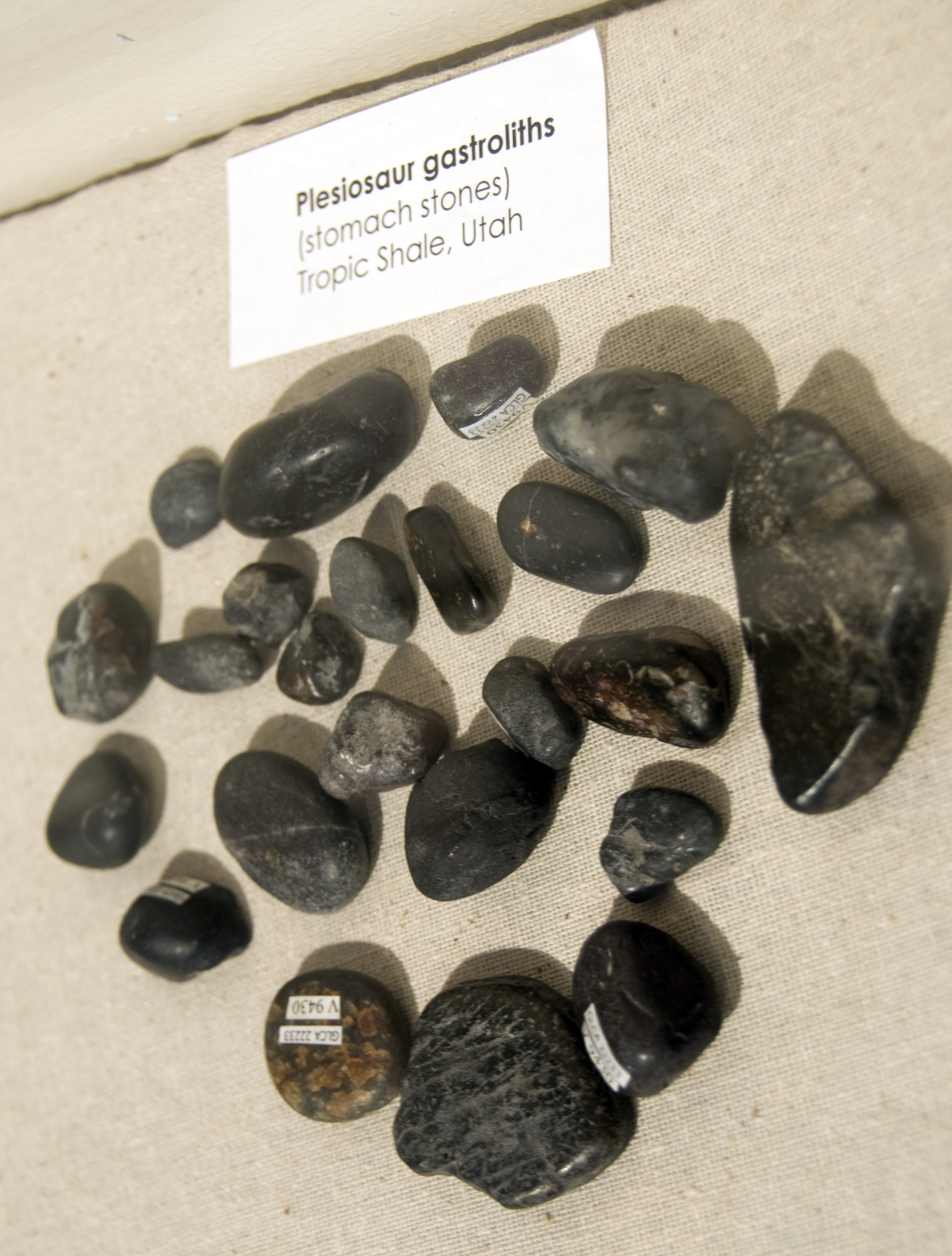
Plesiosaur gastroliths

=== Food ===
The probable food source of plesiosaurs varied depending on whether they belonged to the long-necked "plesiosauromorph" forms or the short-necked "pliosauromorph" species.

The extremely long necks of "plesiosauromorphs" have caused speculation as to their function from the very moment their special build became apparent. Conybeare had offered three possible explanations. The neck could have served to intercept fast-moving fish in a pursuit. Alternatively, plesiosaurs could have rested on the sea bottom, while the head was sent out to search for prey, which seemed to be confirmed by the fact the eyes were directed relatively upwards. Finally, Conybeare suggested the possibility that plesiosaurs swam on the surface, letting their necks plunge downwards to seek food at lower levels. All these interpretations assumed that the neck was very flexible. The modern insight that the neck was, in fact, rather rigid, with limited vertical movement, has necessitated new explanations. One hypothesis is that the length of the neck made it possible to surprise schools of fish, the head arriving before the sight or pressure wave of the trunk could alert them. "Plesiosauromorphs" hunted visually, as shown by their large eyes, and perhaps employed a directional sense of olfaction. Hard and soft-bodied cephalopods probably formed part of their diet. Their jaws were probably strong enough to bite through the hard shells of this prey type. Fossil specimens have been found with cephalopod shells still in their stomach. The bony fish (Osteichthyes), which further diversified during the Jurassic, were likely prey as well. A very different hypothesis claims that "plesiosauromorphs" were bottom feeders. The stiff necks would have been used to plough the sea bottom, eating the benthos. This would have been proven by long furrows present in ancients seabeds. Such a lifestyle has in 2017 been suggested for Morturneria. "Plesiosauromorphs" were not well adapted to catching large fast-moving prey, as their long necks, though seemingly streamlined, caused enormous skin friction. Sankar Chatterjee suggested in 1989 that some Cryptocleididae were suspension feeders, filtering plankton. Aristonectes e.g. had hundreds of teeth, allowing it to sieve small Crustacea from the water.

The short-necked "pliosauromorphs" were top carnivores, or apex predators, in their respective foodwebs. They were pursuit predators or ambush predators of various sized prey and opportunistic feeders; their teeth could be used to pierce soft-bodied prey, especially fish. Their heads and teeth were very large, suited to grab and rip apart large animals. Their morphology allowed for a high swimming speed. They too hunted visually.

Plesiosaurs were themselves prey for other carnivores, as shown by bite marks left by a shark that have been discovered on a fossilized plesiosaur fin and the fossilized remains of a mosasaur's stomach contents that are thought to be the remains of a plesiosaur.

Skeletons have also been discovered with gastroliths, stones, in their stomachs, though whether to help break down food, especially cephalopods, in a muscular gizzard, or to vary buoyancy, or both, has not been established. However, the total weight of the gastroliths found in various specimens appears to be insufficient to modify the buoyancy of these large reptiles. The first plesiosaur gastroliths, found with Mauisaurus gardneri (a nomen nudum), were reported by Harry Govier Seeley in 1877. The number of these stones per individual is often very large. In 1949, a fossil of Alzadasaurus (specimen SDSM 451, later renamed to Styxosaurus) showed 253 of them. The size of individual stones is often considerable. In 1991 an elasmosaurid specimen, KUVP 129744, was investigated, containing a gastrolith with a diameter of seventeen centimeters and a weight of 1,300 grams; and a somewhat shorter stone of 1,490 grams. In total, forty-seven gastroliths were present, with a combined weight of 13 kilograms. The size of the stones has been seen as an indication that they were not swallowed by accident, but deliberately, the animal perhaps covering large distances in search of a suitable rock type. The type specimen of Scalamagnus (MNA V10046) is associated with 289 gastroliths, which is unusual in comparison to most polycotylid skeletons that generally lack gastroliths. Ranging from less than 0.1 grams to 18.5 grams, the total mass of the gastroliths was about 518 grams. About three-quarters of the stones weighed less than 2 grams, with the mean mass and median mass of the stones respectively estimated at 1.9 grams and 0.8 grams. The gastroliths had high mean value and variability in sphericity, suggesting that this individual was obtaining its stones from rivers located along the western side of the Western Interior Seaway.

=== Locomotion ===
==== Flipper movement ====
3D animation showing the most likely swimming motions

The distinctive four-flippered body-shape has caused considerable speculation about what kind of stroke plesiosaurs used. The only modern group with four flippers are the sea turtles, which only use the front pair for propulsion. Conybeare and Buckland had already compared the flippers with bird wings. However, such a comparison was not very informative, as the mechanics of bird flight in this period were poorly understood. By the middle of the nineteenth century, it was typically assumed that plesiosaurs employed a rowing movement. The flippers would have been moved forward in a horizontal position, to minimise friction, and then axially rotated to a vertical position in order to be pulled to the rear, causing the largest possible reactive force. In fact, such a method would be very inefficient: the recovery stroke in this case generates no thrust and the rear stroke generates an enormous turbulence. In the early twentieth century, the newly discovered principles of bird flight suggested to several researchers that plesiosaurs, like turtles and penguins, made a flying movement while swimming. This was e.g. proposed by Eberhard Fraas in 1905, and in 1908 by Othenio Abel. When flying, the flipper movement is more vertical, its point describing an oval or "8". Ideally, the flipper is first moved obliquely to the front and downwards and then, after a slight retraction and rotation, crosses this path from below to be pulled to the front and upwards. During both strokes, down and up, according to Bernoulli's principle, forward and upward thrust is generated by the convexly curved upper profile of the flipper, the front edge slightly inclined relative to the water flow, while turbulence is minimal. However, despite the evident advantages of such a swimming method, in 1924 the first systematic study on the musculature of plesiosaurs by David Meredith Seares Watson concluded they nevertheless performed a rowing movement.

During the middle of the twentieth century, Watson's "rowing model" remained the dominant hypothesis regarding the plesiosaur swimming stroke. In 1957, Lambert Beverly Halstead, at the time using the family name Tarlo, proposed a variant: the hindlimbs would have rowed in the horizontal plane but the forelimbs would have paddled, moved to below and to the rear. In 1975, the traditional model was challenged by Jane Ann Robinson, who revived the "flying" hypothesis. She argued that the main muscle groups were optimally placed for a vertical flipper movement, not for pulling the limbs horizontally, and that the form of the shoulder and hip joints would have precluded the vertical rotation needed for rowing. In a subsequent article, Robinson proposed that the kinetic energy generated by the forces exerted on the trunk by the strokes, would have been stored and released as elastic energy in the ribcage, allowing for an especially efficient and dynamic propulsion system.

In Robinson's model, both the downstroke and the upstroke would have been powerful. In 1982, she was criticised by Samuel Tarsitano, Eberhard Frey and Jürgen Riess, who claimed that, while the muscles at the underside of the shoulder and pelvic plates were clearly powerful enough to pull the limbs downwards, comparable muscle groups on the top of these plates to elevate the limbs were simply lacking, and, had they been present, could not have been forcefully employed, their bulging carrying the danger of hurting the internal organs. They proposed a more limited flying model in which a powerful downstroke was combined with a largely unpowered recovery, the flipper returning to its original position by the momentum of the forward moving and temporarily sinking body. This modified flying model became a popular interpretation. Less attention was given to an alternative hypothesis by Stephen Godfrey in 1984, which proposed that both the forelimbs and hindlimbs performed a deep paddling motion to the rear combined with a powered recovery stroke to the front, resembling the movement made by the forelimbs of sea-lions.

In 2010, Frank Sanders and Kenneth Carpenter published a study concluding that Robinson's model had been correct. Frey & Riess would have been mistaken in their assertion that the shoulder and pelvic plates had no muscles attached to their upper sides. While these muscle groups were probably not very powerful, this could easily have been compensated by the large muscles on the back, especially the latissimus dorsi, which would have been well developed in view of the high spines on the backbone. Furthermore, the flat build of the shoulder and hip joints strongly indicated that the main movement was vertical, not horizontal.

==== Gait ====
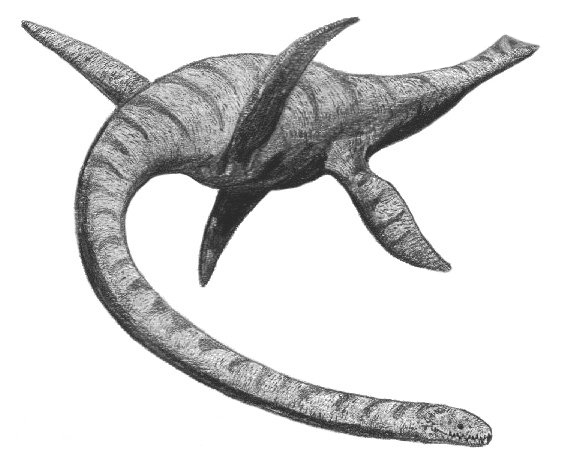
Frey & Riess favoured an "alternating" gait.

Like all tetrapods with limbs, plesiosaurs must have had a certain gait, a coordinated movement pattern of the, in this case, flippers. Of all the possibilities, in practice attention has been largely directed to the question of whether the front pair and hind pair moved simultaneously, so that all four flippers were engaged at the same moment, or in an alternate pattern, each pair being employed in turn. Frey & Riess in 1991 proposed an alternate model, which would have had the advantage of a more continuous propulsion. In 2000, Theagarten Lingham-Soliar evaded the question by concluding that, like sea turtles, plesiosaurs only used the front pair for a powered stroke. The hind pair would have been merely used for steering. Lingham-Soliar deduced this from the form of the hip joint, which would have allowed for only a limited vertical movement. Furthermore, a separation of the propulsion and steering function would have facilitated the general coordination of the body and prevented a too extreme pitch. He rejected Robinson's hypothesis that elastic energy was stored in the ribcage, considering the ribs too stiff for this.

The interpretation by Frey & Riess became the dominant one, but was challenged in 2004 by Sanders, who showed experimentally that, whereas an alternate movement might have caused excessive pitching, a simultaneous movement would have caused only a slight pitch, which could have been easily controlled by the hind flippers. Of the other axial movements, rolling could have been controlled by alternately engaging the flippers of the right or left side, and yaw by the long neck or a vertical tail fin. Sanders did not believe that the hind pair was not used for propulsion, concluding that the limitations imposed by the hip joint were very relative. In 2010, Sanders & Carpenter concluded that, with an alternating gait, the turbulence caused by the front pair would have hindered an effective action of the hind pair. Besides, a long gliding phase after a simultaneous engagement would have been very energy efficient. It is also possible that the gait was optional and was adapted to the circumstances. During a fast steady pursuit, an alternate movement would have been useful; in an ambush, a simultaneous stroke would have made a peak speed possible. When searching for prey over a longer distance, a combination of a simultaneous movement with gliding would have cost the least energy. In 2017, a study by Luke Muscutt, using a robot model, concluded that the rear flippers were actively employed, allowing for a 60% increase of the propulsive force and a 40% increase of efficiency. There would not have been a single optimal phase for all conditions, the gait likely having been changed as the situation demanded.

==== Speed ====
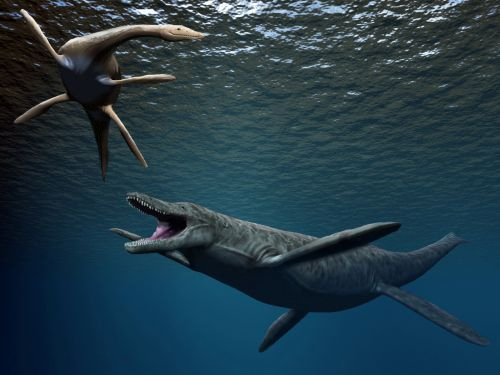
A short-necked pliosaurid like Kronosaurus would have been capable of overtaking a more manoeuvrable long-necked plesiosaur.

In general, it is hard to determine the maximum speed of extinct sea creatures. For plesiosaurs, this is made more difficult by the lack of consensus about their flipper stroke and gait. There are no exact calculations of their Reynolds Number. Fossil impressions show that the skin was relatively smooth, not scaled, and this may have reduced form drag. Small wrinkles are present in the skin that may have prevented separation of the laminar flow in the boundary layer and thereby reduced skin friction.

Sustained speed may be estimated by calculating the drag of a simplified model of the body, that can be approached by a prolate spheroid, and the sustainable level of energy output by the muscles. A first study of this problem was published by Judy Massare in 1988. Even when assuming a low hydrodynamic efficiency of 0.65, Massare's model seemed to indicate that plesiosaurs, if warm-blooded, would have cruised at a speed of four meters per second, or about fourteen kilometers per hour, considerably exceeding the known speeds of extant dolphins and whales. However, in 2002 Ryosuke Motani showed that the formulae that Massare had used, had been flawed. A recalculation, using corrected formulae, resulted in a speed of half a meter per second (1.8 km/h) for a cold-blooded plesiosaur and one and a half meters per second (5.4 km/h) for an endothermic plesiosaur. Even the highest estimate is about a third lower than the speed of extant Cetacea.

Massare also tried to compare the speeds of plesiosaurs with those of the two other main sea reptile groups, the Ichthyosauria and the Mosasauridae. She concluded that plesiosaurs were about twenty percent slower than advanced ichthyosaurs, which employed a very effective tunniform movement, oscillating just the tail, but five percent faster than mosasaurids, which were assumed to swim with an inefficient anguilliform, eel-like, movement of the body.

The many plesiosaur species may have differed considerably in their swimming speeds, reflecting the various body shapes present in the group. While the short-necked "pliosauromorphs" (e.g. Liopleurodon) may have been fast swimmers, the long-necked "plesiosauromorphs" were built more for manoeuvrability than for speed, slowed by a strong skin friction, yet capable of a fast rolling movement. Some long-necked forms, such as the Elasmosauridae, also have relatively short stubby flippers with a low aspect ratio, further reducing speed but improving roll.

==== Diving ====
Few data are available that show exactly how deep plesiosaurs dived. That they dived to some considerable depth is proven by traces of decompression sickness. The heads of the humeri and femora with many fossils show necrosis of the bone tissue, caused by a too rapid ascent after deep diving. However, this does not allow to deduce some exact depth as the damage could have been caused by a few very deep dives, or alternatively by a great number of relatively shallow descents. The vertebrae show no such damage: they were probably protected by a superior blood supply, made possible by the arteries entering the bone through the two foramina subcentralia, large openings in their undersides.

Descending would have been helped by a negative Archimedes Force, i.e. being denser than water. Of course, this would have had the disadvantage of hampering coming up again. Young plesiosaurs show pachyostosis, an extreme density of the bone tissue, which might have increased relative weight. Adult individuals have more spongy bone. Gastroliths have been suggested as a method to increase weight or even as means to attain neutral buoyancy, swallowing or spitting them out again as needed. They might also have been used to increase stability.

The relatively large eyes, neotenic skeletal anatomies and modified shoulder girdles of certain derived cryptoclidids such as Abyssosaurus have been seen as an adaptation to deep diving.

==== Tail role ====
A 2020 study has posited that sauropterygians relied on vertical tail strokes much like cetaceans. In plesiosaurs the trunk was rigid so this action was more limited and in conjunction with the flippers.

=== Metabolism ===
Traditionally, it was assumed that extinct reptile groups were cold-blooded like modern reptiles. New research during the past decades has led to the conclusion that some groups, such as theropod dinosaurs and pterosaurs, were very likely warm-blooded. Whether perhaps plesiosaurs were warm-blooded as well is difficult to determine. One of the indications of a high metabolism is the presence of fast-growing fibrolamellar bone. The pachyostosis with juvenile individuals makes it hard to establish whether plesiosaurs possessed such bone, though. However, it has been possible to check its occurrence with more basal members of the more inclusive group that plesiosaurs belonged to, the Sauropterygia. A study in 2010 concluded that fibrolamellar bone was originally present with sauropterygians. A subsequent publication in 2013 found that the Nothosauridae lacked this bone matrix type but that basal Pistosauria possessed it, a sign of a more elevated metabolism. It is thus more parsimonious to assume that the more derived pistosaurians, the plesiosaurs, also had a faster metabolism. A paper published in 2018 claimed that plesiosaurs had resting metabolic rates (RMR) in the range of birds based on quantitative osteohistological modelling. However, these results are problematic in view of general principles of vertebrate physiology (see Kleiber's law); evidence from isotope studies of plesiosaur tooth enamel indeed suggests endothermy at lower RMRs, with inferred body temperatures of ca. 26 °C (79 °F). Analysis isotopes of oxygen ratio suggests Plesiosauria were poikilothermic endotherms, having a body temperature range of 27–34 °C (81–93 °F).

=== Reproduction ===
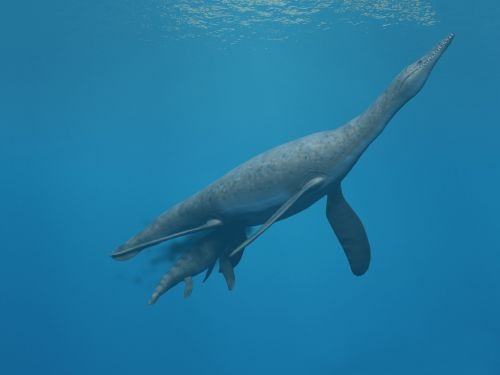
A Polycotylus female giving birth to her single young

As reptiles in general are oviparous, until the end of the twentieth century it had been seen as possible that smaller plesiosaurs may have crawled up on a beach to lay eggs, like modern turtles. Their strong limbs and a flat underside seemed to have made this feasible. This method was, for example, defended by Halstead. However, as those limbs no longer had functional elbow or knee joints and the underside by its very flatness would have generated a lot of friction, already in the nineteenth century it was hypothesised that plesiosaurs had been viviparous. Besides, it was hard to conceive how the largest species, as big as whales, could have survived a beaching. Fossil finds of ichthyosaur embryos showed that at least one group of marine reptiles had borne live young. The first to claim that similar embryos had been found in plesiosaurs was Harry Govier Seeley, who reported in 1887 having acquired a nodule with four to eight tiny skeletons. In 1896, he described this discovery in more detail. If authentic, the embryos of plesiosaurs would have been very small, like those of ichthyosaurs. However, in 1982 Richard Anthony Thulborn showed that Seeley had been deceived by a "doctored" fossil of a nest of crayfish.

An actual plesiosaur specimen found in 1987 eventually proved that plesiosaurs gave birth to live young: This fossil of a pregnant Polycotylus latippinus shows that these animals gave birth to a single large juvenile and probably invested parental care in their offspring, similar to modern whales. The young was 1.5 meters (five feet) long and thus large compared to its mother of five meters (sixteen feet) length, indicating a K-strategy in reproduction. Little is known about growth rates or a possible sexual dimorphism.

=== Social behavior and intelligence ===
From the parental care indicated by the large size of the young, it can be deduced that social behavior in general was relatively complex. It is not known whether plesiosaurs hunted in packs. Their relative brain size seems to be typical for reptiles. Of the senses, sight and smell were important, hearing less so; elasmosaurids have lost the stapes completely. It has been suggested that with some groups the skull housed electro-sensitive organs.

=== Paleopathology ===
Some plesiosaur fossils show pathologies, the result of illness or old age. In 2012, a mandible of Pliosaurus was described with a jaw joint clearly afflicted by arthritis, a typical sign of senescence.

== Distribution ==
Plesiosaur fossils have been found on every continent, including Antarctica.

=== Stratigraphic distribution ===
The following is a list of geologic formations that have produced plesiosaur fossils.

Name	Age	Location	Notes
Agardhfjellet Formation	Tithonian	Norway	Colymbosaurus svalbardensis, Djupedalia, Pliosaurus funkei, Spitrasaurus
Akrabou Formation	Turonian	Morocco	Manemergus, Thililua, Libonectes
Al-Hasa, Phosphorite formation	Campanian-Maastrichtian	Jordan	Plesiosaurus mauritanicus
Allen Formation	Campanian-Maastrichtian	Argentina	
Al-Sawwanah al-Sharqiyah, Phosphate mine	Coniacian-Santonian	Syria	Elasmosauridae
Ampthill Clay Formation	Oxfordian	UK	Liopleurodon pachydeirus
Bearpaw Formation	Campanian	Canada; US	Albertonectes, Dolichorhynchops herschelensis, Terminonatator
Blue Lias Formation	Rhaetian-Hettangian	UK	Anningasaura, Avalonnectes, Eoplesiosaurus, Eurycleidus, "Plesiosaurus" cliduchus, Plesiosaurus dolichodeirus, "Plesiosaurus" macrocephalus, "Rhomaleosaurus" megacephalus, Stratesaurus, Thalassiodracon
Britton Formation	Coniacian	US	Libonectes
Bückeberg Formation	Berriasian	Germany	Brancasaurus, Gronausaurus
Bulldog Shale Formation	Aptian-Albian	Australia	Opallionectes, Umoonasaurus
Calcaire à Bélemnites	Pliensbachian	France	Cryonectes
Carlile Formation	Turonian	US	Megacephalosaurus
Charmouth Mudstone Formation	Sinemurian	UK	Archaeonectrus, Attenborosaurus
Chichali Formation		Pakistan	
Clearwater Formation	Albian	Canada	Nichollssaura, Wapuskanectes
Conway Formation	Campanian-Maastrichtian	New Zealand	Mauisaurus, Alexandronectes
Coral Rag Formation	Oxfordian	UK	"Pliosaurus" grossouvrei
Exter Formation	Rhaetian	Germany	Rhaeticosaurus mertensi, perhaps a basal Pliosaur
Favret Formation	Anisian	US	Augustasaurus
Fencepost limestone	Turonian	US	Trinacromerum
Franciscan Formation		US	
Graneros Shale	Cenomanian	US	Thalassomedon
Greenhorn Limestone	Turonian	US	Brachauchenius, Pahasapasaurus
Guanling Formation	Anisian	China	
Hiccles Cove Formation	Callovian	Canada	Borealonectes
Horseshoe Canyon Formation	Maastrichtian	Canada	Leurospondylus
Jagua Formation	Oxfordian	Cuba	Gallardosaurus, Vinialesaurus
Jagüel Formation	Maastrichtian	Argentina	Tuarangisaurus cabazai
Katiki Formation	Maastrichtian	New Zealand	Kaiwhekea
Kimmeridge Clay	Kimmeridgian	UK	Bathyspondylus, Colymbosaurus, Kimmerosaurus, "Plesiosaurus" manselli, Pliosaurus brachydeirus, Pliosaurus brachyspondylus, Pliosaurus carpenteri, Pliosaurus kevani, Pliosaurus macromerus, Pliosaurus portentificus, Pliosaurus westburyensis
Kingsthorp	Toarcian	UK	Rhomaleosaurus thorntoni
Kiowa Shale	Albian	US	Apatomerus
La Colonia Formation	Campanian	Argentina	Sulcusuchus
Lake Waco Formation		US	
Los Molles Formation	Bajocian	Argentina	Maresaurus
Maree Formation	Aptian	Australia	
Leicestershire	late Sinemurian	UK	Eretmosaurus
Lücking clay pit	early Pliensbachian	Germany	Westphaliasaurus
Marnes feuilletés	Toarcian	France	Occitanosaurus
Mooreville Chalk Formation	Santonian–Campanian	US	
Moreno Formation	Albian	US	Fresnosaurus, Hydrotherosaurus, Morenosaurus
Muschelkalk	Anisian	Germany	Pistosaurus
Naknek Formation	Kimmeridgian	US	Megalneusaurus
Niobrara Formation	Santonian	US	Brimosaurus, Dolichorhynchops osborni, Elasmosaurus, Polycotylus, Styxosaurus snowii
Oxford Clay	Callovian	UK France	Cryptoclidus, Liopleurodon, Marmornectes, Muraenosaurus, Pachycostasaurus, Peloneustes, "Pliosaurus" andrewsi, Picrocleidus, Simolestes, Tricleidus
Oulad Abdoun Basin	late Maastrichtian	Morocco	Zarafasaura
Paja Formation	Aptian	Colombia	Callawayasaurus, Kronosaurus boyacensis
Paso del Sapo Formation	Maastrichtian	Argentina	Aristonectes
Pierre Shale	Campanian	US	Martinectes, Hydralmosaurus
Posidonia Shale	Toarcian	Germany	Hauffiosaurus zanoni, Hydrorion, Meyerasaurus, Plesiopterys, Seeleyosaurus
Rio del Lago Formation	early Carnian	Italy	Bobosaurus
São Gião Formation	Toarcian	Portugal	Lusonectes
Smoky Hill Chalk	Campanian	US	Dolichorhynchops osborni
Sundance Formation	Oxfordian	US	Megalneusaurus, Pantosaurus, Tatenectes
Sundays River Formation	Valanginian	South Africa	Leptocleidus capensis
Tahora Formation	Campanian	New Zealand	Tuarangisaurus keyesi
Tamayama Formation	Santonian	Japan	Futabasaurus
Thermopolis Shale	Albian	US	Edgarosaurus
Toolebuc Formation	Albian	Australia	Eromangasaurus, Kronosaurus queenslandicus
Tropic Shale Formation	Turonian	US	Brachauchenius sp. (unnamed, previously referred to B. lucasi), Scalamagnus, Eopolycotylus, Palmulasaurus, Trinacromerum sp.
Vectis Formation	Aptian	UK	Vectocleidus
Wadhurst Clay Formation	Valanginian	UK	Hastanectes
Wallumbilla Formation	Aptian-Albian	Australia	Styxosaurus glendowerensis
Weald Clay	Barremian	UK	Leptocleidus superstes
Whitby Mudstone Formation	Toarcian	UK	Hauffiosaurus longirostris, Hauffiosaurus tomistomimus, Macroplata, Microcleidus homalospondylus, Microcleidus macropterus, Rhomaleosaurus cramptoni, Rhomaleosaurus propinquus, Rhomaleosaurus zetlandicus, Sthenarosaurus
Wilczek Formation	Norian	Russia	Alexeyisaurus
Xintiangou Formation	Middle Jurassic	China	Yuzhoupliosaurus
Zhenzhuchong Formation		China	
Ziliujing Formation	Toarcian	China	Bishanopliosaurus, Sinopliosaurus

== In contemporary culture ==
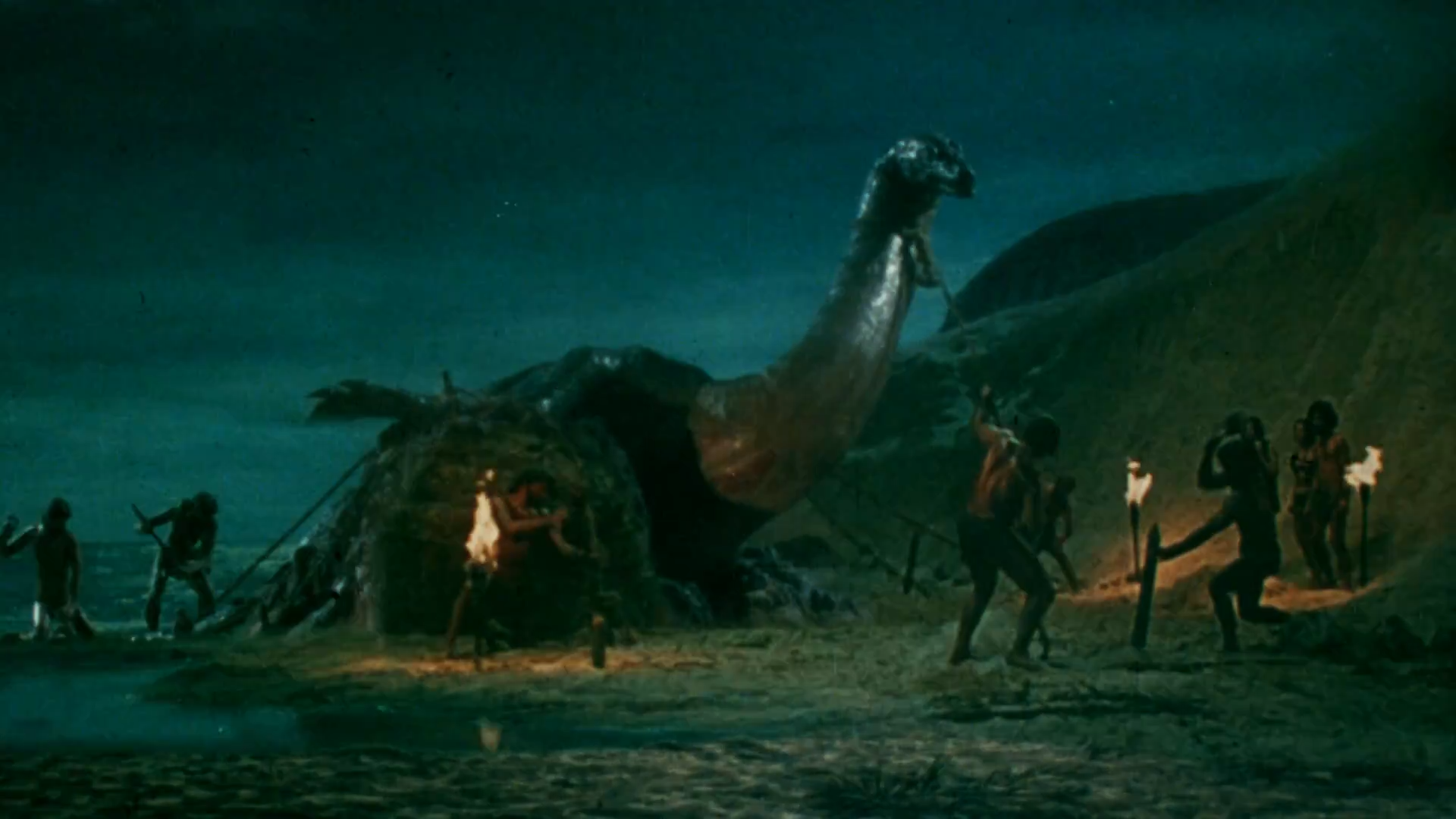
A Plesiosaurus depicted in When Dinosaurs Ruled the Earth

The belief that plesiosaurs are dinosaurs is a common misconception, and plesiosaurs are often erroneously depicted as dinosaurs in popular culture.

It has been suggested that legends of sea serpents and modern sightings of supposed monsters in lakes or the sea could be explained by the survival of plesiosaurs into modern times. This cryptozoological proposal has been rejected by the scientific community at large, which considers it to be based on fantasy and pseudoscience. Purported plesiosaur carcasses have been shown to be partially decomposed corpses of basking sharks instead.

While the Loch Ness monster is often reported as looking like a plesiosaur, it is also often described as looking completely different. A number of reasons have been presented for it to be unlikely to be a plesiosaur. The fact that the osteology of the plesiosaur's neck makes it absolutely safe to say that the plesiosaur could not lift its head like a swan out of water as the Loch Ness monster does, the assumption that air-breathing animals would be easy to see whenever they appear at the surface to breathe, the fact that the loch is too small and contains insufficient food to be able to support a breeding colony of large animals, and finally the fact that the lake was formed only 10,000 years ago at the end of the last ice age, and the latest fossil appearance of plesiosaurs dates to over 66 million years ago. Frequent explanations for the sightings include waves, floating inanimate objects, tricks of the light, swimming known animals and practical jokes. Nevertheless, in the popular imagination, plesiosaurs have come to be identified with the Monster of Loch Ness. This has made plesiosaurs better known to the general public.

== See also ==
- List of plesiosaurs
- List of plesiosaur type specimens
