= Alexeyisaurus =

Alexeyisaurus Temporal range: Late Triassic, 210 Ma

Scientific classification
- Kingdom: Animalia
- Phylum: Chordata
- Class: Reptilia
- Superorder: †Sauropterygia
- Genus: †Alexeyisaurus; Sennikov & Arkhangelsky, 2010
- Species: †A. karnoushenkoi

Binomial name
- †Alexeyisaurus karnoushenkoi Sennikov & Arkhangelsky, 2010

Extinct genus of reptiles

Alexeyisaurus is an extinct genus of possible plesiosaur known from the upper Triassic (lower-middle Norian age) of Wilczek Formation, Wilczek Land, of Franz Josef Land, Russia. It was first named by A. G. Sennikov and M. S. Arkhangelsky in 2010 and the type species is Alexeyisaurus karnoushenkoi. While considered an elasmosaur in the initial publication, it has been described as a "partial, poorly preserved, and undiagnostic sauropterygian skeleton" in subsequent publications.

== See also ==
- Timeline of plesiosaur research
- List of plesiosaur genera
