= Chichali Formation =

Geologic formation in Pakistan

- Stratigraphic range: Early-"Mid Cretaceous"
- Type: Geological formation
- Underlies: Lumshiwal Formation
- Overlies: Samana Suk Formation

Lithology
- Primary: Laterite, glauconitic sandstone, carbonaceous green shale

Location
- Coordinates: 33°49′00″N 72°04′00″E
- Region: Khyber Pakhtunkhwa
- Country: Pakistan
- Extent: Indus Basin; Nizampur Basin
- Chichali Formation (Pakistan)

The Chichali Formation is an Early to "Middle Cretaceous" geologic formation in Pakistan. Plesiosaur remains are among the fossils that have been recovered from its strata. The formation comprises laterites, glauconitic sandstones and carbonaceous green shales deposited on an outer ramp in the Nizampur Basin.

== See also ==
- Plesiosaur stratigraphic distribution
