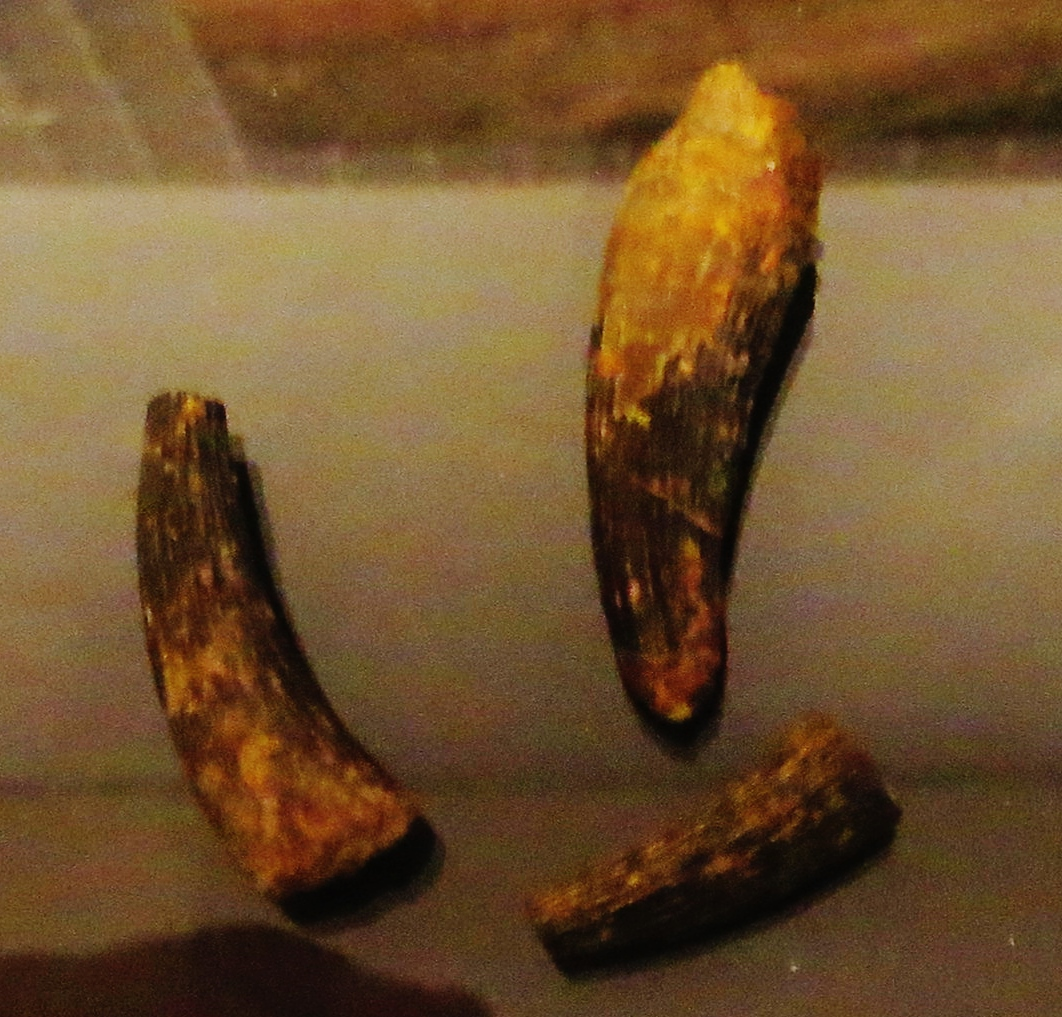
- Teeth of T. albertii

Scientific classification
- Domain: Eukaryota
- Kingdom: Animalia
- Phylum: Chordata
- Class: Reptilia
- Clade: Archosauromorpha
- Clade: Archosauriformes
- Clade: Eucrocopoda
- Clade: Archosauria
- Genus: †Termatosaurus; Meyer & Plieninger, 1844

Type species
- †Termatosaurus albertii Meyer & Plieninger, 1844

Species
- †T. albertii Meyer & Plieninger, 1844 (type); †T. crocodilinus Quenstedt, 1858

= Termatosaurus =

Termatosaurus Temporal range: Late Triassic, 203–201 Ma

Extinct genus of reptiles

Termatosaurus ("End Lizard", due to its appearance in the End Triassic) is a potentially dubious genus of archosaur known from several tooth specimens. Its remains come from the Upper Triassic of France, England, Germany and Switzerland.

Termatosaurus was once thought to have survived until the Early Jurassic, but the attributed Jurassic remains were redescribed as plesiosaur material. Two species are known of this animal: the type species, T. albertii, named by Meyer and T. Plieninger in 1844, and T. crocodilinus, by Quenstedt (1858).

According to Oskar Kuhn, Termatosaurus is a plesiosaur (of the Rhomaleosauridae), while according to other sources, it is a phytosaur.

== Gallery ==
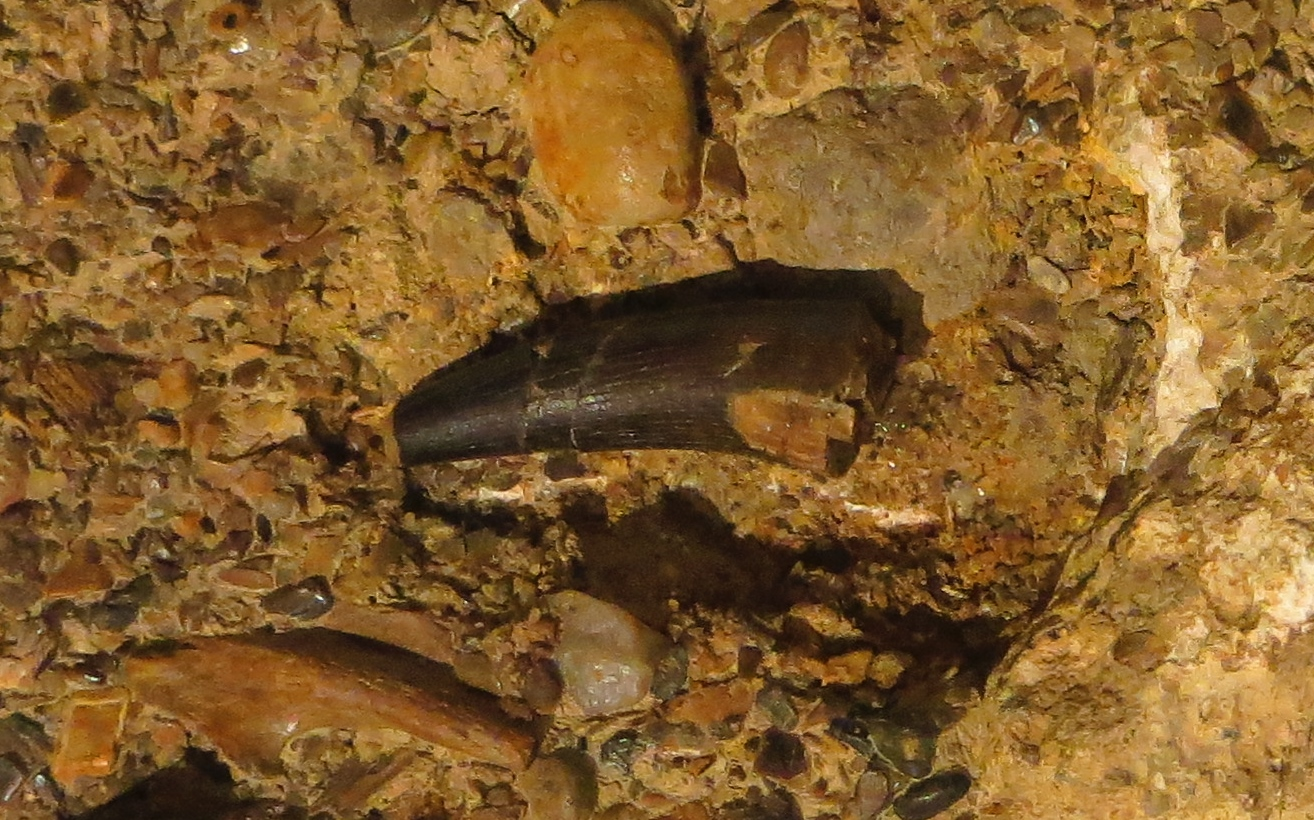
Tooth of T. albertii
