= Boyacasaurus =

Boyacasaurus Temporal range: Early Cretaceous, upper Aptian

Scientific classification
- Kingdom: Animalia
- Phylum: Chordata
- Class: Reptilia
- Superorder: †Sauropterygia
- Order: †Plesiosauria
- Suborder: †Pliosauroidea
- Family: †Pliosauridae
- Subfamily: †Brachaucheninae
- Genus: †Boyacasaurus; Benavides-Cabra et al., 2025
- Species: †B. sumercei

Binomial name
- †Boyacasaurus sumercei Benavides-Cabra et al., 2025

Extinct genus of plesiosaurs

Boyacasaurus (meaning "Boyacá lizard") is an extinct genus of pliosaurid plesiosaurs known from the Early Cretaceous (Aptian age) Paja Formation of Colombia. The genus contains a single species, Boyacasaurus sumercei, known from two fragmentary skulls, both associated with postcranial elements.

== Discovery and naming ==
The two known specimens of Boyacasaurus were discovered in the late twentieth century in outcrops of the Paja Formation in Villa de Leyva, of Boyacá, Colombia. The holotype specimen, accessioned as CFSTA 2–1 in the collections of the Fundación Santa Teresa de Avila, was discovered and collected in the nineties by José Espitia. Consisting of a fragmentary skull (palate and greatly eroded dorsal skull region), the atlas-axis complex (first and second neck vertebrae), weathered vertebrae, and appendicular skeletal fragments, it was found in the 'El Chulo site' in Monsalve Hill. A second specimen referred to Boyacasaurus, MHNS 870 was collected by Peter Creutzberg in 1968 from La Catalina Hill and is housed at the Museo de Historia Natural de la Sabana. It similarly consists of a fragmentary skull (palate, pieces of the skull roof, and the snout) in addition to fragmentary vertebrae and appendicular bones. Several ammonites identified as Cheloniceras (Epicheloniceras) camachoi were found in association with both specimens. Based on biostratigraphy, this indicates a late Aptian age for both fossil sites.

CFSTA 2–1 may belong to a nearly mature individual; while the extensive ossification between skull sutures, as well as the full fusion of the atlas and axis, are indicators of maturity, the front interpterygoid vacuity is long, a feature used to imply a juvenile status in some taxa. In MHNS 870, most of the cranial sutures are ossified, but the medial premaxilla suture is partially open, indicating it was also not fully mature when it died.

In 2025, Cristian D. Benavides-Cabra and colleagues described Boyacasaurus sumercei as a new genus and species of pliosaurid plesiosaurs based on these fossil remains. The generic name, Boyacasaurus, combines a reference to the discovery of both specimens in Boyacá, Colombia, with the Ancient Greek σαῦρος (sauros), meaning "lizard". The specific name, sumercei, is derived from sumercé, a form of address originating from the medieval Spanish expression vuestra merced (lit. 'your grace'), later reduced to su merced and finally sumercé. Linguistic studies describe sumercé as a historically deferential form that, while rooted in medieval systems of address, has remained in active use in the Cundiboyacense Plateau, the region encompassing the type locality, where it today commonly conveys respect, familiarity, or affection across social contexts.

== Classification ==
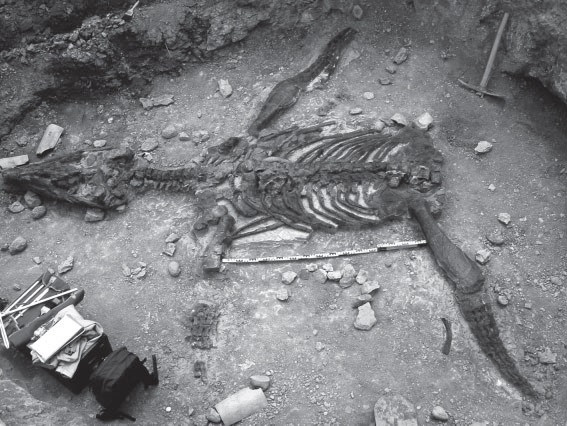
Articulated skeleton of the related Stenorhynchosaurus as found in situ in the Paja Formation

In their phylogenetic analysis, Benavides-Cabra and colleagues (2025) recovered Boyacasaurus as a late-diverging member of the plesiosaur family Pliosauridae in the subfamily Brachaucheninae. This analysis placed Boyacasaurus in a position branching immediately after the basalmost member of this clade, Acostasaurus, but before Stenorhynchosaurus, both of which are known from slightly older layers of the Paja Formation in Colombia. These results are displayed in the cladogram below:

- Pliosauridae
  - Thalassiodracon hawkinsii
  - - Attenborosaurus conybeari
    - - Hauffiosaurus spp.
      - Thalassophonea
        - Marmornectes candrewi
        - - Peloneustes philarchus
          - - Eardasaurus powelli
            - - Anguanax zignoi
              - - Pliosaurus andrewsi
                - - Simolestes vorax
                  - - Gallardosaurus iturraldei
                    - - Liopleurodon ferox
                      - - Pliosaurus spp.
                        - Brachaucheninae
                          - Acostasaurus pavachoquensis
                          - - Boyacasaurus sumercei
                            - - Stenorhynchosaurus munozi
                              - - Luskhan itilensis
                                - - - Megacephalosaurus eulerti
                                    - Brachauchenius spp.
                                  - - Kronosaurus queenslandicus
                                    - - "Monquirasaurus" boyacensis
                                      - Sachicasaurus vitae
