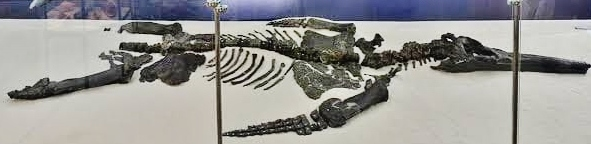
- Holotype skeleton

Scientific classification
- Kingdom: Animalia
- Phylum: Chordata
- Class: Reptilia
- Superorder: †Sauropterygia
- Order: †Plesiosauria
- Suborder: †Pliosauroidea
- Family: †Pliosauridae
- Subfamily: †Brachaucheninae
- Genus: †Luskhan; Fischer et al. 2017
- Species: †L. itilensis

Binomial name
- †Luskhan itilensis Fischer et al., 2017

= Luskhan =

Luskhan Temporal range: Lower Cretaceous, upper Hauterivian, 128 Ma

Extinct genus of reptiles

Luskhan (meaning "water spirit chief") is an extinct genus of large pliosaurid plesiosaurs from the Lower Cretaceous of western Russia. The only known species is L. itilensis, first described in 2017 from a well-preserved and nearly complete skeleton discovered in the Ulyanovsk region. As an early-diverging brachauchenine, Luskhan consequently exhibits an intermediate combination of traits seen in more basal (less specialized) and more derived (more specialized) pliosaurs. However, Luskhan departs significantly from other pliosaurs in that it exhibits a lack of adaptations in its skull to feeding on large prey; its slender snout, small teeth, and short tooth rows instead indicate a skull adapted for feeding on small, soft prey. With these features, it is the pliosaur that approaches closest to the distantly-related piscivorous polycotylids, having convergently evolved these traits more than 10 million years apart.

== Discovery and naming ==
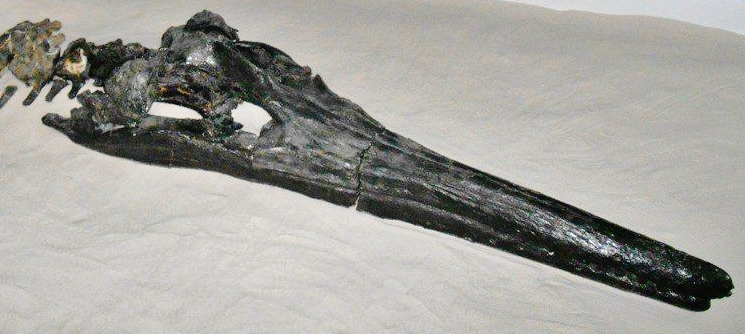
Holotype skull

The holotype and only known specimen of Luskhan consists of an almost complete, three-dimensionally preserved pliosaur skeleton, discovered in 2002 by Russian paleontologist Gleb N. Uspensky on the eastern bank of the Volga River, about 3 km (1.9 mi) north of the village of Slantsevy Rudnik in the Ulyanovsk region of western Russia. Deposits in the region consist of dark grey and slightly sandy shale layers and siltite layers, in which carbonate nodules are embedded. The fossil skeleton was found in the g-5 horizon (layer). After its discovery, the specimen was stored in the I.A. Goncharov Ulyanovsk Regional Museum of Local Lore (YKM), under the specimen number YKM 68344/1_262.

Uspensky co-authored a research paper describing YKM 68344/1_262 that was published in the journal Current Biology on June 5, 2017. Other authors were Valentin Fischer, Roger Benson, Nikolay Zverkov, Laura Soul, Maxim Arkhangelsky, Olivier Lambert, Ilya Stenshin, and Patrick Druckenmiller. They recognized the specimen as beloging to a new genus and species, Luskhan itilensis. The genus name, Luskhan, is derived from luuses, water spirits and masters of water in Mongolian and Turkic mythology, combined with the suffix khan, meaning "chief". Itil is the ancient Turkic name for the Volga River, hence the species epithet itilensis means "of the Volga River". The authors note that this scientific name was chosen because the Volga region was the heart of the Golden Horde during the Mongol Empire.

== Description ==
Size comparison of the holotype

The holotype of Luskhan measures 6.5 m (21 ft) long. At the end of a relatively short neck, the long skull tapers to an elongate snout, which is longer than the region of the skull behind the eyes, as in other members of the Brachaucheninae. It has a lower jaw 1.59 m (5.2 ft) long. Additional characteristics typical of brachauchenines include the parietal bone extending forward to the position of the nostrils; the snout being unconstricted, but bearing an expansion on the bottom surface like Megacephalosaurus; the retroarticular process at the back of the lower jaw being inturned; the teeth in the upper jaw being equally-sized; the facets that articulate with the cervical ribs on the cervical vertebrae being placed relatively high, similar to Kronosaurus and Brachauchenius but unlike Jurassic pliosaurs and other plesiosaurs; the transverse processes attaching to the dorsal vertebrae above the level of the neural canals; and the long coracoid measuring 2.3 times the length of the scapula (2.5 in Kronosaurus).

Luskhan also exhibits some more "primitive" traits which resemble non-brachauchenine thalassophoneans, consistent with it being among the earliest brachauchenines. Like Pliosaurus, the squamosal bones overlap the rear processes of the jugal bones; it also excludes them, as in most plesiosaurs, from the border of the temporal fenestrae. There is also a bulb on each squamosal, as well as a ridge extending upwards from the rear surface. As in Pliosaurus westburyensis, the processes of the pterygoid bones that articulate with the quadrate bone are thick, and there is a U-shaped notch on the bottom of the supraoccipital bone. The flanges on the bottom of the pterygoids come into contact with each other at the midline of the skull. On the bottom of the cervicals, there are large foramina, or pits. The number of cervical vertebrae in Luskhan (14) can be seen as intermediate between Pliosaurus (18) and Brachauchenius (12).

Unusually, Luskhan also lacks many of the adaptations for hunting large prey seen in other brachauchenines: the snout is very thin; there is no keel on the bottom of the fused symphysis of the lower jaw; there is no diastema (or gap in the tooth row); the bones of the upper jaw (the premaxilla and maxilla) are expanded outwards; and there are no caniniform ("canine-like") teeth. The length of the symphysis as a proportion of the overall length of the lower jaw (34%) is also longer than brachauchenines and thalassophoneans, but instead is within the range of the symphyses of the distantly-related Polycotylidae. Also like polycotylids, the teeth are more widely spaced and terminate further forward on the jaw, below the midpoint of the eye socket. As in Dolichorhynchops, the arch of the squamosal is angled further forwards than thalassophoneans.

=== Autapomorphies ===
A number of unique characters, or autapomorphies, set Luskhan apart from all other plesiosaurs. The number of teeth in the premaxilla of the taxon is ambiguous, being reported as either six or seven. The first of these is procumbent (angled forwards) such that it is nearly horizontal, and the space between it and the subsequent tooth is also widened. A roughened, hook-like projection develops on the squamosal from its suture with the quadrate. At the back of the skull, the exoccipital bones enclose the bottom of the foramen magnum, thereby excluding the basioccipital bone. The plate-like lamellae of the pterygoids bear deep grooves on their outer surfaces. On the atlas (the first cervical), the intercentrum is swollen and has a ridge underneath; meanwhile, the bottom of the axis (the second cervical) is covered by a tongue-like projection from the third cervical.

In the shoulder girdle, the projection at the front of the coracoid that points forwards in other plesiosaurs is instead pointed downwards in Luskhan, such that it is perpendicular to the rest of the bone. Unlike other thalassophoneans, but like the Elasmosauridae, the blade of the scapula is relatively short, being only as tall vertically as the longitudinal distance from its base to the articulation with the coracoid. On the humerus, the humeral tuberosity is located above the expansion of the capitulum at the bottom end. The ulna and radius of the front flippers are very small, being only about the same size as the tarsus of the hind flippers; the former of these is longer. Unlike all other pliosaurids, there is no opening (epipodial foramen) where the two bones meet. The fibula is much longer than the tibia; the intermedium of the tarsus contacts only the fibula, and lacks an articulation for the tibia unlike other thalassophoneans and Marmornectes.

== Classification ==
In their 2017 description, Fischer and colleagues placed Luskhan within a cladogram based on a dataset published by Benson and Druckenmiller in 2013 that was previously modified for the description of Makhaira in 2015. Due to the completeness of Luskhan, its position is based on scorings for 74% of the characteristics listed in the dataset. In the strict consensus of the 20,000 most parsimonious phylogenetic trees recovered, Makhaira forms a polytomy with Pliosaurus species, instead of forming a clade with other brachauchenines; however, in the consensus of the 24 most parsimonious trees, it is the most basal brachauchenine, with Luskhan being the next most basal brachauchenine. The 2023 study recovered P. patagonicus as a sister taxon of Luskhan within Brachaucheninae, the phylogenetic analysis of which is reproduced below:

- Pliosauridae
  - Attenborosaurus conybeari
  - - Thalassiodracon hawkinsi
    - - - Hauffiosaurus zanoni
        - Hauffiosaurus tomistomimus
        - Hauffiosaurus longirostris
      - - Anguanax zignoi
        - Marmornectes candrewi
        - Thalassophonea
          - Peloneustes philarchus
          - - "Pliosaurus" andrewsi
            - - Simolestes vorax
              - - Liopleurodon ferox
                - - Gallardosaurus iturraldei
                  - - Pliosaurus almanzaensis
                    - Pliosaurus irgisensis
                    - Pliosaurus rossicus
                    - Pliosaurus brachyspondylus
                    - Pliosaurus macromerus
                    - Pliosaurus brachydeirus
                    - Pliosaurus carpenteri
                    - Pliosaurus westburyensis
                    - Pliosaurus funkei
                    - - Pliosaurus kevani
                      - Pliosaurus cf. kevani
                  - Brachaucheninae
                    - Pliosaurus patagonicus
                    - - Luskhan itilensis
                      - - - Makhaira rossica
                          - Stenorhynchosaurus munozi
                        - - Acostasaurus pavachoquensis
                          - - Sachicasaurus vitae
                            - - Monquirasaurus boyacensis
                              - Kronosaurus-Eiectus
                              - - QM F51291
                                - - Brachauchenius MNA
                                  - Brachauchenius lucasi
                                  - Megacephalosaurus eulerti
                                  - Polyptychodon sp.

=== Evolutionary context ===
Along with Makhaira and Stenorhynchosaurus, Luskhan forms an evolutionary grade that fills a critical gap of 40 million years - from the Berriasian to the Barremian epochs of the Early Cretaceous - in the evolution of brachauchenines. While María Páramo-Fonseca and colleagues, the describers of Stenorhynchosaurus, indicated that including it in the Brachaucheninae would necessitate a re-definition of the clade, Fischer and colleagues did not see this as necessary.

== Paleobiology ==
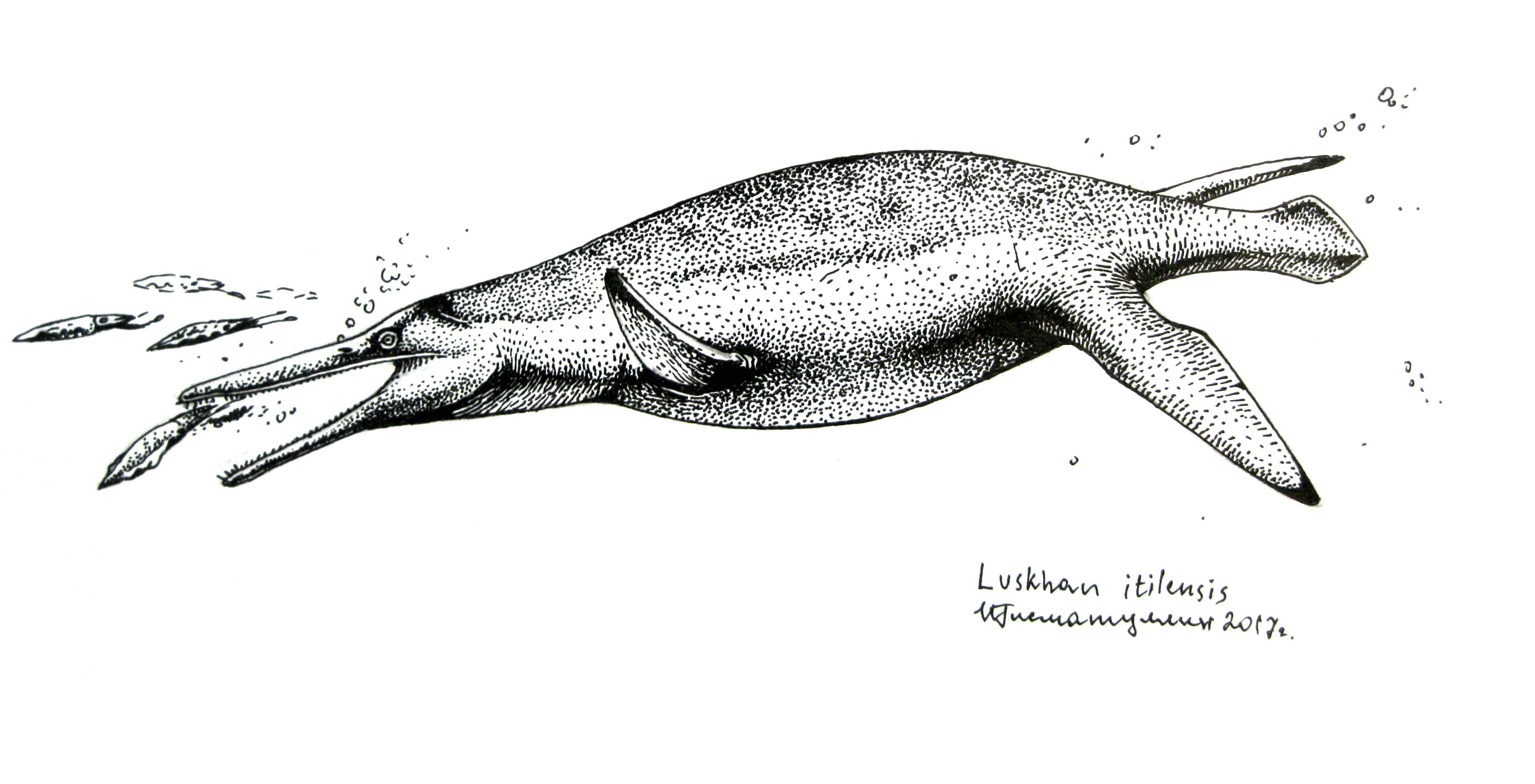
Life restoration

Most thalassophonean pliosaurids, with their robust skulls and short necks, were well-adapted to apex predator niches. Although serrated teeth, spatula-shaped snouts, and strongly-developed crests on the skull roof were lost in brachauchenines, their large size and teeth still indicate predatory lifestyles. Meanwhile, with their slimmer body proportions, polycotylids were likely fast-swimming piscivores. Principal component and ecomorphological analyses place Luskhan as being significantly closer to polycotylids than other thalassophoneans in terms of skull traits, but not in terms of the rest of the body; thus, Luskhan is the most polycotylid-like pliosaurid. The early thalassophonean Peloneustes is also polycotylid-like, but less so than Luskhan.

Ecologically speaking, Luskhan probably preyed on small, soft animals. This is suggested by the slender snout, the long symphysis, and the relatively short tooth row compared to other thalassophoneans. A few traits in Luskhan are shared with typical thalassophoneans, such as the presence of serrations in the rearmost teeth and the presence of weakly trihedral (triangular in cross-section) teeth; however, these are probably vestigial traits retained from Pliosaurus-like ancestors. Thus, Luskhan departed from the typical apex predator niche of thalassophoneans in order to colonize a lower trophic level, having done so independently 10 million years after polycotylids. Makhaira, by contrast, retained a bauplan that is better-suited to being an apex predator; for instance, its teeth are larger than Luskhan.

== Paleoecology ==
Based on the presence of the ammonite Speetoniceras versicolor several meters north of the site where Luskhan was discovered, the g-5 horizon can be correlated with the S. versicolor zone. Magnetostratigraphy indicates that this zone dates to the upper Hauterivian epoch of the early Cretaceous Period, approximately 128 million years ago. Makhaira originates from the S. versicolor zone, and it was found nearby Luskhan as well - 600 metres (2,000 ft) north of Slantsevy Rudnik. Also from the S. versicolor zone is the cryptoclidid plesiosaurid Abyssosaurus, which was found within the region of Chuvashia near a tributary of the Sura River (itself a tributary of the Volga). The ophthalmosaurid ichthyosaur Plutoniosaurus is also known from the locality. In addition to these marine reptiles, fossils of the sauropod dinosaur Volgatitan have been found.

In terms of invertebrates, the S. versicolor zone is additionally characterized by the ammonites S. coronatiforme, S. pavlovae, S. intermedium, and S. polivnense; the bivalves Inoceramus aucella, Prochinnites substuderi, Astarte porrecta, and Thracia creditica; and the belemnites Acroteuthis pseudopanderi, Praeoxyteuthis jasikofiana, Aulacoteuthis absolutiformis, and A. speetonensis. The gastropods Ampullina sp., Avellana hauteriviensis, Claviscala antiqua, Cretadmete neglecta, Eucyclus sp., Hudlestonella pusilla, Khetella glasunovae, Sulcoactaeon sp., Tornatellaea kabanovi, Trilemma russiense, and Turbinopsis multicostulata have also been found within the S. versicolor zone around Ulyanovsk.

== See also ==
- List of plesiosaur genera
- Timeline of plesiosaur research
