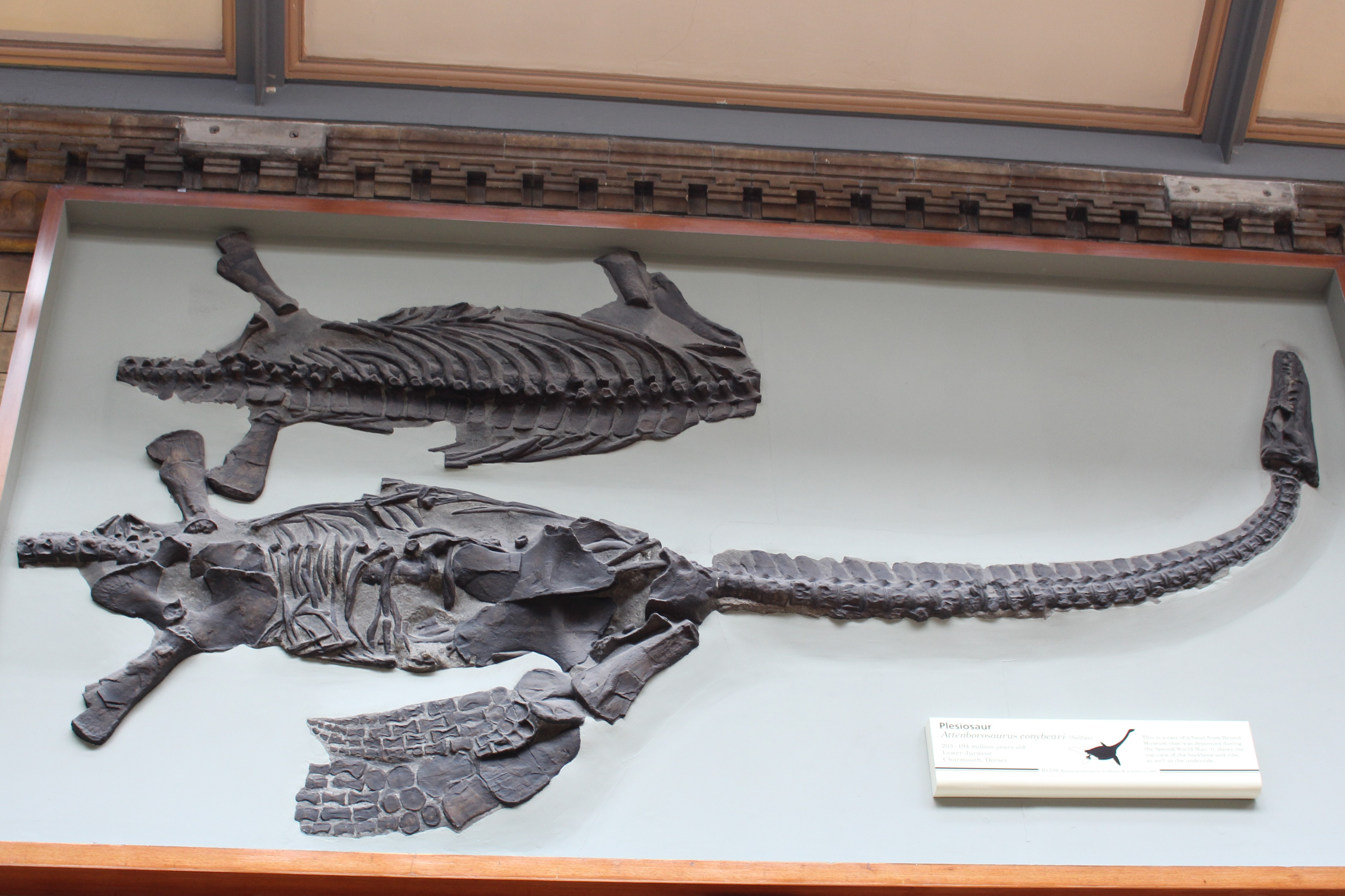
- Casts of the holotype specimen (NHMUK PV R 1339): one showing the left side view of the thorax (top) and another showing the underside of the body and right side view of the neck and skull (bottom), Natural History Museum

Scientific classification
- Kingdom: Animalia
- Phylum: Chordata
- Class: Reptilia
- Superorder: †Sauropterygia
- Order: †Plesiosauria
- Suborder: †Pliosauroidea
- Family: †Pliosauridae
- Genus: †Attenborosaurus; Bakker, 1993
- Species: †A. conybeari

Binomial name
- †Attenborosaurus conybeari (Sollas, 1881)

Synonyms
- Plesiosaurus conybeari Sollas, 1881

= Attenborosaurus =

Attenborosaurus Temporal range: Early Jurassic, 196.5–189.6 Ma

Extinct genus of reptiles

Attenborosaurus is an extinct genus of pliosaurid from the Early Jurassic of Dorset, England. The type species is A. conybeari. The genus is named after Sir David Attenborough, the species after William Conybeare.

== History ==
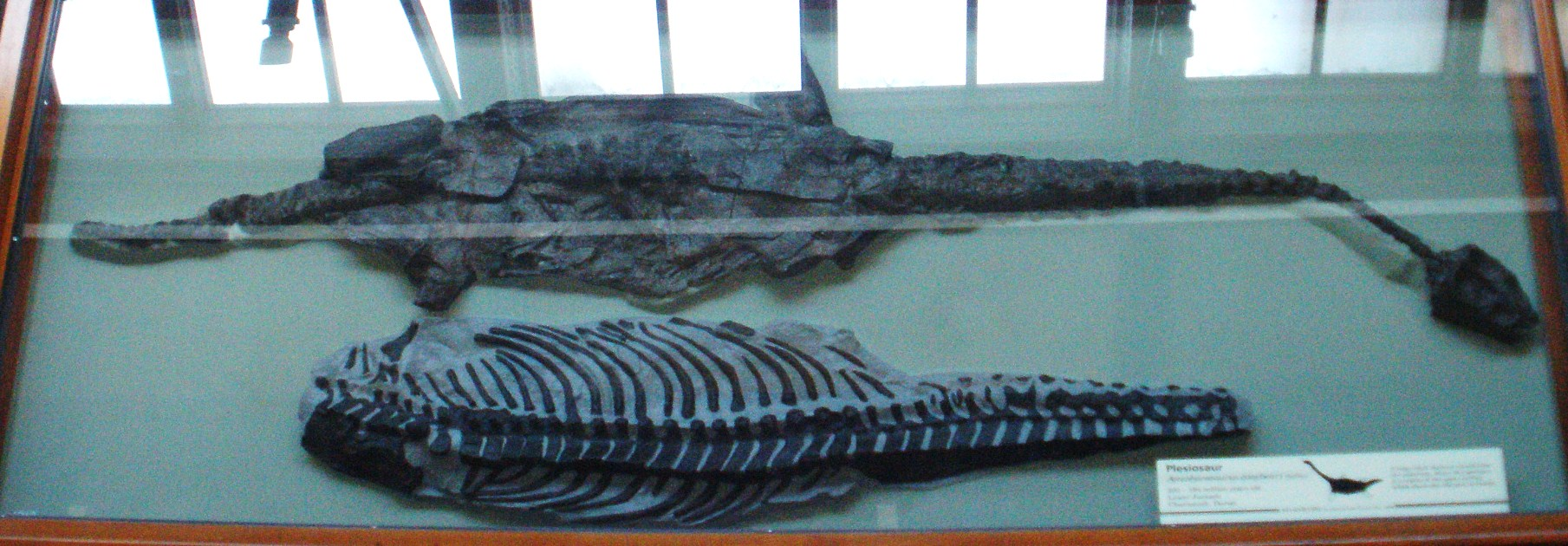
Casts of the referred specimen NHMUK PV OR 40140 which was previously considered a type for Plesiosaurus laticeps, Natural History Museum

The original remains of the holotype, specimen, were discovered in Charmouth, Dorset, England in 1880 and was described in 1881. This original specimen was housed at the Bristol City Museum and Art Gallery where it stayed until it was destroyed in November 1940, during World War II. Before the war in 1888, a cast had been made by William Johnson Sollas and sent to the Natural History Museum in London. This specimen (specimen NHMUK PV R 1339) is still housed at the Natural History Museum along with two referred specimens: specimen NHMUK OR 39514 which includes part of the skull; and specimen NHMUK OR 40140 which includes a skull and postcrania and was purchased by E.C. Day in 1866, also from Dorset. Specimens NHMUK PV R 1339 and NHMUK OR 40140 are both on public display in Fossil Way at the museum (although NHMUK OR 40140 is mislabeled as "40140/R1360").

At first the animal was thought to be another Plesiosaurus species by William Johnson Sollas in 1881, but after studies on the plaster casts made after the remains, Plesiosaurus conybeari was assigned to a new genus (Attenborosaurus) by Robert T. Bakker in 1993.

== Description ==
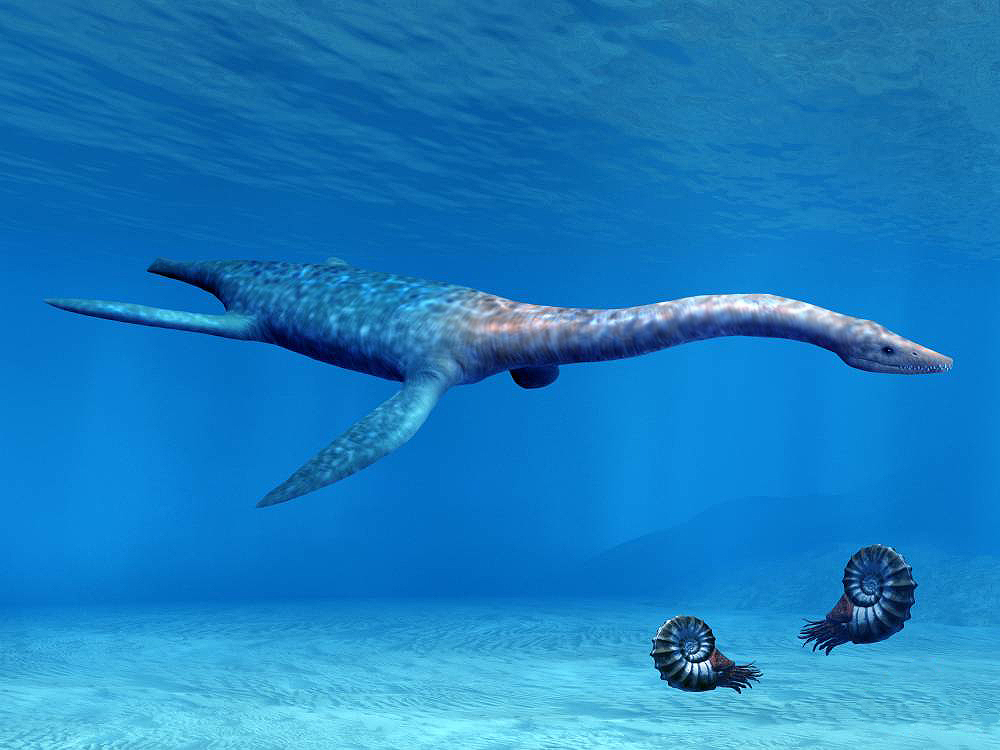
Life restoration with Asteroceras obtusum

The length of the holotype individual was about 4.3 m (14 ft). Much like other plesiosaurs, it was piscivorous. From the skin impression found with the bones, which was later destroyed, it is presumed that the creature had membranous skin, devoid of any significantly large scales, probably for decreasing water resistances.

== Classification ==
The following cladogram follows an analysis by Benson & Druckenmiller (2014).

- Plesiosauria
  - Stratesaurus
  - Eoplesiosaurus
  - Plesiosauroidea
  - Rhomaleosauridae
  - Pliosauridae
    - Thalassiodracon
    - - Hauffiosaurus
      - - Attenborosaurus
        - - Marmornectes
          - Thalassophonea
            - Peloneustes
            - - "Pliosaurus" andrewsi
              - - Simolestes
                - - Liopleurodon
                  - - "Liopleurodon" rossicus
                    - - Pliosaurus
                      - Gallardosaurus
                    - - Brachauchenius
                      - Kronosaurus
                      - Megacephalosaurus

== See also ==
- List of things named after David Attenborough and his works
- Timeline of plesiosaur research
- List of plesiosaur genera
