= Pleiosaur =

Pleiosaur is a misspelling of either of two types of extinct marine reptiles:

- Plesiosaur
- Pliosaur
