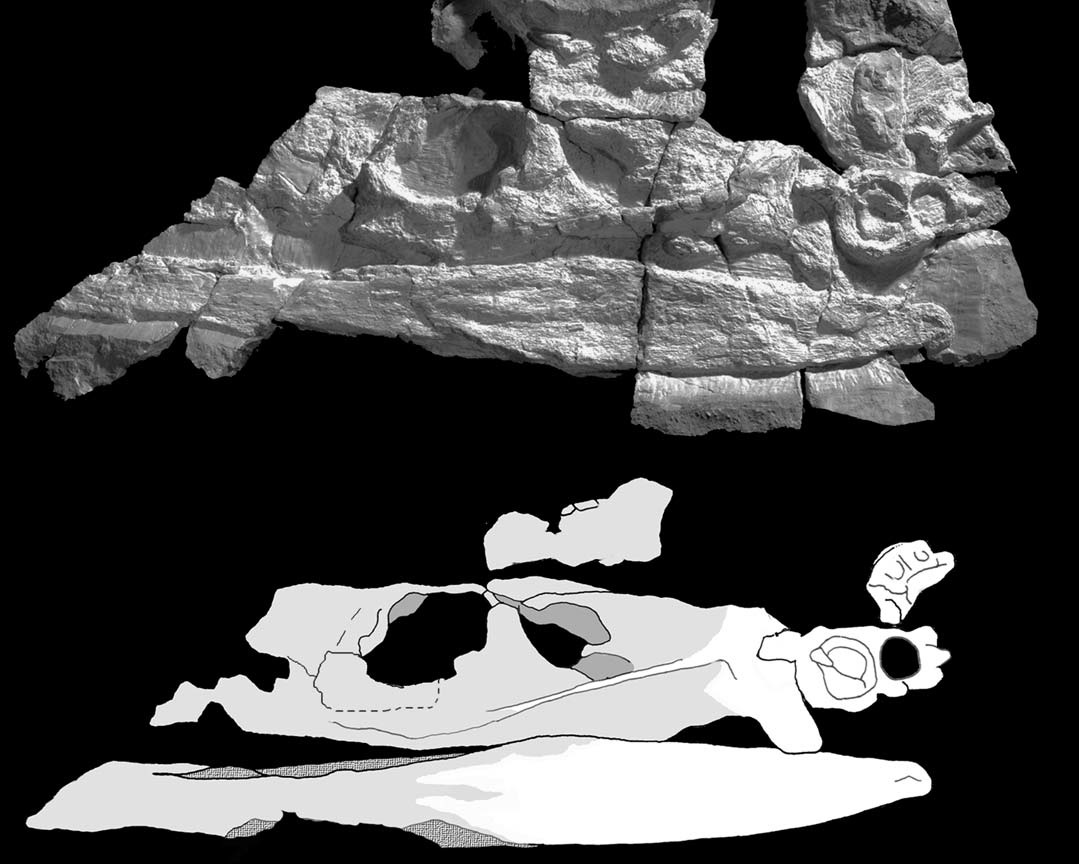
- Partial skull

Scientific classification
- Kingdom: Animalia
- Phylum: Chordata
- Class: Reptilia
- Superorder: †Sauropterygia
- Order: †Plesiosauria
- Suborder: †Pliosauroidea
- Family: †Pliosauridae
- Genus: †Anguanax; Cau & Fanti, 2015

Type species
- †Anguanax zignoi Cau & Fanti, 2015

= Anguanax =

Anguanax Temporal range: Late Jurassic, 160 Ma

Extinct genus of reptiles

Anguanax is an extinct genus of basal pliosaurid known from the Late Jurassic (Oxfordian stage) Rosso Ammonitico Veronese Formation of northern Italy. It contains a single species, Anguanax zignoi, known from a partially complete individual, representing the first articulated skeleton of an Italian plesiosaurian.

== Discovery and naming ==
Anguanax is known solely from the holotype MPPL 18797, currently housed at the Museo Paleontologico e della Preistoria ‘P. Leonardi’ in Ferrara. The skeleton, still articulated in several blocks of limestone, consists of a partial skull including the lower jaw, 32 isolated teeth, neck, back and tail vertebrae, a right pectoral girdle, a partial left humerus, a left radius, a left ulna, three left carpals, a partial pelvis, a femur, two epipodials, isolated metapodials and phalanges. It was collected during the 1980s from a nodular and cherty limestone interval at the Kaberlaba quarry in the Asiago Municipality of the Vicenza Province of northern Italy. This interval belongs to Lithozone 5 of the Middle Unit of the Rosso Ammonitico Veronese Formation which dates to the middle Oxfordian stage of the early Late Jurassic, about 160 million years ago. This quarry was first briefly mentioned by Achille de Zigno in 1883, who collected a series of vertebrae and other elements from the neighboring Cesuna quarry. The remains originally described as being exclusively plesiosaurian by Zigno, were subsequently identified to include crocodylomorph elements among them, although neither of which can be identified to the family level. Since then, the first identifiable marine reptile was collected and named from the upper units of the formation - the metriorhynchid crocodylomorph Neptunidraco ammoniticus which is known from several specimens.

Despite its discovery during the 1980s, MPPL 18797 was only first thoroughly described by Andrea Cau and Federico Fanti in 2014, and was found to represent the first articulated skeleton of an Italian plesiosaurian. The large size of the skull compared to the rest of the skeleton, as well as the presence of a lacrimal bone, and a distinct front-side facing projection of the prefrontal into the orbital margin, allowed to easily identify the specimen as belonging to Pliosauridae. The specimen was named in 2015 by Cau and Fanti following the preparation of additional bones, with the type species being Anguanax zignoi. The generic name is derived from Anguana, an aquatic creature with both fish and reptilian traits present in North Eastern Italian mythologies, and from anax, Greek for a lord, a "tribal and military leader". The specific name honors Zigno for discovering the first plesiosaurian remains from the Rosso Ammonitico Veronese Formation.

== Description ==
Anguanax is a medium-sized carnivorous basal pliosaurid, at an estimated body length of about 3–4 m (9.8–13.1 ft). Its general body proportions are similar to those of other early pliosaurid, for example the well-preserved Peloneustes. Anguanax fed on soft or small-bodied prey in the upper pelagic zone of its environment, as suggested by its moderately expanded side-facing eye sockets, the gracile and relatively long lower jaw, and the small, slender, and slightly curved teeth with fine serrations.

Anguanax possesses two unique traits among other plesiosaurians including a projection on the palpebral placed at midheight of the front-facing margin of the eye socket; and a posteroventral process of coracoid developed as a distinct trapezoid that does not reach the glenoid level from the side, and with a straight margin directed back and to the side from its back facing position. Additionally, other traits are relatively rare in pliosaurids and thus their combination in Anguanax distinguishes it from other pliosaurids. These include narrow axial neural spines, a back-directed retroarticular projection on the vertebrae, a hill on the coronoid depression, a stepped posteroventral corner of the back margin of the eye socket, rib facets that are placed dorsally on caudal vertebrae but does not extended to the neural arches, and front cervical centra that bear a low and broad midline ridge on their bottom surface.

== Phylogeny ==
A phylogenetic analysis was performed by Cau and Fanti in 2015 in order to resolve Anguanax position among other pliosaurids. They used the large species-level data-set of Benson and Druckenmiller (2014) that includes most known plesiosaurians, and recovered Anguanax as a non-thalassophonean pliosaurid. As in the original analysis of Benson and Druckenmiller (2014), advanced pliosaurids form a large polytomy unless fragmentary species are removed or stratigraphic assumptions are made. The following cladogram is simplified after this analysis, showing only the relationships inside Pliosauridae.

- Pliosauridae
  - Thalassiodracon hawkinsii
  - - - Hauffiosaurus longirostris
      - Hauffiosaurus tomistomimus
      - Hauffiosaurus zanoni
    - Attenborosaurus conybeari
    - - Anguanax zignoi
      - - Marmornectes candrewi
        - Thalassophonea
          - Peloneustes philarchus
          - - "Pliosaurus" andrewsi
            - - Simolestes vorax
              - - Liopleurodon ferox
                - a large polytomy of 12 species (incl. brachauchenines, Pliosaurus and Gallardosaurus)

== See also ==
- List of plesiosaur genera
- Timeline of plesiosaur research
