= Sinopliosaurus =

Sinopliosaurus Temporal range: Early Cretaceous, Aptian–Albian

Scientific classification
- Domain: Eukaryota
- Kingdom: Animalia
- Phylum: Chordata
- Class: Reptilia
- Superorder: †Sauropterygia
- Order: †Plesiosauria
- Family: †Pliosauridae
- Genus: †Sinopliosaurus; Young, 1944

Type species
- †Sinopliosaurus weiyuanensis Young, 1944

Extinct genus of reptiles

Sinopliosaurus (meaning "Chinese more lizard") is a dubious genus of pliosauroid plesiosaur. It lived during the Aptian and Albian stages of the Early Cretaceous (disputed Sinopliosaurus remains have been dated to the Toarcian age and were found in the Ziliujing Formation) of the People's Republic of China - its exact age is unknown. The type species, Sinopliosaurus weiyuanensis, was named and described in 1944 by Yang Zhongjian. One species, "S." fusuiensis, was later shown to be based on teeth from a spinosaurid theropod dinosaur which is now known as Siamosaurus. S. weiyuanensis was considered as a freshwater plesiosaur.

The holotype, IVPP V140, consists of three vertebrae and a tooth, discovered in a layer of the Lianmugin Formation (Tugulu Group).

== See also ==
- List of plesiosaur genera
- Timeline of plesiosaur research
