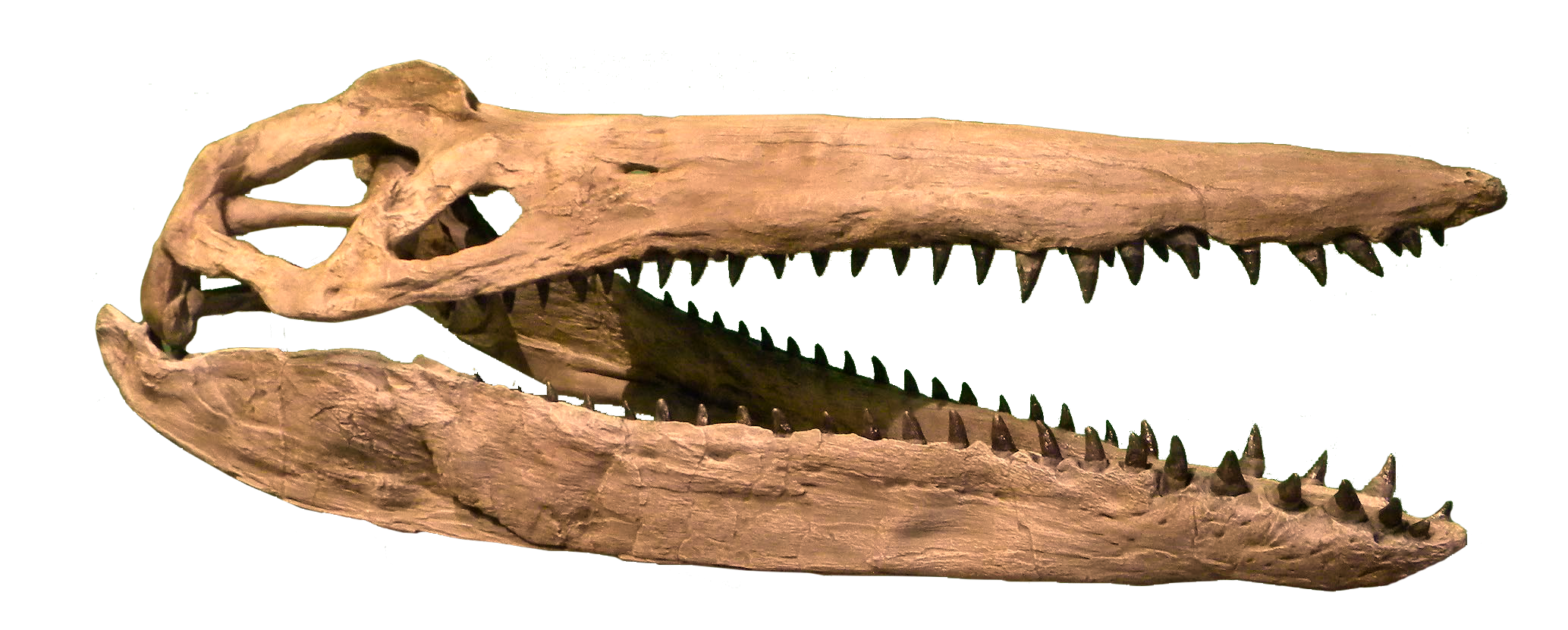
- Reconstructed skull in the Rocky Mountain Dinosaur Resource Center

Scientific classification
- Kingdom: Animalia
- Phylum: Chordata
- Class: Reptilia
- Superorder: †Sauropterygia
- Order: †Plesiosauria
- Suborder: †Pliosauroidea
- Family: †Pliosauridae
- Subfamily: †Brachaucheninae
- Genus: †Megacephalosaurus; Schumacher et al., 2013

Type species
- †Megacephalosaurus eulerti Schumacher et al., 2013

Synonyms
- Brachauchenius eulerti Benson et al., 2013

= Megacephalosaurus =

Megacephalosaurus Temporal range: Turonian, 93.9–92.9 Ma

Extinct genus of reptiles

Megacephalosaurus (/ˌmɛɡəˈsɛfəloʊˈsɔːrəs/; "great-headed lizard") is an extinct genus of short-necked pliosaur that inhabited the Western Interior Seaway of North America about 94 to 93 million years ago during the Turonian stage of the Late Cretaceous, containing the single species M. eulerti. It is named after its large head, which is the largest of any plesiosaur in the continent and measures up to 1.75 meters (5.7 ft) in length. Megacephalosaurus was one of the largest marine reptiles of its time with an estimated length of 6–9 meters (20–30 ft). Its long snout and consistently sized teeth suggest that it preferred a diet of smaller-sized prey.

Remains representing the pliosaur include two fossil skulls, three ribs, and a neural arch. The fossils have been found in deposits of the Carlile Shale and Greenhorn Limestone in Kansas and elsewhere in the midwestern United States. First discovered in 1950, they were originally thought to have been giant fossils of a closely related pliosaur known as Brachauchenius lucasi. But by 2013, paleontologists understood that such fossils belonged to a distinct animal. Megacephalosaurus was among the last known pliosaurs.

== Discovery and history ==
=== Initial identification as Brachauchenius lucasi ===
The first specimen of Megacephalosaurus was discovered on June 5, 1950 by two teenage brothers named Frank and Robert Jennrich while collecting fossil shark teeth near Fairport, in Russell County, Kansas. Their discovery consisted of a skull preserved bottom-side up and completely crushed into a thin layer. Recognizing the significance of their discovery, the brothers corresponded with paleontologist George F. Sternberg and led him to the fossil during the fall of 1950. Sternberg identified the locality to likely be either the Greenhorn Limestone or Graneros Shale with nearby fossils including that of a Xiphactinus. The three men, with the help of a local cow-herder named Jim Rouse, excavated the skull by late October of the same year. The land on which the fossil was found was owned by Otto C. Eulert (making the fossil his property), who subsequently donated the specimen to the Sternberg Museum of Natural History. This specimen was cataloged as FHSM VP-321. Sternberg wrote to Eulert on November 2, 1950, that he initially thought the fossil belonged to a large mosasaur. However, he quickly changed his identification to that of a plesiosaur. After conferring with Samuel Paul Welles of UC Berkeley and other paleontologists during the 1950 Society of Vertebrate Paleontology meeting in Albuquerque, New Mexico, Sternberg identified FHSM VP-321 as the Late Cretaceous pliosaur Brachauchenius lucasi. Although additional associated fossils of the specimen were recovered during its excavation, Sternberg had the skull and left lower jaw embedded on a mount of plaster and displayed it in the museum's public exhibits by 1951.

=== Reexamination and redescription ===
The identification of the supposed B. lucasi skull that is FHSM VP-321 was unquestioned for decades. Even a study done in 1996 on the mounted skull identified it as such as the diagnostic features of the dorsal sides of the skull, which was the only parts of the skull visible, were still characteristic of B. lucasi. In November 2003, Robert Jennrich led staff members of the Sternberg Museum to the original locality where he and his brother discovered the specimen. Scientists found that this locality was not of the Greenhorn Limestone or Ganeros Shale as Sternberg initially presumed, but instead of the Fairport Chalk Member of the Carlile Shale, dated approximately 92.9 mya. Paleontologists began to doubt the identification of FHSM VP-321 when in 2007 the Sternberg Museum curator Mike Everhart discovered photos of the skull's underside taken prior to its mounting, which revealed underside features that were different from those found in other B. lucasi skulls. To confirm the perceived differences, FHSM VP-321 was arranged to be removed from its mount and Everhart collaborated with paleontologists Bruce A. Schumacher of the USDA Forest Service and Kenneth Carpenter of the USU Eastern Prehistoric Museum in a study to examine the underside of the skull. The study, which was published in 2013, found the skull bore several unique features that made it distinct from B. lucasi and concluded that FHSM VP-321 was a distinct genus of pliosaur. It was named Megacephalosaurus eulerti, with the generic name being a portmanteau of the Ancient Greek μέγας (mégas, "great") and κεφαλή (kephalḗ, "head") prefixed onto σαῦρος (saûros, "lizard") in reference to the size of the skull, and the specific epithet being an honor of Eulert for his donation of the fossil.

The history of the paratype skull UNSM 50136 was unclear when it was first examined by Schumacher in a 2008 study. When it was recovered from the collections of the University of Nebraska State Museum for study, there was strangely no contextual information or records pertaining to the large fossil. The few reputed information on the skull included one that simply stated it originated from Kansas, leading Schumacher to speculate that it may have originally been within the collections of the Sternberg Museum and was obtained by the University of Nebraska during a fossil exchange. No stratigraphic data was recorded for USNM 50136, but tests on a piece of matrix extracted from the fossil identified nannofossil assemblages that are most associated with deposits of the Greenhorn Limestone likely dated around 93.9 mya at earliest. Schumacher concluded that USNM 50136 was a species with affinities to B. lucasi and that it could either expand the definition of the taxon or be of an entirely new species, assigning the open nomenclature aff. Brachauchenius lucasi. When FHSM VP-321 was found to be a distinct genus, USNM 50136 was identified to be conspecific with it and was assigned to be its paratype.

In a blog post, Everhart suggested that two partial fossil skulls from Kansas, currently labeled as B. lucasi, may actually belong to Megacephalosaurus. The first, housed at the Sternberg Museum without an associated catalogue number, also comes from Russell County, like the holotype. Although it was briefly mentioned in a 1997 publication, the specimen has not yet been formally described. The second skull, catalogued as UNSM 112437, comes from the Graneros Shale and was discovered during the construction of Glen Elder Dam in Mitchell County, being possibly the oldest known specimen of the taxon.

== Description ==
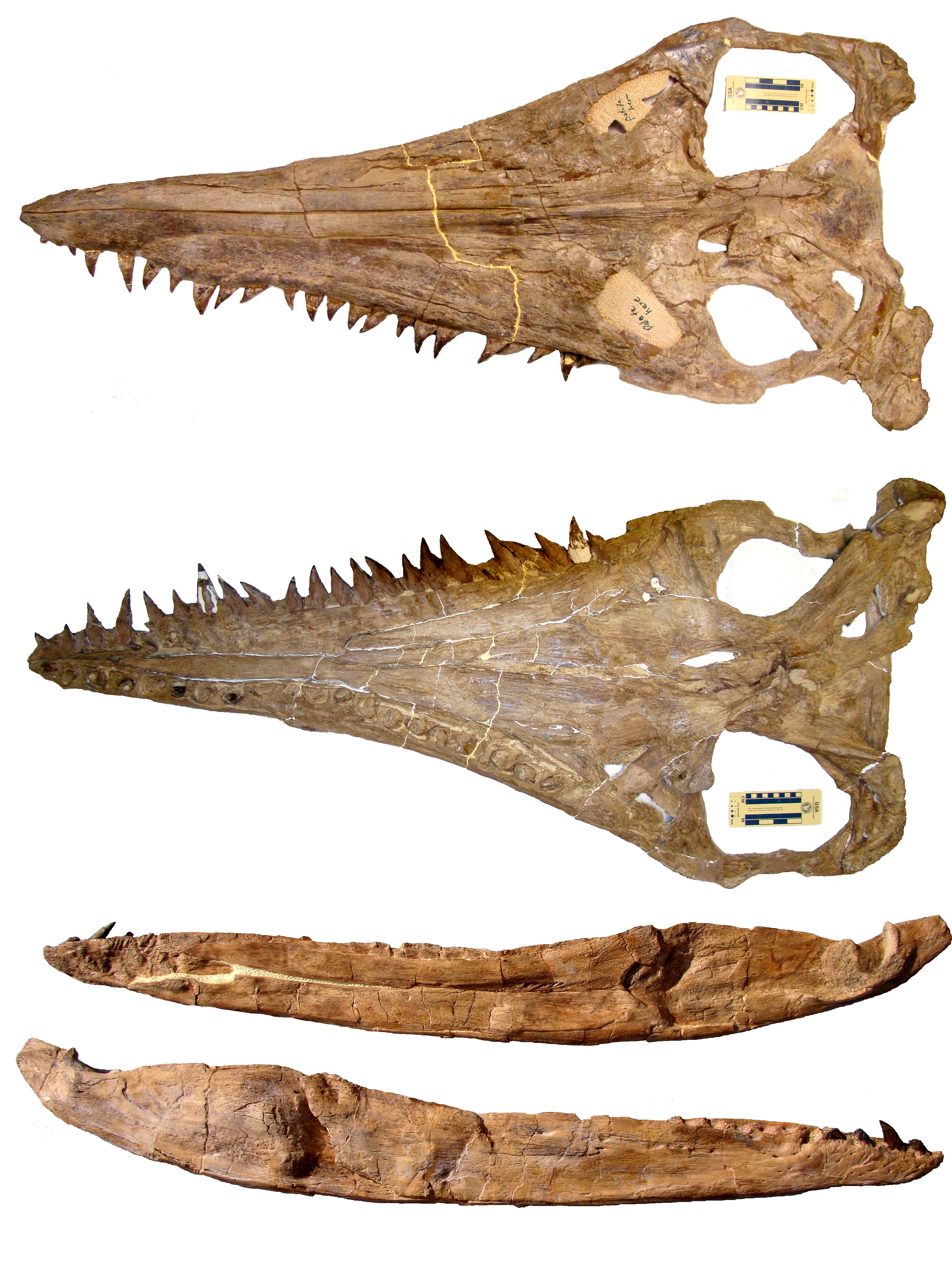
Views from different angles of the skull and right mandible of the holotype specimen of M. eulerti (FHSM VP-321).

Two specimens pertaining to Megacephalosaurus are known. Both represent fossil skulls. The holotype is FHSM VP-321, which consists of a nearly complete skull, three cervical ribs, and a cervical neural arch. The second specimen, USNM 50136, is designated as the paratype specimen. It consists of a partial skull containing parts of the upper jaw and some cranial bones.

The skull of Megacephalosaurus is the largest known for any plesiosaur from North America to date. FHSM VP-321 measures 150 centimeters (59 in) in length when measuring along the midline of the cranium and the length of the lower jaw measures 171 centimeters (67 in). UNSM 50136, although incomplete, is much larger than FHSM VP-321 and is estimated to have measured 175 centimeters (69 in) when it was complete. Based on understandings from fossils of other pliosaurs the skull likely equated to about one-fifth to one-fourth of total body length. This would yield a range of 6–9 meters (20–30 ft) in total body length for Megacephalosaurus.

The snout is very elongate, making up around two-thirds of the total skull length. It tapers to a point with a small 3-centimeter-long (1.2 in) rostrum before the first teeth. The dentary, which houses the lower teeth, also takes up around two-thirds of the total length of the lower jaw. The upper jaws possess twenty-two functional teeth on the right side and twenty-three teeth on the left; four of the frontmost pairs are located on the premaxilla while the rest are located on the maxilla. Unlike in pliosaurs such as Liopleurodon or Pliosaurus, the maxillary teeth in Megacephalosaurus do not reduce in size towards the base of the skull and are all consistently large. A pair of small pits measuring less than 1 centimeter (0.39 in) long is present just before the frontmost pair of functional teeth. It is believed that pits represent vestigial dental alveoli that once held an additional pair of teeth in ancestral species but devolved in Megacephalosaurus. Almost all pliosaurs normally have five pairs of premaxillary teeth and this feature of reduction to four pairs is fairly unique among pliosaurs, indicating that the reduction to four pairs of premaxillary teeth may have been a novel adaptation introduced by Cretaceous pliosaurs. The lower jaws bear twenty-three pairs of functional teeth. Only the five frontmost pairs are relatively large, all teeth subsequent of them get progressively smaller as they progress towards the base of the dentary in a smooth transition. The sixth to fifteenth lower jaw teeth are considered to be intermediate-sized, and all teeth posterior to such are considered small.

The teeth are conical, ending at a pointed tip, and are slightly curved towards the tongue and away from the midline of the jaw. The teeth are fairly large and the largest teeth known in Megacephalosaurus measure up to approximately 4.5 centimeters (1.8 in) in crown height. The enamel features patterns of long, thin, and convex ridges known as apicobasal ridges that run in the direction from the crown base to tip. Approximately half of these ridges, spaced 13–16 per centimeter (33–41 per in) of crown circumference, reach the full length of the crown. The function of apicobasal ridges in the teeth has been proposed to be to improve gripping and puncturing prey.

The ribs are similar in general shape with those in typical Jurassic pliosaurs. However, ribs of Megacephalosaurus are double-headed, meaning that the head of the rib is structured for attachment at two points of a vertebra. This is a unique feature among Cretaceous pliosaurs, of which all but Megacephalosaurus lack. Double-headed ribs have been present in some Jurassic pliosaurs and it was previously thought that this feature disappeared with their extinction.

== Classification ==
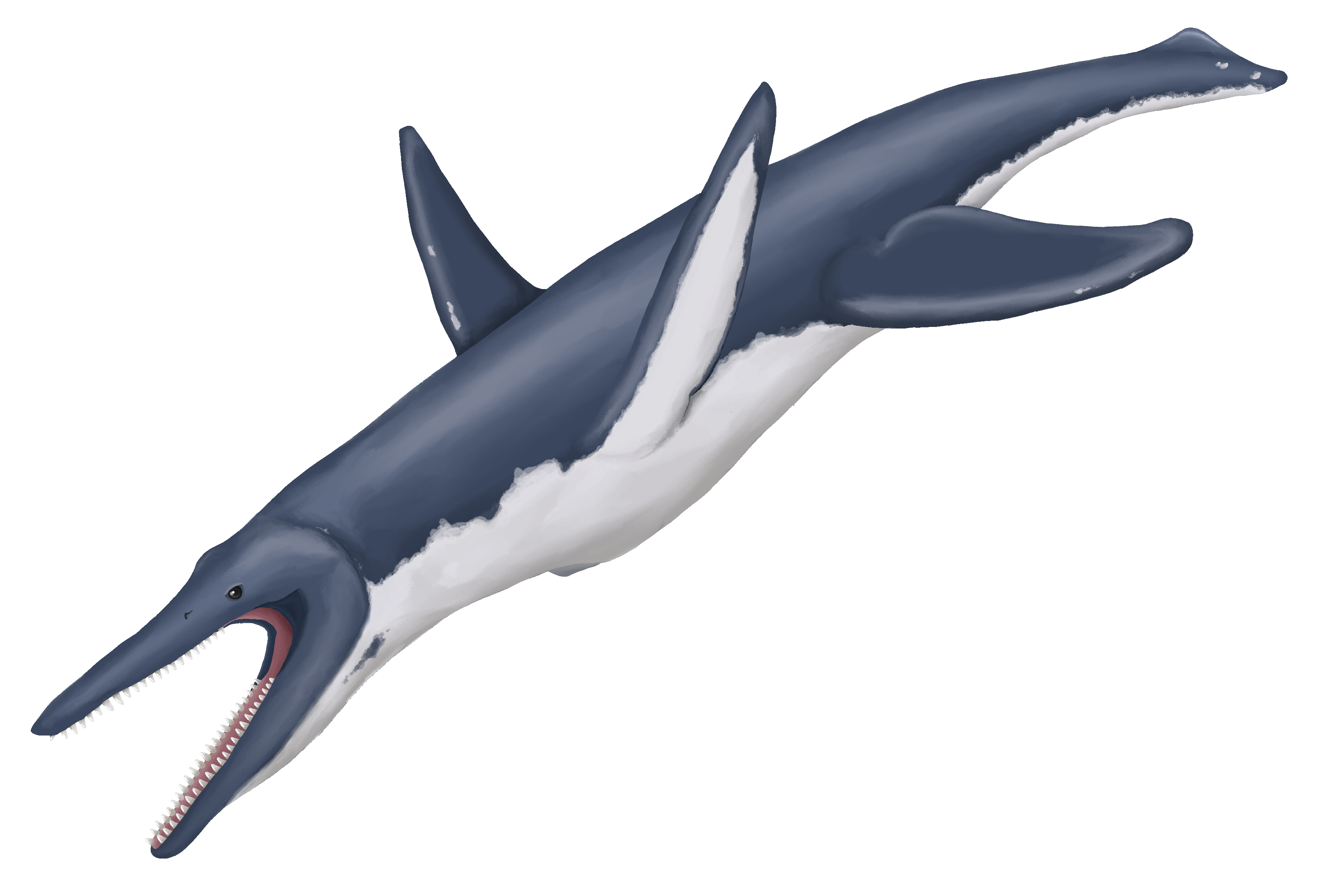
Life restoration

Megacephalosaurus is a member of the subfamily Brachaucheninae, which consists of pliosaurs that are currently only known during the Cretaceous period. Phylogenetic analyses of all known Cretaceous pliosaurs have consistently recovered them within the subfamily, which led to a hypothesis that it was the only lineage of pliosaurs that crossed the boundary between the Jurassic and Cretaceous. However, these patterns may have been due to large gaps in the fossil record, particularly an absence of pliosaur fossils during many stages of the Early Cretaceous. Recent discoveries of Early Cretaceous pliosaur teeth exhibiting distinct teeth characteristics now challenge the hypothesis and alternatively suggests that at least one more lineage crossed the Jurassic-Cretaceous divide.

Members of the Brachaucheninae are variable and only one uniting characteristic between all is known; the possession of somewhat circularly-shaped teeth rather than full or somewhat trihedral-shaped teeth seen in some Jurassic pliosaurs. Some characteristics that are shared by most brachauchenines like Megacephalosaurus includes skull features (such as an elongated snout, gracile rostrum, and consistently sized teeth) that are better adapted for a general evolutionary shift towards smaller prey. However, there are notable exceptions such as Kronosaurus, which has teeth that are each shaped differently. A 2018 study by Daniel Madzia of the Polish Academy of Sciences, Sven Sachs of the Natural History Museum, Bielefeld, and Johan Lindgren of Lund University hypothesized that the presence of these inconsistencies indicates that the trait for consistently-sized teeth evolved independently within the Brachaucheninae three times; these occurrences being independently in Luskhan, Stenorhynchosaurus, and in a clade that includes Megacephalosaurus and Brachauchenius.

An early phylogenetic attempt including a Megacephalosaurus specimen was performed in a 2012 study led by Roger Benson of the University of Oxford. It recovered FHSM VP-321 in a clade in which it is basal to another clade that includes Brachauchenius and Kronosaurus. In 2013, Benson led another study that attempted another phylogenetic analysis using a better description of FHSM VP-321 made by Schumacher et al. (2013), being named as Brachauchenius eulerti. This time, the study recovered FHSM VP-321 from a polytomy clade shared by Brachauchenius and a pliosaur specimen cataloged as DORK/G/1-2 but doubtfully labeled as 'Polyptychodon interruptus', with one outgroup consisting of Kronosaurus, under a strict reduced consensus. In an alternate strict consensus analysis, the study recovered the FHSM VP-321 from a polytomy clade that includes Pliosaurus and Gallardosaurus. Another study published in 2015 by Andrea Caua and Federico Fanti of the University of Bologna yielded similar phylogenetic results in a strict consensus method. Madzia et al. (2018) attempted multiple phylogenetic analyses with different methods of consensus. All strict consensus methods recovered Megacephalosaurus from a polytomy clade only shared by Brachauchenius, Kronosaurus, and DORK/G/1-2, while some majority rule consensus methods saw Megacephalosaurus fall in a clade that had a polytomy with DORK/G/1-2 but derived from a clade shared with Kronosaurus and basal to a clade that includes Brachauchenius.

The cladogram below is modified from Madzia et al. (2018).

- Thalassophonea
  - Peloneustes philarchus
  - - 'Pliosaurus' andrewsi
    - - Simolestes vorax
      - - Liopleurodon ferox
        - - Pliosaurus patagonicus
          - Pliosaurus almanzaensis
          - 'Pliosaurus' irgisensis
          - Pliosaurus rossicus
          - Gallardosaurus iturraldei
          - - Pliosaurus brachyspondylus
            - Pliosaurus macromerus
            - Pliosaurus brachydeirus
            - Pliosaurus westburyensis
            - - - Pliosaurus kevani
                - Pliosaurus cf. kevani
              - - Pliosaurus carpenteri
                - Pliosaurus funkei
          - Brachaucheninae
            - Makhaira rossica
            - - Luskhan itilensis
              - - Stenorhynchosaurus munozi
                - - cf. Kronosaurus queenslandicus (QM f51291)
                  - Kronosaurus queenslandicus
                  - - Megacephalosaurus eulerti
                    - 'Polyptychodon interruptus' (DORK/G/1-2)
                    - - cf. Brachauchenius lucasi (MNA V9433)
                      - Brachauchenius lucasi

== Paleoecology ==
The Western Interior Seaway during the time of Megacephalosaurus

Megacephalosaurus was among the last of the pliosaurs. It inhabited the Western Interior Seaway that spanned the middle of North America and cut it in two during the Turonian stage of the Late Cretaceous. The pliosaur was present during the Cenomanian-Turonian boundary event, a period marked with significant worldwide faunal turnovers and extinctions caused by an abnormally intense increase in underwater volcanism, which ushered a global anoxic event that acidified the oceans, increased global temperatures, and caused a mass extinction that led to the disappearance of 26% of the entire marine fauna. Despite this, the vertebrate assemblages in the Western Interior Seaway remained stable throughout the ordeal as many of the taxa are also known from deposits before and after the boundary.

The fossil assemblages of the Turonian-aged portions of the Fairport Chalk and Greenhorn Shale are considered small in terms of the number of present species but nevertheless encompassed a wide ecological diversity. Sharks constituted the majority of vertebrate diversity, of which Cretoxyrhina and Squalicorax were the most common. Other types of sharks that were present included the mackerel sharks Cretalamna, Cardabiodon, Cretodus, Archaeolamna and Dallasiella, the durophagous Ptychodus, and the sand shark Johnlongia. Several bony fish are also known. Many of their fossils are too fragmentary to be properly identified, but known Turonian taxa include but not limited to Enchodus, Pachyrhizodus, and the ichthyodectids Ichthyodectes and Xiphactinus. While consistent in fauna, the abundance of fish fossils from the Turonian-aged Fairport Chalk and Greenhorn Shale are significantly lower than such from older deposits such as an earlier deposit of the Greenhorn Shale below the Cenomanian-Turonian boundary that has yielded hundreds to thousands of fish fossils. However, this may simply be a case of collecting bias. Of the marine reptiles, plesiosaurs – including the polycotylid Trinacromerum, pliosaurs such as Brachauchenius and Megacephalosaurus itself, and indeterminate elasmosaurs – sea turtles, the crocodylomorph Terminonaris, the marine squamate Coniasaurus, and plioplatecarpine mosasaurs have been found within the Turonian Fairport Chalk and/or Greenhorn Shale. The Turonian also marked the beginning of the radiation of mosasaurs, coinciding with the temporal range of Megacephalosaurus, which would have encountered such marine reptiles.

The temporal range of Megacephalosaurus extends past the Cenomanian-Turonian boundary and after the anoxic event. By this point, only three known pliosaur taxa remained: itself, Brachauchenius, and the dubious Polyptychodon. All three pliosaurs disappeared during the progression of the Turonian stage, marking the extinction of the pliosaurs. It has been hypothesized that this final demise may have been linked with the rise of polycotylids, which have been rapidly diversifying around the same time.

== See also ==
- List of plesiosaur genera
- Timeline of plesiosaur research
