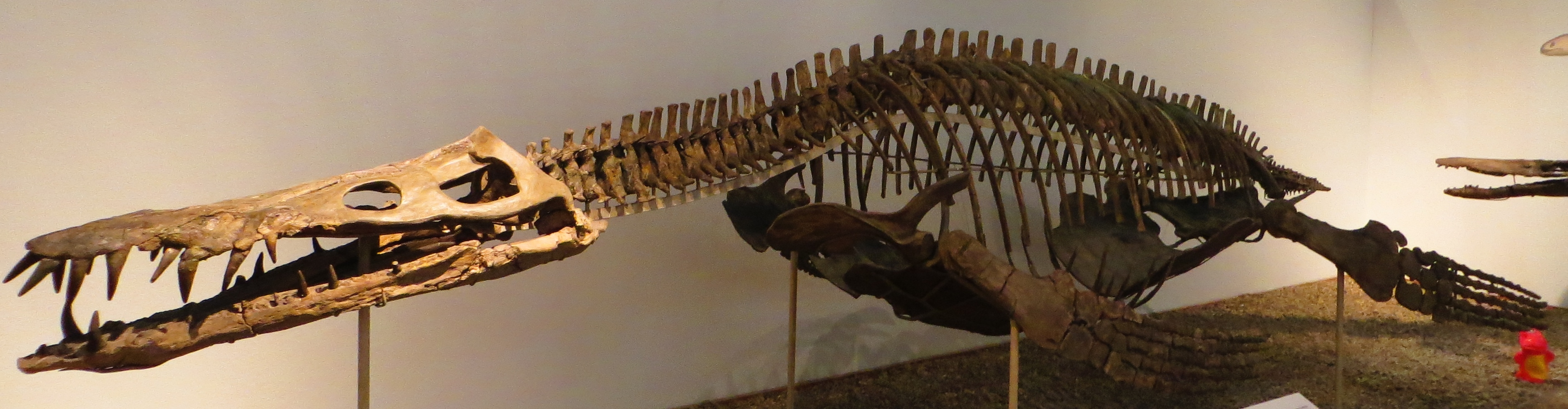
- Liopleurodon ferox mounted skeleton, Museum of Paleontology, Tübingen
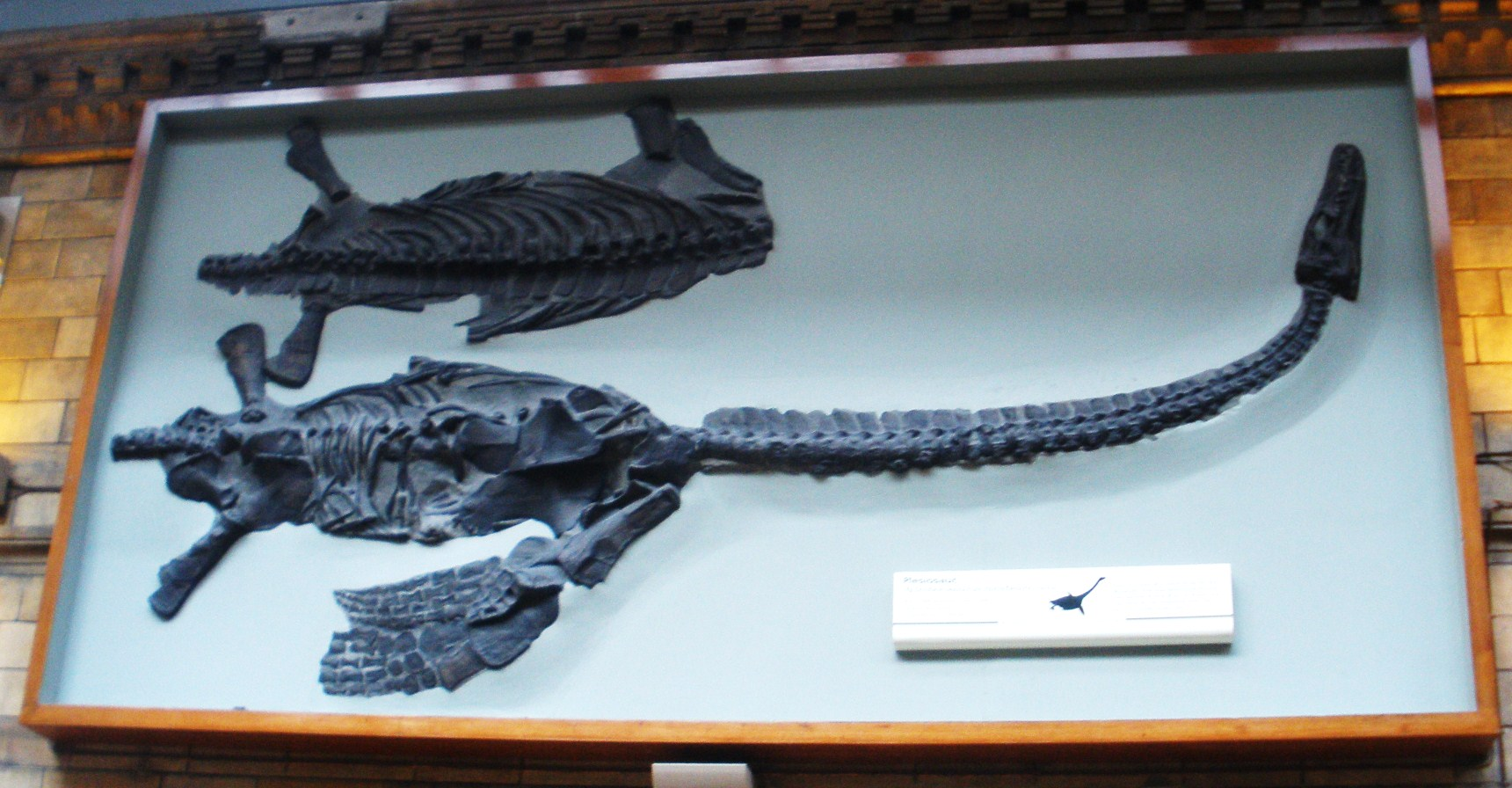
- Cast of the primitive pliosaur Attenborosaurus conybeari (NHMUK R1339), Natural History Museum

Scientific classification
- Kingdom: Animalia
- Phylum: Chordata
- Class: Reptilia
- Superorder: †Sauropterygia
- Order: †Plesiosauria
- Suborder: †Pliosauroidea
- Family: †Pliosauridae; Seeley, 1874

Subgroups
- †Anguanax; †Arminisaurus; †Attenborosaurus; †Hauffiosaurus; †Marmornectes; †Pachycostasaurus; †Rhaeticosaurus; †Thalassiodracon; †Thalassophonea Benson & Druckenmiller, 2013; †Eardasaurus; †Gallardosaurus; †Ischyrodon; †Liopleurodon; †Megalneusaurus; †Peloneustes; †Pliosaurus; †Simolestes; †Brachaucheninae Williston, 1925; †Acostasaurus; †Boyacasaurus; †Brachauchenius; †Kronosaurus; †Lorrainosaurus; †Luskhan; †Makhaira; †Megacephalosaurus; †Monquirasaurus; †Polyptychodon; †Sachicasaurus; †Stenorhynchosaurus

= Pliosauridae =

Pliosauridae Temporal range: Late Triassic (Rhaetian) - Late Cretaceous (Turonian) 205–90 Ma

Extinct family of reptiles

Pliosauridae is a family of plesiosaurian marine reptiles from the Latest Triassic to the early Late Cretaceous (Rhaetian to Turonian stages). The family is more inclusive than the archetypal short-necked large headed species that are placed in the subclade Thalassophonea, with early, primitive forms resembling other plesiosaurs with long necks.

The largest thalassophonean pliosaurs reached 10–11 metres (33–36 ft), in length, with around a quarter of this length being the head. Thalassophonean pliosaurs represented the largest marine predators during their existence, spanning more than 80 million years.

Pliosaurs went extinct during the early Late Cretaceous and were subsequently replaced by the mosasaurs.

== Taxonomy ==
Pliosauridae was formally named by Harry G. Seeley in 1874.

Pliosauridae is a stem-based taxon defined in 2010 (and in earlier studies in a similar manner) as "all taxa more closely related to Pliosaurus brachydeirus than to Leptocleidus superstes, Polycotylus latipinnis or Meyerasaurus victor". The family Brachauchenidae has been proposed to include pliosauroids which have very short necks and may include Brachauchenius and Kronosaurus. However, modern cladistic analyses found that this group is actually a subfamily of pliosaurids, and possibly even the "crown group" of Pliosauridae.

Within Pliosauridae, there is a more derived clade called Thalassophonea. Thalassophonea was erected by Roger Benson and Patrick Druckenmiller in 2013. The name is derived from Greek thalassa (θάλασσα), "sea", and phoneus (φονεύς), "murderer". It is a stem-based taxon defined as "all taxa more closely related to Pliosaurus brachydeirus than to Marmornectes candrewi". It includes the short necked and large headed taxa that typify the family.

The following cladogram follows an analysis by Benson & Druckenmiller (2014).

- Plesiosauria
  - Stratesaurus
  - Eoplesiosaurus
  - Plesiosauroidea
  - Rhomaleosauridae
  - Pliosauridae
    - Thalassiodracon
    - - Hauffiosaurus
      - - Attenborosaurus
        - - Marmornectes
          - Thalassophonea
            - Peloneustes
            - - "Pliosaurus" andrewsi
              - - Simolestes
                - - Liopleurodon
                  - - "Liopleurodon" rossicus
                    - - Pliosaurus
                      - Gallardosaurus
                    - Brachaucheninae
                      - Brachauchenius
                      - Kronosaurus
                      - Megacephalosaurus
