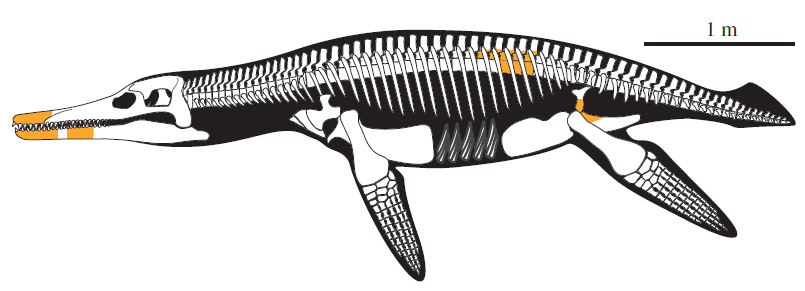
- Restoration of Makhaira; the preserved remains are showed in color.

Scientific classification
- Kingdom: Animalia
- Phylum: Chordata
- Class: Reptilia
- Superorder: †Sauropterygia
- Order: †Plesiosauria
- Suborder: †Pliosauroidea
- Family: †Pliosauridae
- Subfamily: †Brachaucheninae
- Genus: †Makhaira; Fischer et al., 2015
- Species: †M. rossica

Binomial name
- †Makhaira rossica Fischer et al., 2015

= Makhaira rossica =

Makhaira Temporal range: Hauterivian, 130 Ma

Extinct species of reptile

Makhaira rossica is an extinct genus and species of a marine reptile belonging to the family Pliosauridae. It lived during the early Cretaceous period (Hauterivian epoch, about 130 million years ago), and its fossils have been found in Russia.

== Description ==
Although fragmentary, the fossils of this animal have enough to differentiate it from other similar plesiosaurs. Makhaira must have measured about 5 metres (16 ft) long, and like its other relatives, must have had a compact body with four large paddle-like limbs. The skull was elongated, particularly in the rostral area, with several sharp teeth. The characteristics of these teeth are unique. They are triangular in cross view and have carinae or grooves with denticles at the edges, which possess a height greater than its width. Denticles varied in length along the ridge and formed a kind of undulation in the edge of the tooth. The first tooth protruded from the premaxilla, while the mandibular symphysis (the part of the jaw where both rami meet) was very long and had more than ten tooth sockets on each side. The face was long and straight, devoid of any lateral expansion.

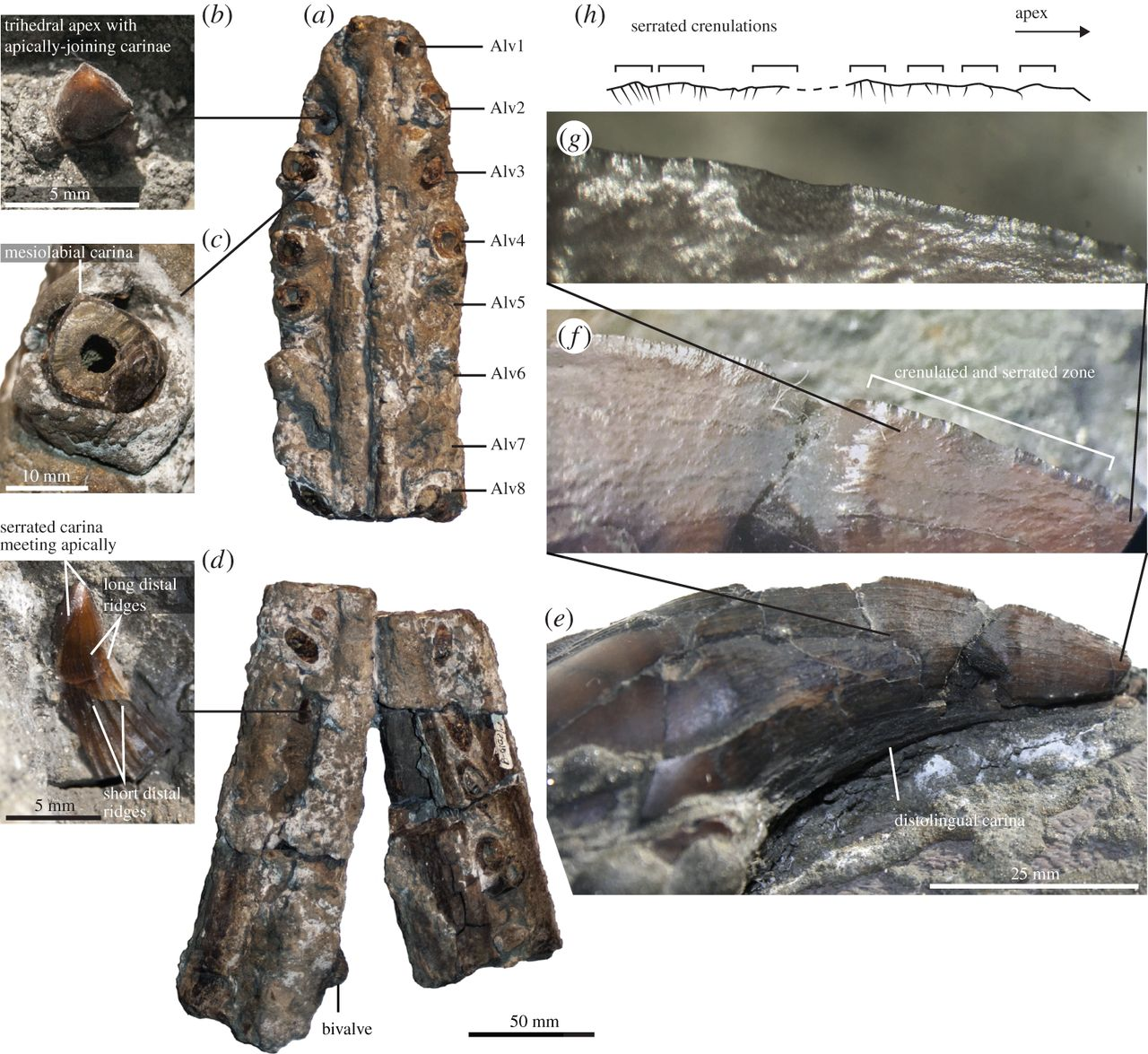
Teeth and mandible of Makhaira rossica.

== Classification ==
Makhaira rossica was first described in 2015, based on fossil remains recovered near the Volga River in the Ulyanovsk Oblast, in Russia. This reptile was evidently a representative of the pliosaurids, a group of plesiosaurs characterized by their short neck and large head. Unlike most other Cretaceous pliosaurids, Makhaira was not large; it seems to be close to the origin of the clade known as Brachaucheniinae, which includes Brachauchenius and Megacephalosaurus, which lived a few million years later and reached larger sizes.

== Paleobiology ==
Makhaira was probably a predator of relatively large animals, as suggested by the slightly curved and serrated teeth. The peculiar teeth of Makhaira suggests that it fed on different types of prey, compared to other Cretaceous pliosaurids. The characteristics of the teeth of Makhaira are also very similar to those of metriorhynchids crocodylomorphs and raise the question of whether these were still present at the end of the Cretaceous, as suggested by the discovery of an isolated tooth from the Aptian of Sicily, Italy.
