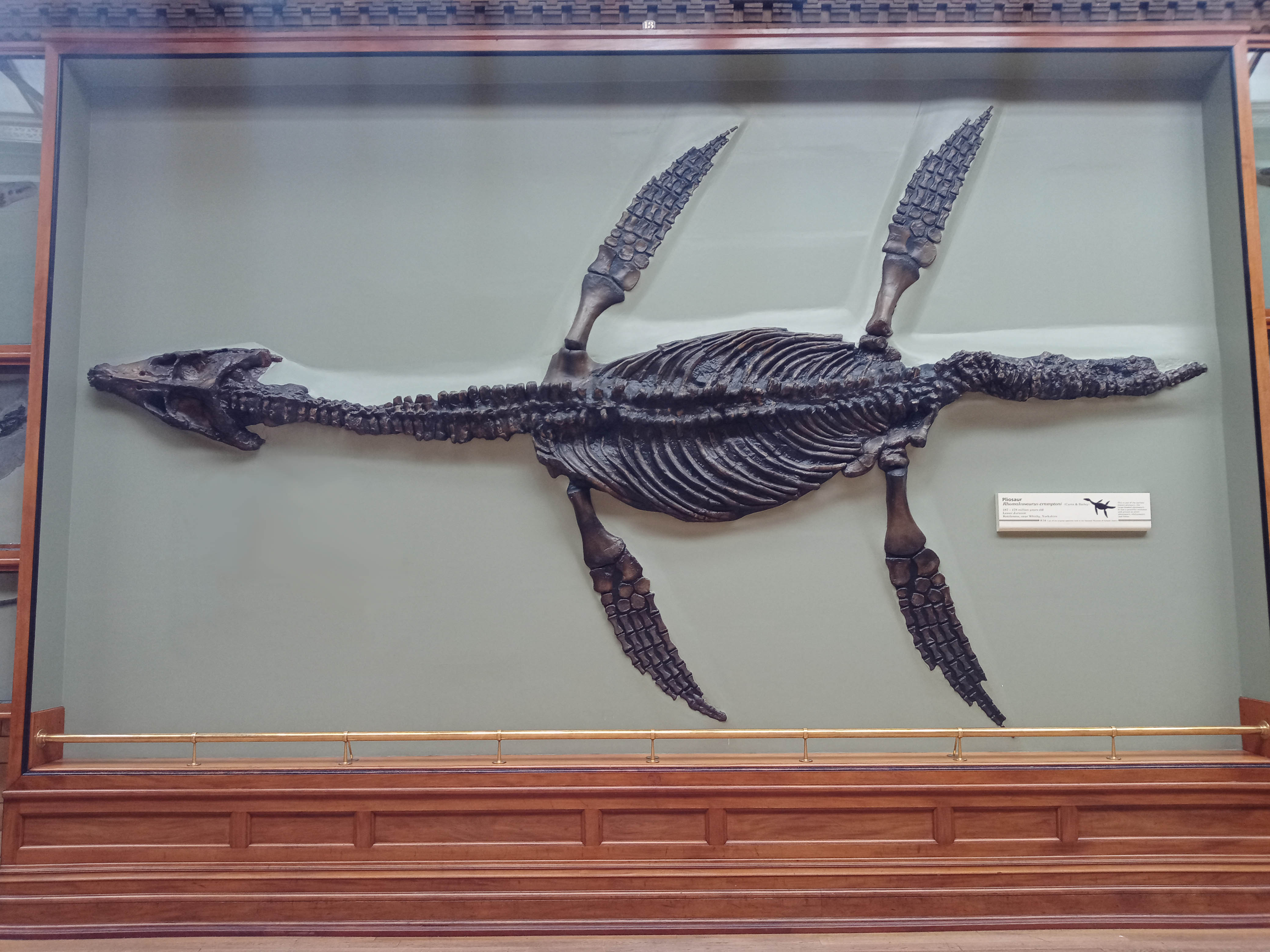
- Cast of Rhomaleosaurus cramptoni (NHMUK PV R 34), Natural History Museum, London
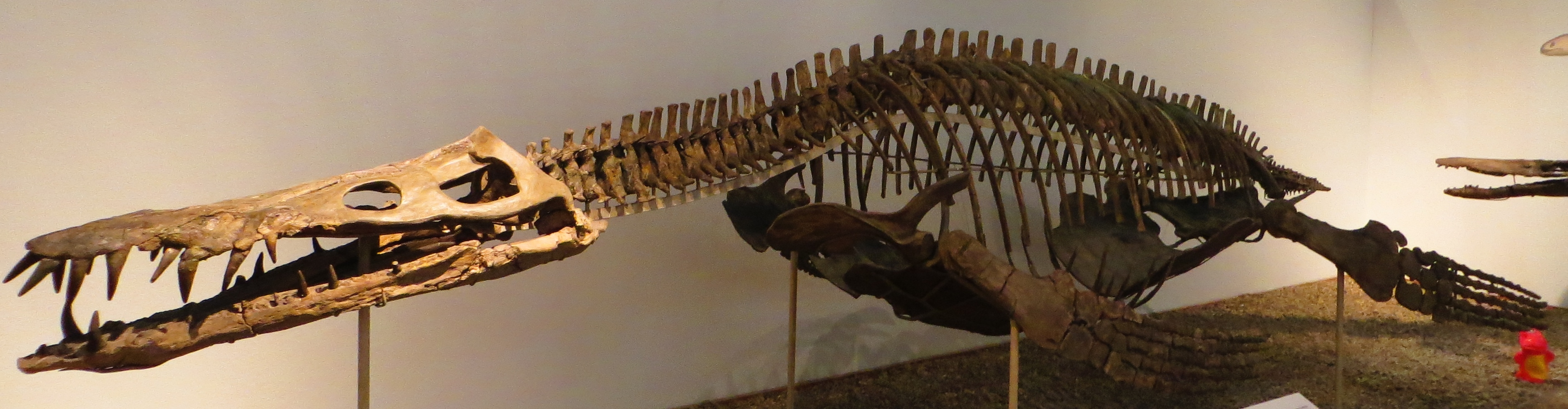
- Liopleurodon ferox mounted skeleton, Museum of Paleontology, Tübingen

Scientific classification
- Kingdom: Animalia
- Phylum: Chordata
- Class: Reptilia
- Superorder: †Sauropterygia
- Order: †Plesiosauria
- Clade: †Neoplesiosauria
- Suborder: †Pliosauroidea; Welles, 1943

Subgroups
- †Eurysaurus?; †Sinopliosaurus?; †Rhomaleosauridae Kuhn, 1961; †Pliosauridae Seeley, 1874

= Pliosauroidea =

Pliosauroids Temporal range: Rhaetian–Turonian

Extinct clade of reptiles

Pliosauroidea is an extinct clade of plesiosaurs, known from the latest Triassic to early Late Cretaceous. They are best known for the subclade Thalassophonea, which contained crocodile-like short-necked forms with large heads and massive toothed jaws, commonly known as pliosaurs. More primitive non-thalassophonean pliosauroids resembled plesiosaurs in possessing relatively long necks and smaller heads. They originally included only members of the family Pliosauridae, of the order Plesiosauria, but several other genera and families are now also included, the number and details of which vary according to the classification used.

The distinguishing characteristics are a short neck and an elongated head, with larger hind flippers compared to the fore flippers, the opposite of the plesiosaurs. They were carnivorous and their long and powerful jaws carried many sharp, conical teeth. Pliosaurs range from 4 to 10 meters or more in length. Their prey may have included fish and, in the more macropredatory taxa, sharks, ichthyosaurs, other plesiosaurs, and possibly dinosaurs.

The largest known taxa, all reaching lengths of around 10m, include Kronosaurus, Sachicasaurus, Monquirasaurus, and Pliosaurus; other well-known genera include Rhomaleosaurus, Peloneustes, Liopleurodon, and Macroplata. Fossil specimens have been found in Africa, Australia, China, Europe, North America and South America.

Many very early (from the Early Jurassic and possibly Latest Triassic, i.e. Rhaetian) primitive pliosauroids were very like plesiosauroids in appearance and, indeed, used to be included in the family Plesiosauridae.

== Name ==
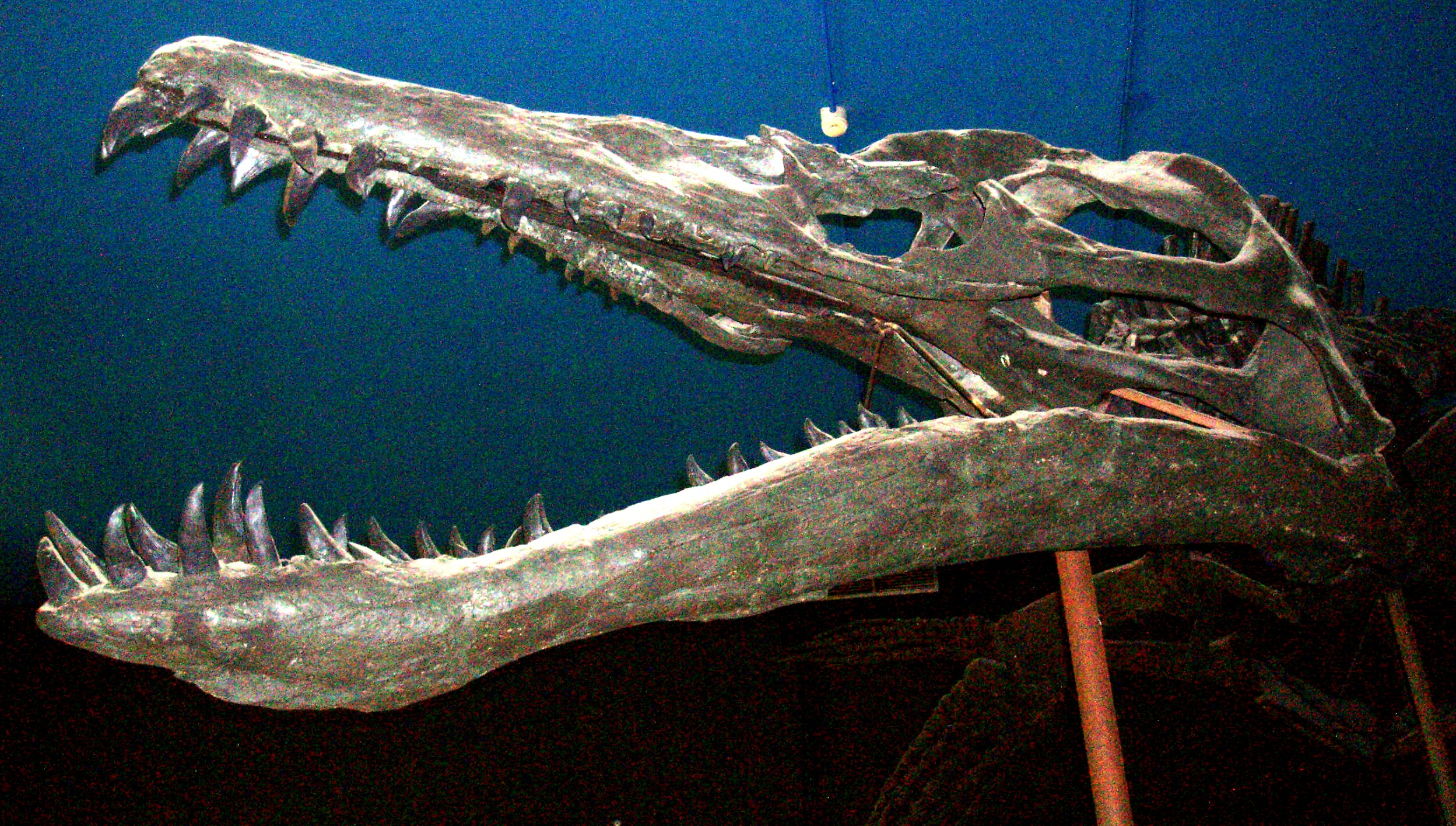
Liopleurodon ferox

Pliosauroidea was named by Welles in 1943. It is adapted from the name of the genus Pliosaurus, which is derived from the Greek πλειων (pleion), meaning "more/closely", and σαυρος (sauros) meaning "lizard"; it therefore means "more saurian". The name Pliosaurus was coined in 1841 by Richard Owen, who believed that it represented a link between plesiosauroids and crocodilians (considered a type of "saurian"), particularly due to their crocodile-like teeth.

== Classification ==
=== Taxonomy ===
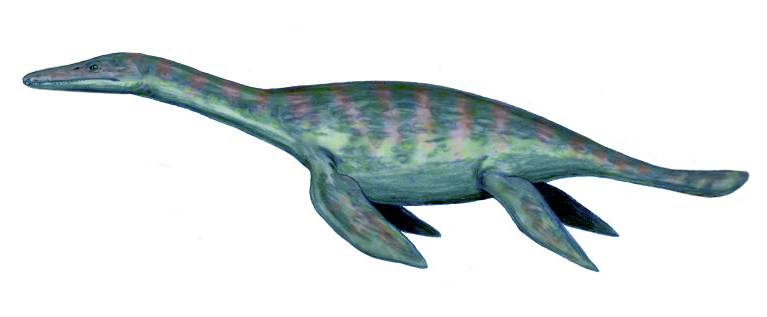
Macroplata

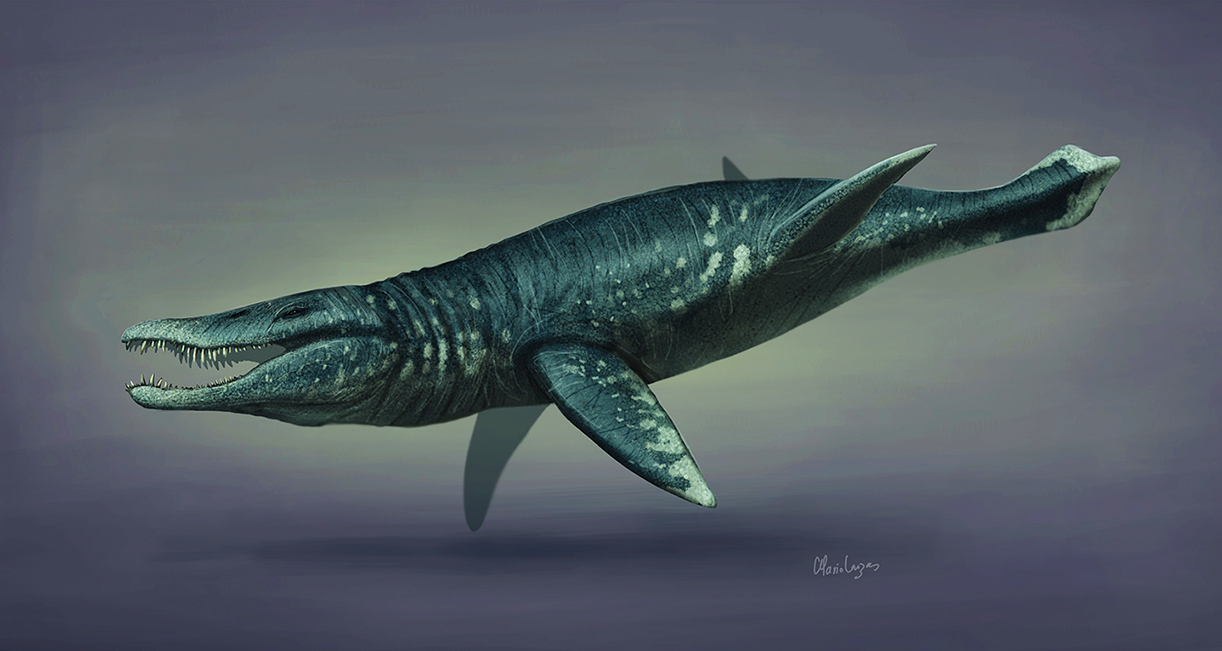
Pliosaurus

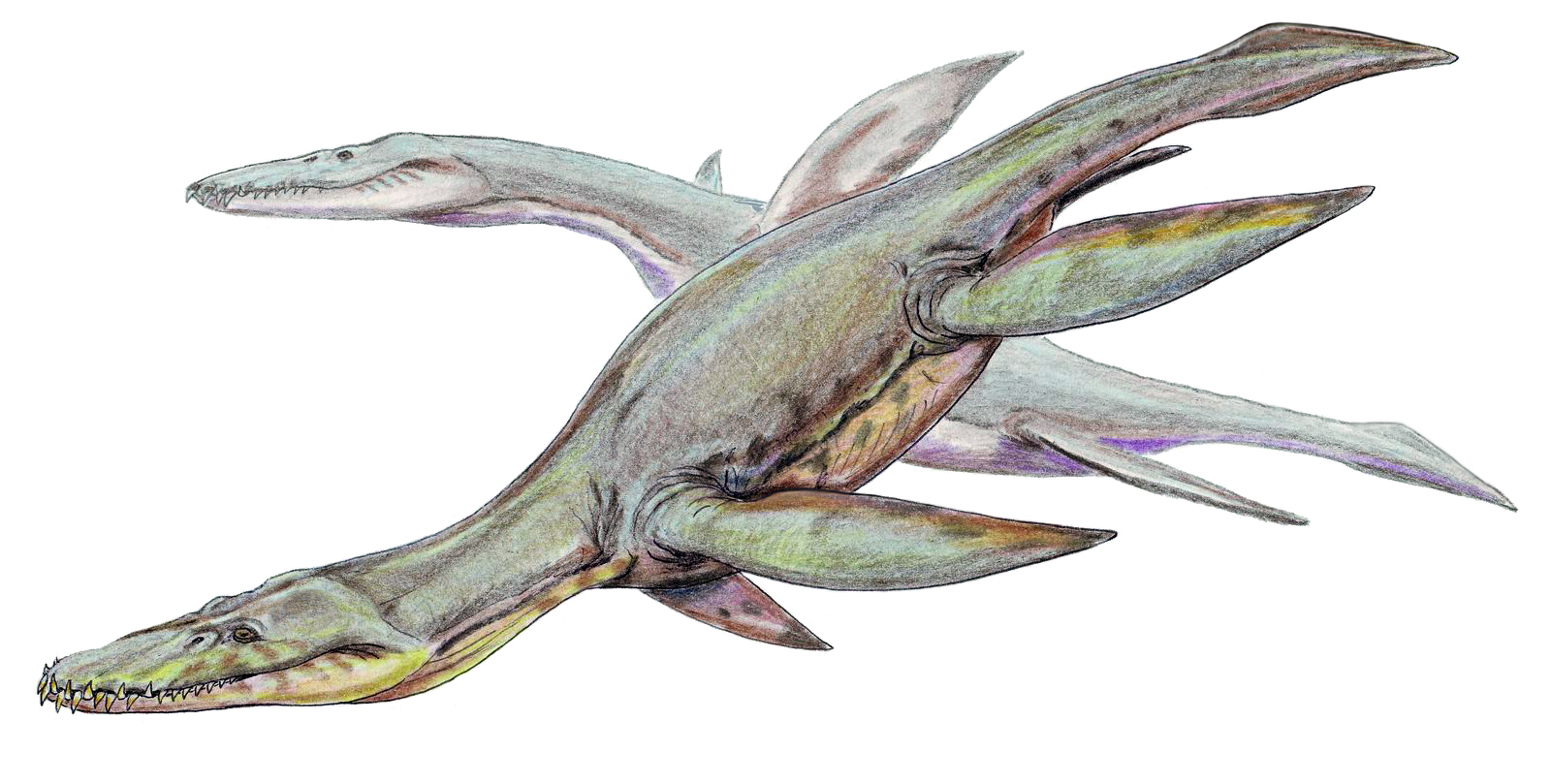
Simolestes vorax

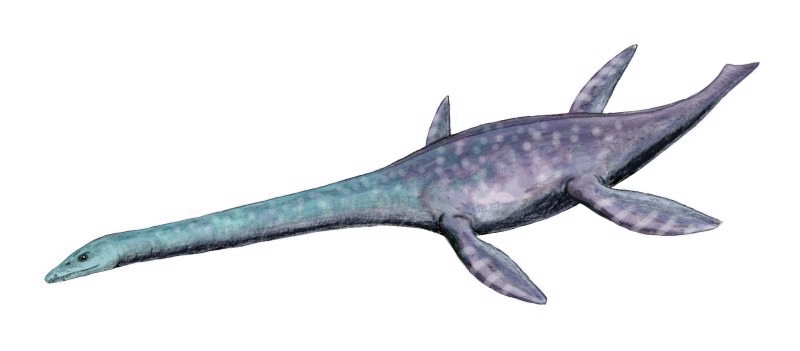
Attenborosaurus

The taxonomy presented here is mainly based on the plesiosaur cladistic analysis proposed by Hilary F. Ketchum and Roger B. J. Benson, 2011 unless otherwise noted.

- Suborder Pliosauroidea
  - Eurysaurus?
  - Sinopliosaurus?
  - Family Rhomaleosauridae
    - Archaeonectrus
    - Bishanopliosaurus?
    - Borealonectes
    - Eurycleidus
    - Macroplata
    - Maresaurus
    - Meyerasaurus
    - Rhomaleosaurus
    - Sthenarosaurus
    - Yuzhoupliosaurus?
  - Family Pliosauridae
    - Anguanax
    - Attenborosaurus
    - Eardasaurus
    - Gallardosaurus
    - Hauffiosaurus
    - Liopleurodon
    - Marmornectes
    - Megalneusaurus
    - Pachycostasaurus
    - Peloneustes
    - Pliosaurus
    - Rhaeticosaurus
    - Simolestes
    - Thalassiodracon
    - Subfamily Brachaucheninae
      - Brachauchenius
      - Kronosaurus
      - Luskhan
      - Makhaira
      - Megacephalosaurus
      - Monquirasaurus
      - Polyptychodon
      - Sachicasaurus
      - Stenorhynchosaurus

=== Phylogeny ===
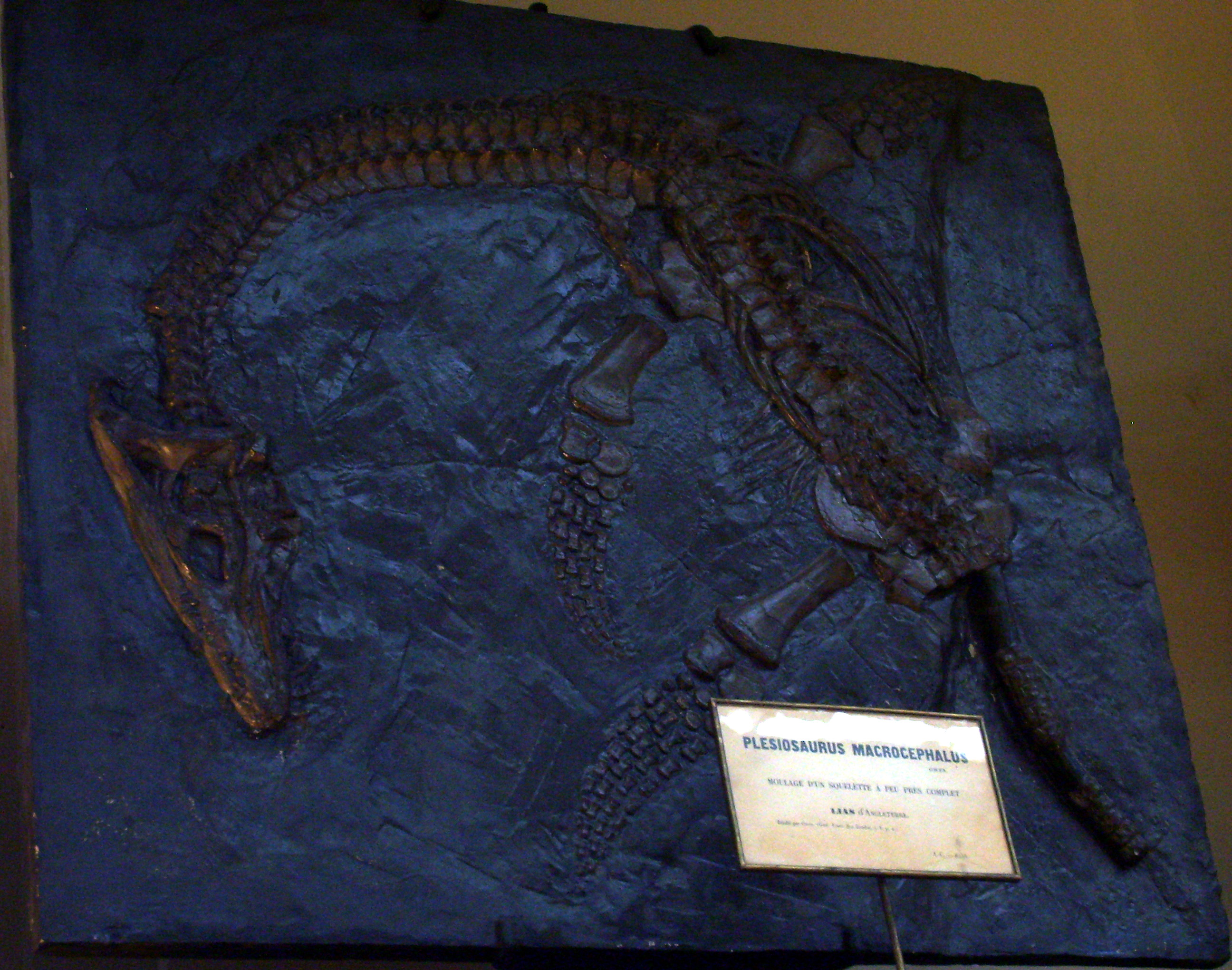
Cast of "Plesiosaurus" macrocephalus found by Mary Anning, Muséum national d'histoire naturelle, Paris

Pliosauroidea is a stem-based taxon that was defined by Welles as "all taxa more closely related to Pliosaurus brachydeirus than to Plesiosaurus dolichodeirus". Pliosauridae and Rhomaleosauridae are stem-based taxa too. Pliosauridae is defined as "all taxa more closely related to Pliosaurus brachydeirus than to Leptocleidus superstes, Polycotylus latipinnis or Meyerasaurus victor". Rhomaleosauridae is defined as "all taxa more closely related to Meyerasaurus victor than to Leptocleidus superstes, Pliosaurus brachydeirus or Polycotylus latipinnis". The cladogram below follows a 2011 analysis by paleontologists Hilary F. Ketchum and Roger B. J. Benson, and reduced to genera only.

- Pliosauroidea
  - Rhomaleosauridae
    - Anningasaura
    - - - "Plesiosaurus" macrocephalus
        - - Archaeonectrus
          - Macroplata
      - - Atychodracon
        - - Eurycleidus
          - - Rhomaleosaurus
            - - Meyerasaurus
              - Maresaurus
  - Pliosauridae
    - Thalassiodracon
    - - Hauffiosaurus
      - - Attenborosaurus
        - - - BMNH R2439
            - Marmornectes
          - - "Pliosaurus" andrewsi
            - - - OUMNH J.02247
                - Peloneustes
              - - Simolestes
                - - Liopleurodon
                  - - Pliosaurus
                    - - Megacephalosaurus
                      - - Brachauchenius
                        - Kronosaurus

== Large pliosauroids ==
Some pliosauroids, all in Pliosauridae, reached very large sizes (in excess of 10m) that make them the largest of all plesiosaurs (though the largest elasmosaurs are longer due to their extremely long necks).

In 2002, the discovery of a very large pliosaur was announced in Mexico. This pliosauroid came to be known as the "Monster of Aramberri". Although widely reported as such, it does not belong to the genus Liopleurodon. The remains of this animal, consisting of a partial vertebral column, were dated to the Kimmeridgian of the La Caja Formation. The fossils were found much earlier, in 1985, by a geology student and were at first erroneously attributed to a theropod dinosaur by Hahnel. The remains originally contained part of a rostrum with teeth (now lost).

In August 2006, palaeontologists of the University of Oslo discovered the first remains of a pliosaur on Norwegian soil. The remains were noted for their giant size and described as "very well preserved, as well as being unique in their completeness". In the summer of 2008, this specimen was excavated from the permafrost on Svalbard, a Norwegian island close to the North Pole. The excavation of the find is documented in the 2009 History television special Predator X. The specimen was later described as a new species of Pliosaurus, P. funkei.

On 26 October 2009, palaeontologists reported the discovery of potentially the largest pliosaur yet found. Found in cliffs near Weymouth, Dorset, on Britain's Jurassic Coast, the fossil had a skull length of 6 feet 5 inches (1.96 meters). Palaeontologist Richard Forrest told the BBC: "I had heard rumours that something big was turning up. But seeing this thing in the flesh, so to speak, is just jaw dropping. It is simply enormous." The specimen was later described as a new species of Pliosaurus, P. kevani.

In December 2023, the discovery of a pliosaur skull on the Dorset coast was described as "one of the most complete specimens of its type ever discovered". The excavation and research of the skull was covered in the PBS documentary Attenborough and the Jurassic Sea Monster hosted by David Attenborough.
