= Marmornectes =

Marmornectes Temporal range: Middle Jurassic, 164.7–163.5 Ma

Scientific classification
- Domain: Eukaryota
- Kingdom: Animalia
- Phylum: Chordata
- Class: Reptilia
- Superorder: †Sauropterygia
- Order: †Plesiosauria
- Family: †Pliosauridae
- Genus: †Marmornectes; Ketchum & Benson, 2011
- Species: †M. candrewi

Binomial name
- †Marmornectes candrewi Ketchum & Benson, 2011

Extinct genus of reptiles

Marmornectes is a genus of pliosaurid known from the Middle Jurassic of Bedfordshire, United Kingdom.

== Etymology ==
Marmornectes was first named by Hilary F. Ketchum and Roger B. J. Benson in 2011 and the type species is Marmornectes candrewi. The generic name is derived from marmor, Latin for "marble", and nectes, Greek for "swimmer", thus the meaning is "marble-swimmer". The specific name honors Chris Andrew for finding the only known specimen and donating it to Bedford Museum in 1998.

== Description ==
Marmornectes is known from the holotype BEDFM 1999.201, an articulated partial skeleton which includes the skull. It was collected in 1999 from the Sigaloceras enodatum ammonoid subzone of the Peterborough Member, Oxford Clay Formation, which dates to the early Callovian stage of the late Middle Jurassic, about 164.7-163.5 million years ago. It was found in the monotypic locality of Quest Pit, east of Stewartby.

It was a longirostrine pliosaurid with seven autapomorphies, and is most similar to Peloneustes philarchus. Nevertheless, a cladistic analysis found it to be basal to Peloneustes and other pliosaurids. An undescribed pliosaurid, NHMUK R2439, was found to be the sister taxon of this genus.

== Phylogeny ==
The following cladogram follows Ketchum and Benson, 2022.

- - Marmornectes candrewi
  - - Thalassophonea
      - Peloneustes philarchus
      - - Eardasaurus powelli
        - - "Pliosaurus" andrewsi
          - - Simolestes vorax
            - - Liopleurodon ferox
              - - Pliosaurus spp.
                - Brachaucheninae

== See also ==
- List of plesiosaur genera
- Timeline of plesiosaur research
