= Gallardosaurus =

Gallardosaurus Temporal range: Oxfordian ~161–156 Ma
- Skeletal diagram showing known material

Scientific classification
- Kingdom: Animalia
- Phylum: Chordata
- Class: Reptilia
- Superorder: †Sauropterygia
- Order: †Plesiosauria
- Suborder: †Pliosauroidea
- Family: †Pliosauridae
- Clade: †Thalassophonea
- Genus: †Gallardosaurus; Gasparini, 2009

Type species
- †Gallardosaurus iturraldei Gasparini, 2009

Extinct genus of reptiles

Gallardosaurus is a genus of pliosaurid plesiosaur from the Caribbean seaway. It contains the single species Gallardosaurus iturraldei. Gallardosaurus was found in middle-late Oxfordian-age (Late Jurassic) rocks of the Jagua Formation of western Cuba. Gallardosaurus is believed to be evolutionarily connected to Peloneustes, a pliosaurid commonly found in the Oxfordian-aged sediment.

== History and etymology ==
Oxfordian-age reptiles have been found in Cuba since the first half of the 20th century, but most have not received wide recognition because publications were not widely disseminated. In 1996, Dr. Manuel Iturralde-Vinent and Mark Norell initially mentioned specimen MNHNCu P3005, a partial skull and mandible with a few cervical vertebrae, as resembling that of the species Pliosaurus ferox. The specimen had been discovered in 1946 by Cuban farmer Juan Gallardo about 8 kilometres (5.0 mi) east of Viñales, Pinar del Río, northwestern Cuba. However, it was not prepared when Iturralde-Vinent and Norell saw it and a full description was not made. After preparation, Zulma Gasparini and Iturralde-Vinent assigned the specimen to the genus Peloneustes in 2006, but it was later determined that the specimen was that of a new genus. In 2009, MNHNCu P3005 was described as a separate genus, Gallardosaurus.

The generic name is derived from the specimen MNHNCu P3005's discoverer, Juan Gallardo, who together with Juanito Gallardo is credited with discovering most of the Oxfordian reptiles in Cuba. The species name G. itturraldei is derived from the name of the geotectonist and paleontologist Dr. Manuel Iturralde Vinent.

MNHNCu P3005 was found in a concretion in dark shale, within the Jagua Vieja Member of the Jagua Formation. It is preserved three-dimensionally with slight deformation. The tip of the snout and the posterior ends of the lower jaw are absent. The skull was broad and not tall, with long pointed teeth. The lack of fusion in some of the vertebrae suggests the individual was not fully grown when it died.

== Classification ==
- Pliosauridae
  - Hauffiosaurus
  - - Kronosaurus
    - - - Peloneustes
        - Gallardosaurus
      - - Liopleurodon
        - - Brachauchenius
          - Pliosaurus

A cladogram following Gasparini (2009)

Gallardosaurus was a pliosaurid, a member of the family Pliosauridae, a group of short-necked reptiles that lived during the Mesozoic Era. Other members of the group include Hauffiosaurus, Kronosaurus, Peloneustes, Liopleurodon, Brachauchenius, and Pliosaurus.

== Paleobiology and paleoecology ==
G. iturraldei would probably have seasonally migrated across the Caribbean Seaway, and would have preyed mostly on nectonic fish that dwelt in the region in which it existed. Also known from the Jagua Vieja Member are ichthyosaurs, the marine turtle Notoemys oxfordiensis, and the plesiosauroid Vinialesaurus caroli. The water depth was shallow, perhaps 10 to 12 metres (33 to 39 ft) deep, and oysters and algae colonized the sea bottom. Fragmentary remains of plants, pterosaurs, and dinosaurs arrived from nearby coastal areas.

== See also ==
- 2009 in paleontology
- List of plesiosaur genera
- Timeline of plesiosaur research
