= María Páramo =

Colombian geologist (1963–2025)

- Born: 1963; Bogotá, Colombia
- Died: 5 January 2025 (aged 61)
- Education: Universidad Nacional de Colombia (MSc.)
- Alma mater: Université de Poitiers (PhD)
- Known for: Vertebrate paleontology
- Scientific career
- Fields: Geology, Palaeontology, Paleoecology, Taphonomy
- Institutions: Universidad Nacional de Colombia; INGEOMINAS
- Thesis: Les Vertébrés marins du Turonien de la Vallée Supérieure du Magdalena, Colombie, Systématique, Paléoécologie et Paléobiogéographie (1997)

María Euridice Páramo Fonseca (1963 – 5 January 2025) was a Colombian paleontologist and geologist. She contributed to paleontology in Colombia in the fields of describing various Cretaceous marine reptiles, most notably the mosasaurs Eonatator and Yaguarasaurus, the ichthyosaur Kyhytysuka, and the plesiosaurs Leivanectes and Stenorhynchosaurus.

== Life and career ==
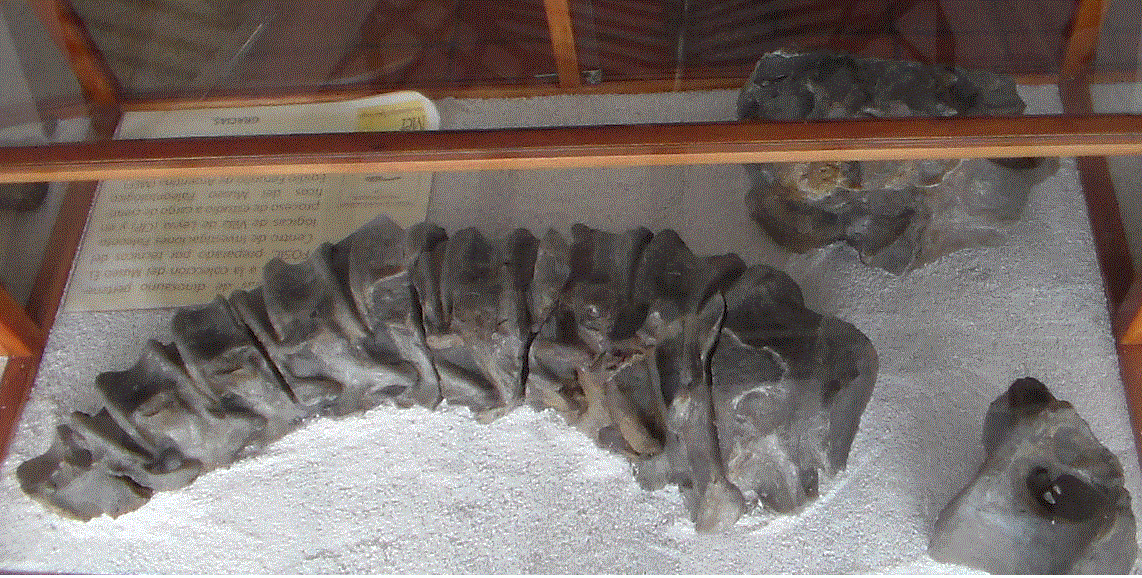
Páramo co-authored the publication about Padillasaurus leivaensis, the first dinosaur fossil found in Colombia

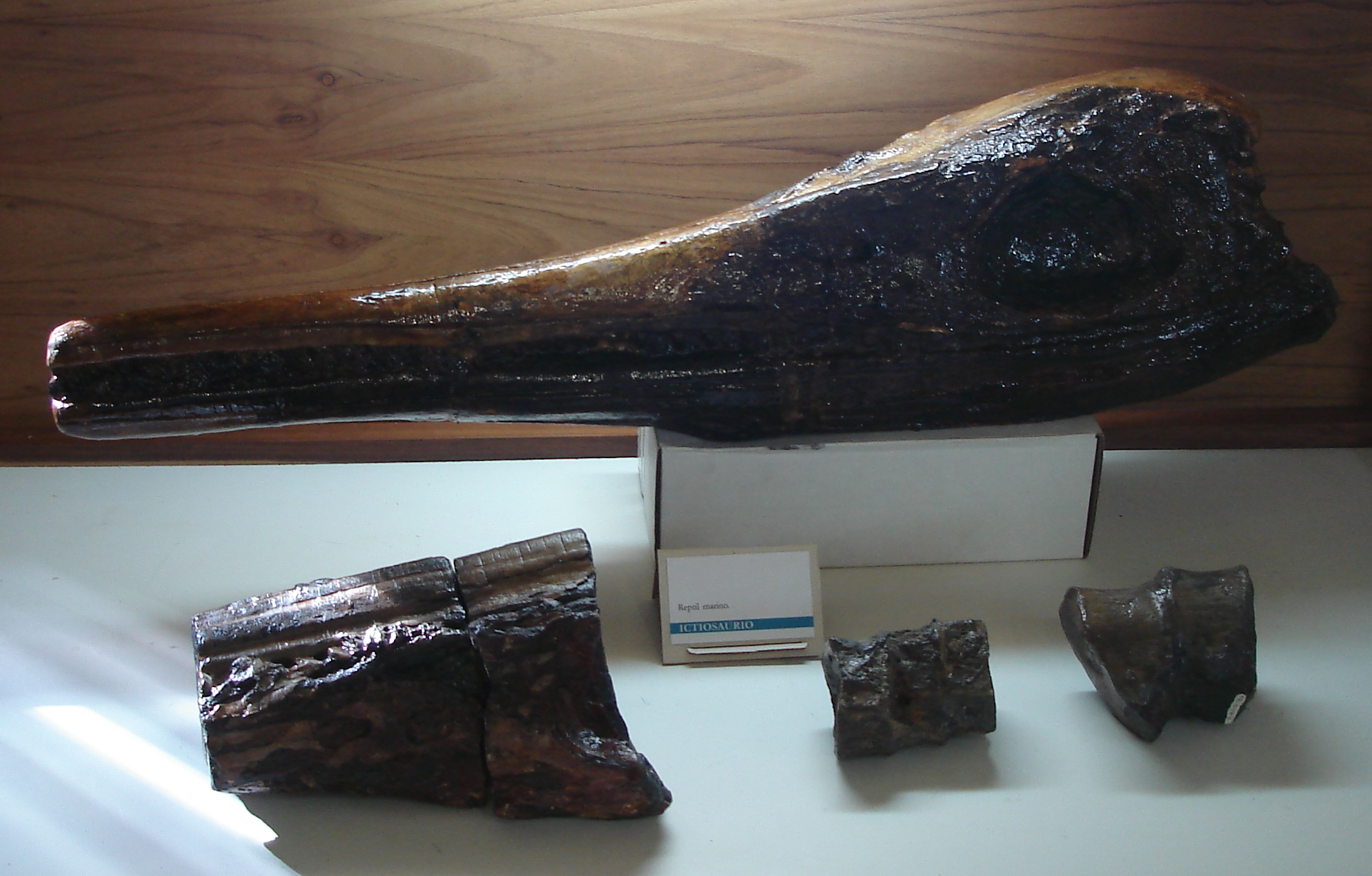
Skull of Kyhytysuka sachicarum

In 1991, Páramo obtained her BSc. degree from the Universidad Nacional de Colombia with a dissertation titled Posición Sistemática de un reptil marino con base en los restos fósiles encontrados en capas del Cretácico Superior en Yaguará, Huila and her PhD degree in 1997 from the Université de Poitiers with a thesis Les Vertébrés marins du Turonien de la Vallée Supérieure du Magdalena, Colombie, Systématique, Paléoécologie et Paléobiogéographie. With "Mention d'Honneur avec félicitations" for doctoral thesis. María Páramo lectured and conducted research in the Department of Geosciences at the Universidad Nacional de Colombia in Bogotá since 2006. Páramo helped establish a foundation for the preservation and rescue of fossils in the region of Colombia, along with other researchers and contributors.

Páramo, together with fellow paleontologist Fernando Etayo, collaborated in describing the first dinosaur fossil found in Colombia, Padillasaurus leivaensis from the Paja Formation, close to Villa de Leyva, Boyacá.

Other species described by Páramo are the mosasaur Eonatator coellensis from Coello, Tolima, the pliosaur Stenorhynchosaurus munozi, and ichthyosaur Platypterigius sachicarum (now Kyhytysuka sachicarum) from the Paja Formation, Platypterygius, fossil fish species Bachea huilensis from the Villeta Group, and Gomphotheres from Pleistocene beds close to Cartagena. One of the most complete discoveries in South America, the mosasaur Yaguarasaurus columbianus from the La Frontera Formation, Huila, is mainly found in South America, but has been identified globally. Along with Fonseca, in 2000, she collected the tooth of a mosasaur found in layers of the Turonian of the Villeta Formation."

Páramo published in Spanish, French and English. She died on 5 January 2025

== Works ==
This is a list of publications.

=== Articles ===
- 2019 – A new late Aptian elasmosaurid from the Paja Formation, Villa de Leiva, Colombia
- 2018 – Appendicular remains of an ophthalmosaurid ichthyosaur from the lower Barremian of Villa de Leiva, Colombia
- 2016 – Stenorhynchosaurus munozi, gen. et sp. nov. a new pliosaurid from the Upper Barremian (Lower Cretaceous) of Villa de Leiva, Colombia, South America
- 2013 – Eonatator coellensis nov. sp. (Squamata: Mosasauridae), a new species from the Upper Cretaceous of Colombia
- 2012 – Mosasauroids from Colombia
- 2007 – The first Late Pleistocene record of Kinosternon (Cryptodira:Kinosternidae) turtles for Northern South America, Pubenza locality, Colombia
- 2001 – Los peces de la familia Pachyrhizodontidae (Teleostei) del Turoniano del Valle Superior del Magdalena, Colombia, dos nuevas especies
- 2000 – Yaguarasaurus columbianus (Reptilia, Mosasauridae), a primitive mosasaur from the Turonian (Upper Cretaceous) of Colombia
- 1998 – Platypterigius sachicarum (Reptilia, Ichthyosauria), nueva especie del Cretácico de Colombia
- 1997 – Bachea huilensis nov. gen., nov. sp., premier Tselfatioidei (Teleostei) de Colombie

== See also ==
- Geology of the Altiplano Cundiboyacense
- Geology of the Eastern Hills of Bogotá
- Bogotá Formation
- Paja Formation
- La Frontera Formation
- Fernando Etayo

== Notable works by Páramo ==
- Páramo Fonseca, María Euridice; O'Gorman, José Patricio; Gasparini, Zulma; Padilla, Santiago; Parra Ruge, Mary Luz (2019), "A new late Aptian elasmosaurid from the Paja Formation, Villa de Leiva, Colombia", Cretaceous Research, in press: _
- Páramo Fonseca, María Eurídice (2018), "Restos apendiculares de un ictiosaurio oftalmosáurido del Barremiano inferior de Villa de Leiva, Colombia", Boletín de Geología, 40: 15–30, doi:10.18273/revbol.v40n1-2018001
- Páramo, María E.; Gómez Pérez, Marcela; Noé, Leslie F.; Etayo, Fernando (2016), "Stenorhynchosaurus munozi, gen. et sp. nov. a new pliosaurid from the Upper Barremian (Lower Cretaceous) of Villa de Leiva, Colombia, South America", Revista de la Academia Colombiana de Ciencias Exactas, Físicas y Naturales, 40 (154): 84–103, doi:10.18257/raccefyn.239
- Carballido, José L.; Pol, Diego; Parra Ruge, Mary L.; Padilla Bernal, Santiago; Páramo Fonseca, María E.; Etayo Serna, Fernando (2015), "A new Early Cretaceous brachiosaurid (Dinosauria, Neosauropoda) from northwestern Gondwana (Villa de Leiva, Colombia)", Journal of Vertebrate Paleontology, 35 (5) e980505, Bibcode:2015JVPal..35E0505C, doi:10.1080/02724634.2015.980505
- Páramo Fonseca, María Euridice (2013), "Eonatator coellensis nov. sp. (Squamata: Mosasauridae), a new species from the Upper Cretaceous of Colombia" (PDF), Revista Académica Colombiana de Ciencias Naturales, XXXVII: 499–518
- Páramo Fonseca, María Euridice; Escobar Quemba, Ingrid Carolina (2010), "Restos mandibulares de mastodonte encontrados en cercanías de Cartagena, Colombia" (PDF), Geología Colombiana, 35: 50–57
- Páramo Fonseca, María Euridice (2001), "Los peces de la familia Pachyrhizodontidae (Teleostei) del Turoniano del Valle Superior del Magdalena", Boletín Geológico, 39 (1–3): 51–83, doi:10.32685/0120-1425/bolgeol39.1-3.2001.190
- Páramo Fonseca, María Euridice (2000), "Yaguarasaurus columbianus (Reptilia, Mosasauridae), a primitive mosasaur from the Turonian (Upper Cretaceous) of Colombia", Historical Biology, 14 (1–2): 121–131, Bibcode:2000HBio...14..121P, doi:10.1080/10292380009380560
- Páramo, María E (1998), "Platypterygius sachicarum (Reptilia, Ichthyosauria) nueva especie del Cretácico de Colombia", Revista INGEOMINAS, 6: 1–12
- Páramo, María (1997), "Bachea huilensis nov. gen., nov. sp., premier Tselfatioidei (Teleostei) de Colombie", Comptes Rendus de l'Académie des Sciences, Série IIA, 325 (2): 147–150, Bibcode:1997CRASE.325..147P, doi:10.1016/S1251-8050(97)83976-6
