= Leivanectes =

Leivanectes Temporal range: Late Aptian ~115–112 Ma

Scientific classification
- Kingdom: Animalia
- Phylum: Chordata
- Class: Reptilia
- Superorder: †Sauropterygia
- Order: †Plesiosauria
- Superfamily: †Plesiosauroidea
- Family: †Elasmosauridae
- Genus: †Leivanectes; Páramo Fonseca et al., 2019
- Species: †L. bernardoi

Binomial name
- †Leivanectes bernardoi Páramo Fonseca et al., 2019

Genus of plesiosaurs

Leivanectes is a genus of plesiosaurs of the family Elasmosauridae known from Late Aptian marine deposits in central Colombia. It contains a single species, L. bernadoi, which was described in 2019.

== Description ==
Leivanectes differs from Callawayasaurus, which has been found in the same formation, in having fewer mandibular alveoli and a short mandibular symphysis with three alveoli (five in Callawayasaurus).

== Distribution ==
Leivanectes remains have been found in the fossiliferous Paja Formation of the Altiplano Cundiboyacense, which crops out near Villa de Leyva, also written as Villa de Leiva, Boyaca, Colombia. The genus name refers to Villa de Leiva.

== See also ==
- List of plesiosaur genera
- Timeline of plesiosaur research
