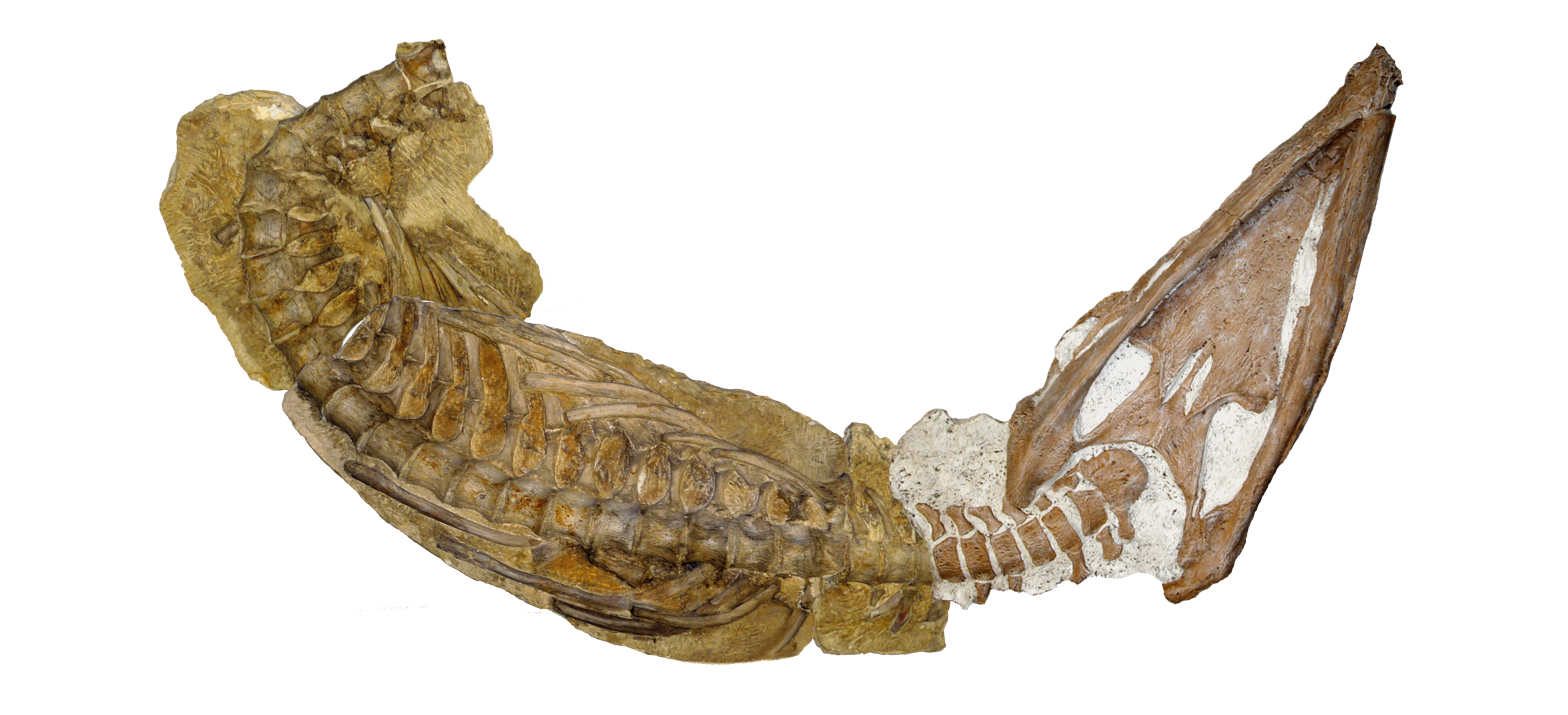
- Holotype specimen of B. lucasi (USNM 4989), as view in its original position

Scientific classification
- Kingdom: Animalia
- Phylum: Chordata
- Class: Reptilia
- Superorder: †Sauropterygia
- Order: †Plesiosauria
- Suborder: †Pliosauroidea
- Family: †Pliosauridae
- Subfamily: †Brachaucheninae
- Genus: †Brachauchenius; Williston, 1903

Type species
- †Brachauchenius lucasi Williston, 1903

= Brachauchenius =

Brachauchenius Temporal range: Late Cretaceous, 100–90 Ma

Extinct genus of reptiles

Brachauchenius (meaning 'short neck') is an extinct genus of pliosaurs that lived during the Late Cretaceous in what are now North America and North Africa. Only one species is known, B. lucasi, initially described by Samuel Wendell Williston in 1903 from a partial fossil skeleton discovered in a quarry in Kansas, United States. Many other fossil specimens attributed to the species were subsequently discovered, including an individual from Morocco whose presence was made official in 2016. Many contemporary pliosaur specimens were formerly attributed to Brachauchenius, but have since been reidentified as belonging to other genera or are recognized as indeterminate.

== Research history ==
=== Holotype and naming ===
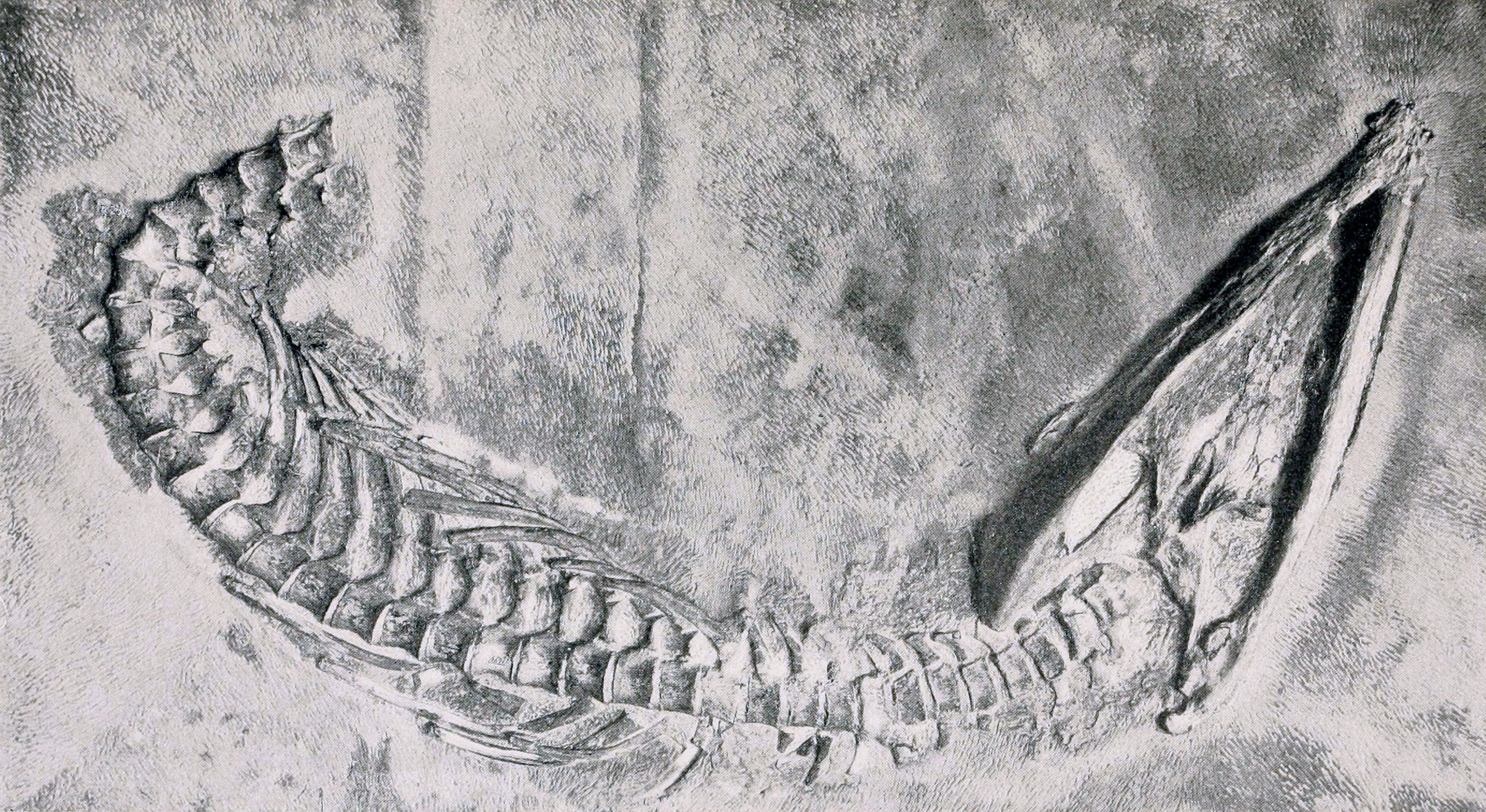
The holotype specimen of B. lucasi (USNM 4989), as figured by Samuel Wendell Williston in 1907

In 1884, a partial skeleton of a marine reptile was discovered by the owner of a quarry near Delphos, in Ottawa County, Kansas. News of this find thus reached Charles H. Sternberg, who was then collecting fossils for Othniel Charles Marsh. Sternberg then wrote several letters to Marsh seeking his permission and funding to exhume the specimen, which he allowed. After exhumation, Sternberg gave the specimen to the Peabody Museum of Natural History for Marsh, but it turned out that Marsh would do little with it. The fossil was eventually transferred to the United States National Museum of Natural History and subsequently given the code name USNM 4989. This same specimen consists of a nearly complete skull measuring 90 cm (35 in) long, followed by thirty-seven vertebrae and associated ribs. Historical documentation from the museum where the specimen has since resided notes that Sternberg was allegedly helped by a certain "John Potts" in its exhumation. In 1903, Samuel Wendell Williston designated the fossil as the holotype of a new plesiosaur genus and species under the name Brachauchenius lucasi. The generic name Brachauchenius derives from the Ancient Greek words βραχύς (brakhys, "short") and αὐχήν (aukhḗn, "neck"), followed by the Latin suffix ius, all meaning "short neck". Williston chose this name because this specimen was considered the shortest-necked plesiosaur ever described. The specific name lucasi is named in honor of Frederic Augustus Lucas for his notable contributions to American paleontology.

In his article, Williston only mentions the origin locality of the specimen, and does not detail any elements regarding the discovery of the latter. Thus, the circumstances surrounding the discovery of USNM 4989 remained unclear until 2007, when letters from Sternberg obtained by Kenneth Carpenter were formalized in an article written by his colleague Michael J. Everhart. The stratigraphic provenance of the holotype specimen remained also uncertain for decades. Williston notes that it comes from the "Benton Cretaceous", but it turns out that three geological formations outcrop the locality where the specimen was discovered. In 1996, Carpenter listed the specimen as coming from the Greenhorn Limestone, but he does not, however, support any evidence for this assertion. A microscopic examination of the fossils published in 2005 revealed that the specimen came from either the upper level of the Greenhorn Limestone or the lower level of the Fairport Chalk Member of the Carlile Shale, suggesting that the specimen dates to the early Middle Turonian.

=== Further specimens ===
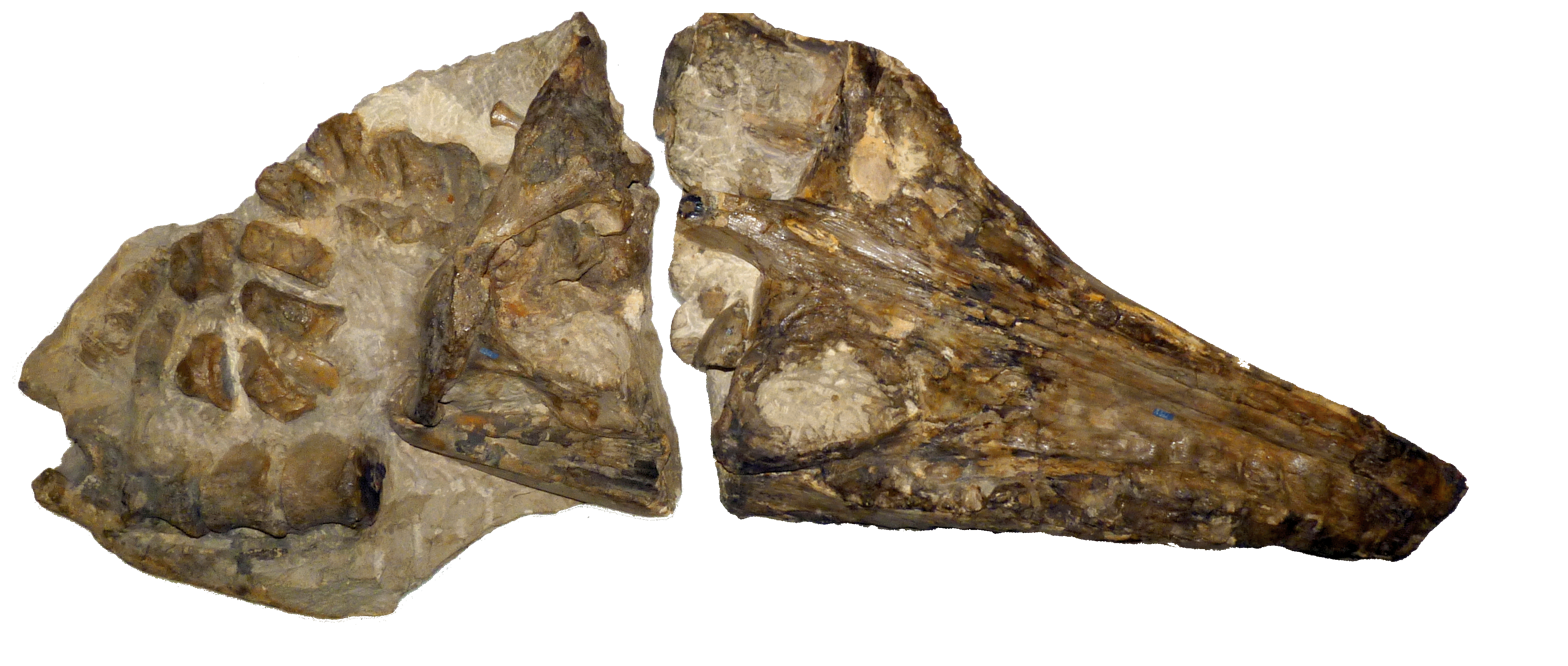
The second known specimen of B. lucasi (USNM 2361)

In 2016, a pliosaur mandible from Turonian deposits near Goulmima, Morocco were referred to the species Brachauchenius lucasi.

=== Formerly attributed specimens ===
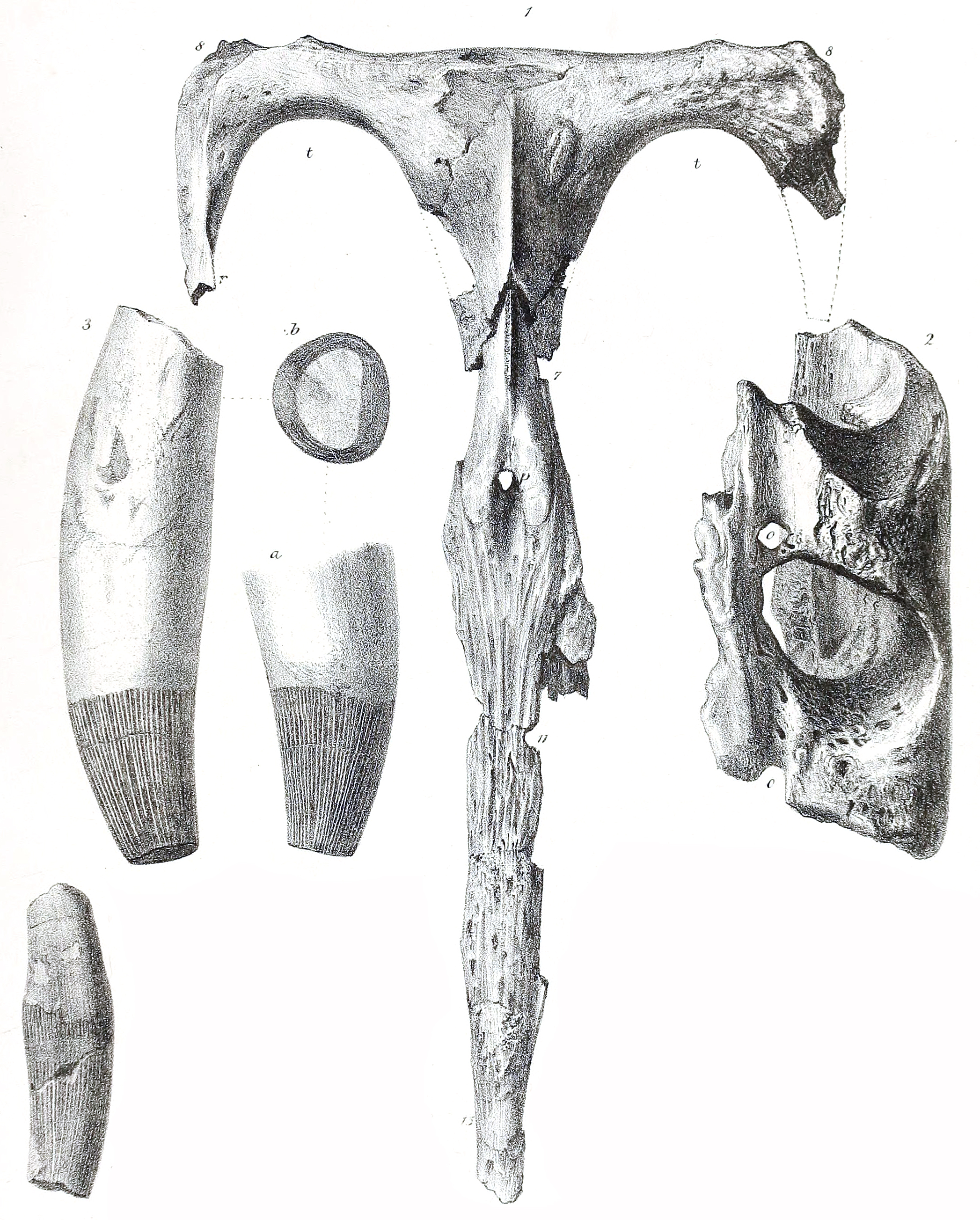
DOKDM G/1–2, a partial skull attributed to Polyptychodon, which was briefly assigned to Brachauchenius in a 2013 study

In 1860, Richard Owen documented a partial skull having been discovered around an unspecified date by George Cubitt in Cretaceous sediments from the town of Dorking, in the county of Surrey, England. Based on teeth characteristics, Owen referred this specimen to Polyptychodon interruptus, a species of pliosaurid that he himself had already named in 1841 from fossils dating from the same period which were discovered in the counties of Sussex and Kent. The following year, Owen cited that the specimen was discovered during the construction of a railway tunnel through the Chalk Group, near Frome, Somerset. However, this locality was most likely confused with those of other specimens assigned to this genus, and with multiple reported evidence, it seems more likely that the first locality originally mentioned is the most likely. This specimen has since resided in the local museum of Dorking, where it is cataloged as DOKDM G/1-2. (Note: Some sources list the specimen code name as DORK/G/1-2.) In a phylogenetic study published in 2013, Roger B. J. Benson and colleagues recovered it as being close to several other specimens assigned to Brachauchenius, and therefore suggested that it would be better to refer it to that genus as well, although without specific affiliation. In his revision of Polyptychodon published in 2016, Daniel Madzia designates this genus as a nomen dubium due to the lack of accessibility and diagnostics regarding the holotype tooth of the taxon, the latter having possibly even been lost. However, he considers it likely that DOKDM G/1-2 could be designated as the neotype of this genus in order to maintain its validity, but he refrains from doing so at this time since the descriptions provided by Owen are obsolete. In a 2017 conference, Madzia and colleagues judge the Dorking specimen to be potentially diagnostic despite its incomplete preservation.

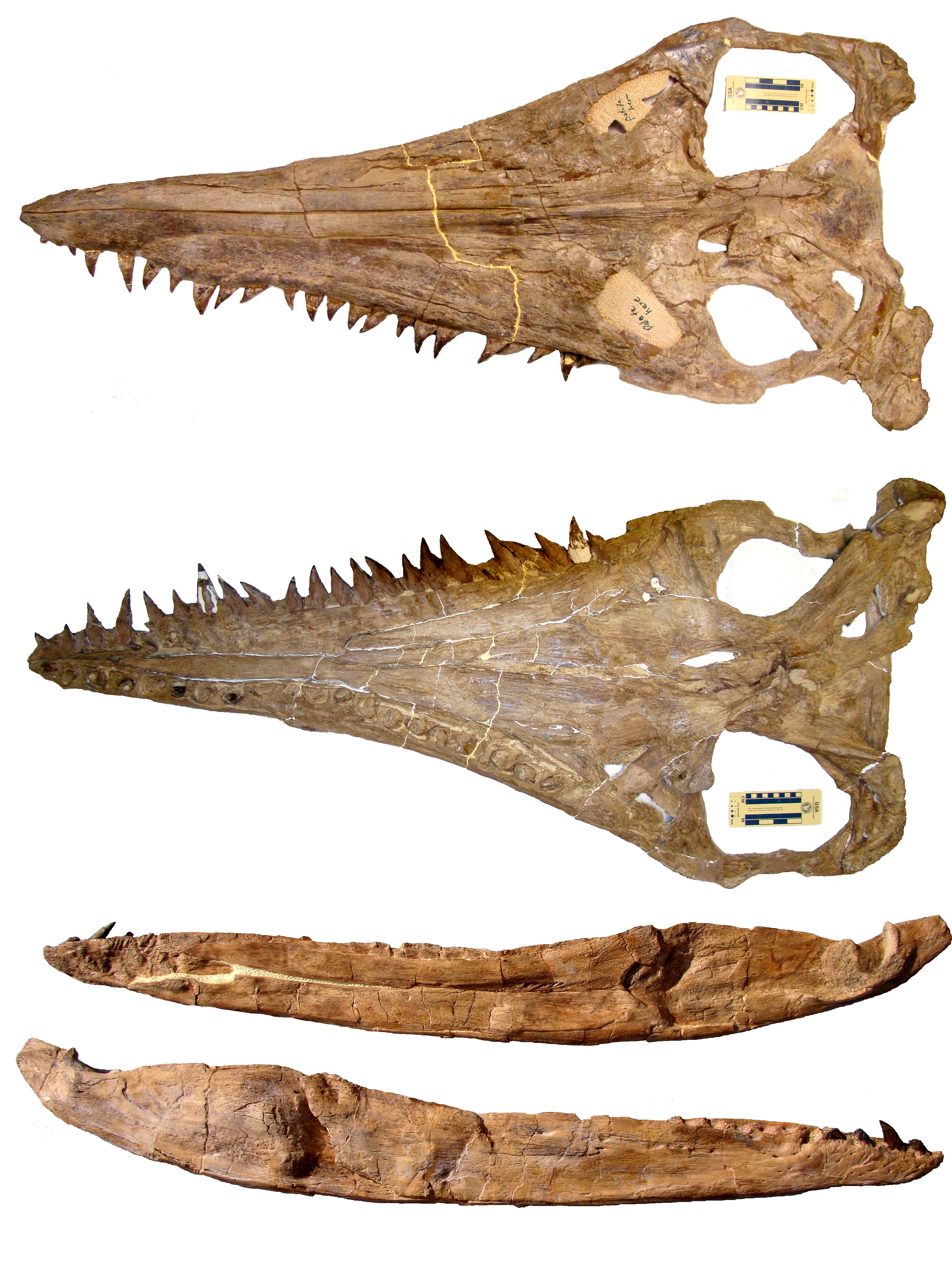
FHSM VP-321, the holotype skull of Megacephalosaurus, once considered as one of the largest specimens of Brachauchenius

All recognized fossils of the related and contemporary genus Megacephalosaurus were first interpreted as coming from Brachauchenius. The holotype specimen of the genus, cataloged as FHSM VP-321, was discovered in 1950 by teenage brothers Frank and Robert Jennrich near Fairport, Kansas. The Jenrich brothers, aided by George F. Sternberg and a local cow rancher named Jim Rouse, exhumed the skull later that year. Although initially thinking the specimen would be a mosasaur, G. F. Sternberg later identified it as an imposing specimen of B. lucasi, placing the skull and mandible on a single support showing only their dorsal sides. However, it was in 1996 that the skull was first described by Carpenter, who still identified it as such. A new expedition carried out in November 2003 by R. Jennrich led scientists to discover that the specimen was exhumed from Fairport Chalk. In 2007, Everhart discovered photos of the skull's underside taken prior to its mounting, which revealed underside features that were different from those found in other B. lucasi skulls. The specimen is then removed from its mount, and is officially described in 2013 by Bruce A. Schumacher, Carpenter and Everhart as the holotype of a new genus and species which they name Megacephalosaurus eulerti. Shortly before the description made by Schumacher et al., the phylogenetic study by Benson et al. classified the taxon as B. eulerti. The history of the paratype skull, cataloged UNSM 50136, is much more obscure. Indeed, the latter presents very little contextual information on its discovery and its precise locality of origin, the only information known is that the specimen also comes from Kansas. It was first described in the scientific literature by Schumacher in 2008, who provisionally identified it under the name aff. B. lucasi. Although its locality of origin is unknown, matrix analysis extracted from the fossil identifies nannofossil assemblages that are associated with limestone deposits of the Greenhorn Formation. When FHSM VP-321 was found to be a distinct genus, USNM 50136 was identified to be conspecific with it and was assigned to be its paratype. Everhart blogged that other specimens currently attributed to Brachauchenius may actually belong to Megacephalosaurus. The most notable specimen in his line of sight being UNSM 112437, a partial skull having been collected from the Graneros Shale.

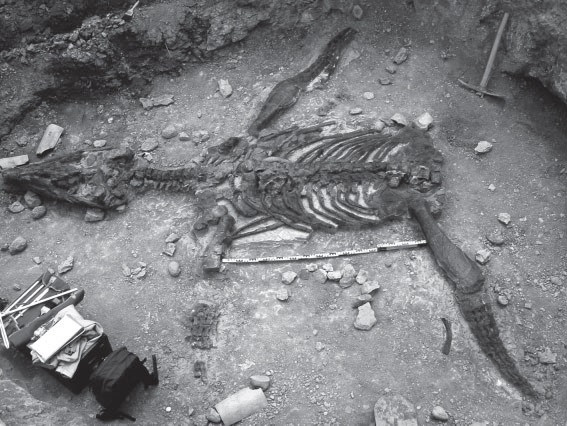
Exhumation of the holotype skeleton of Stenorhynchosaurus, seen as the oldest known representative of the brachauchenines.

In 2000, a relatively complete pliosaurid skeleton, since cataloged as VL17052004-1, was discovered in the town of Villa de Leyva in Boyacá, Colombia, before being exhumed during 2004-2005. Coming from the Paja Formation, it was dated to the Upper Barremian, making the latter the oldest known example of the brachauchenines. The skeleton was first described in 2005 by Oliver Hampe as belonging to Brachauchenius, before being designated as the holotype of a new genus and species under the name Stenorhynchosaurus munozi by María Eurídice Páramo and colleagues in 2016.

== Description ==
Size of B. lucasi compared to a human

Brachauchenius has a morphology typical of the pliosaurids of the thalassophonean group, which has a large elongated skull connected to a short neck, unlike many other plesiosaurs, which have a long neck and a small head. Like all other plesiosaurs, Brachauchenius has a short tail, a massive trunk and two pairs of large flippers. Like most Turonian pliosaurs, the measurement of Brachauchenius is quite modest, the holotype specimen having a maximum length estimated at 5.3 m (17 ft) for a body mass estimated at 2.2 t (2.2 long tons; 2.4 short tons).

== Classification ==
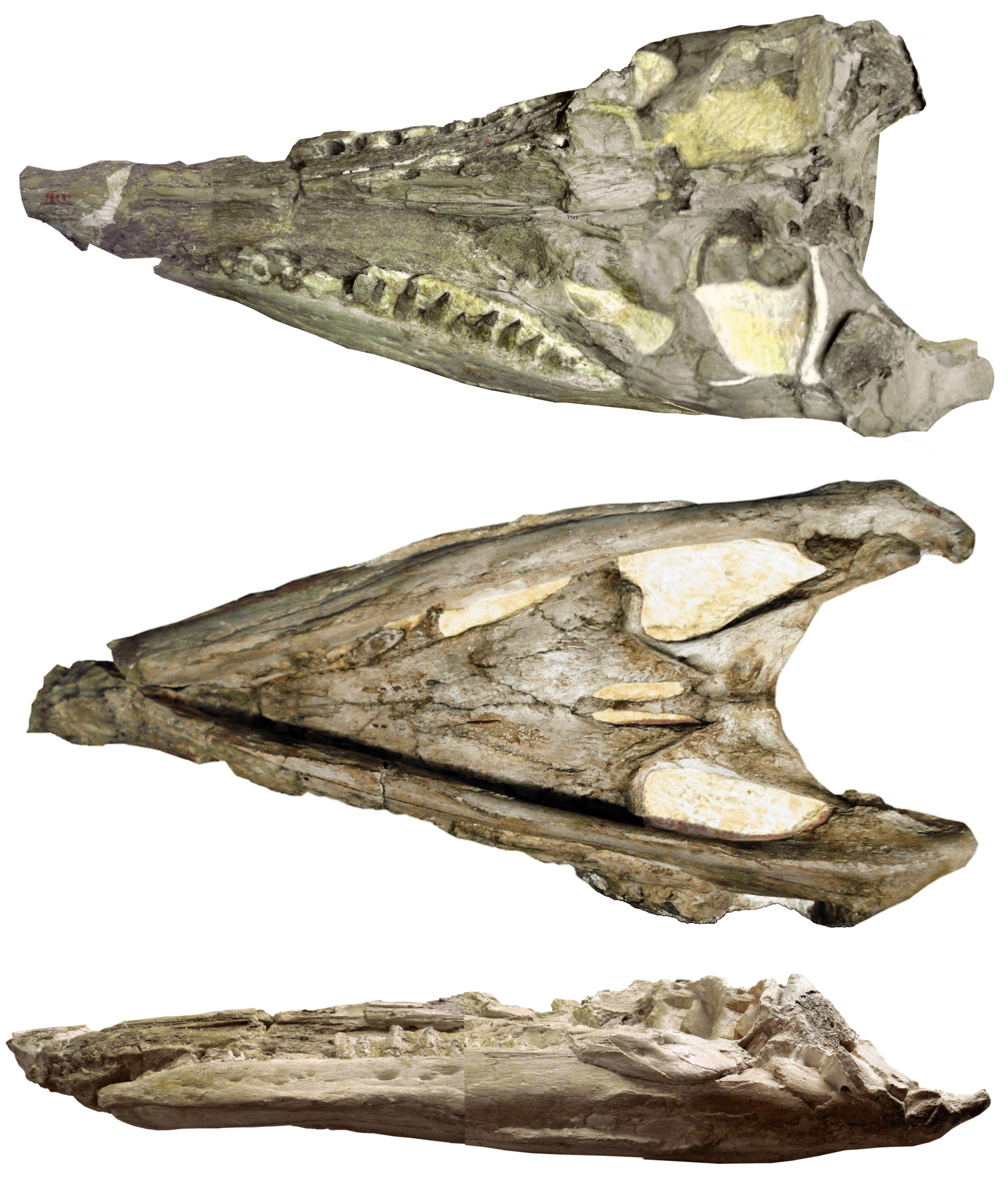
Brachauchenius lucasi holotype skull in dorsal, palatal and lateral views

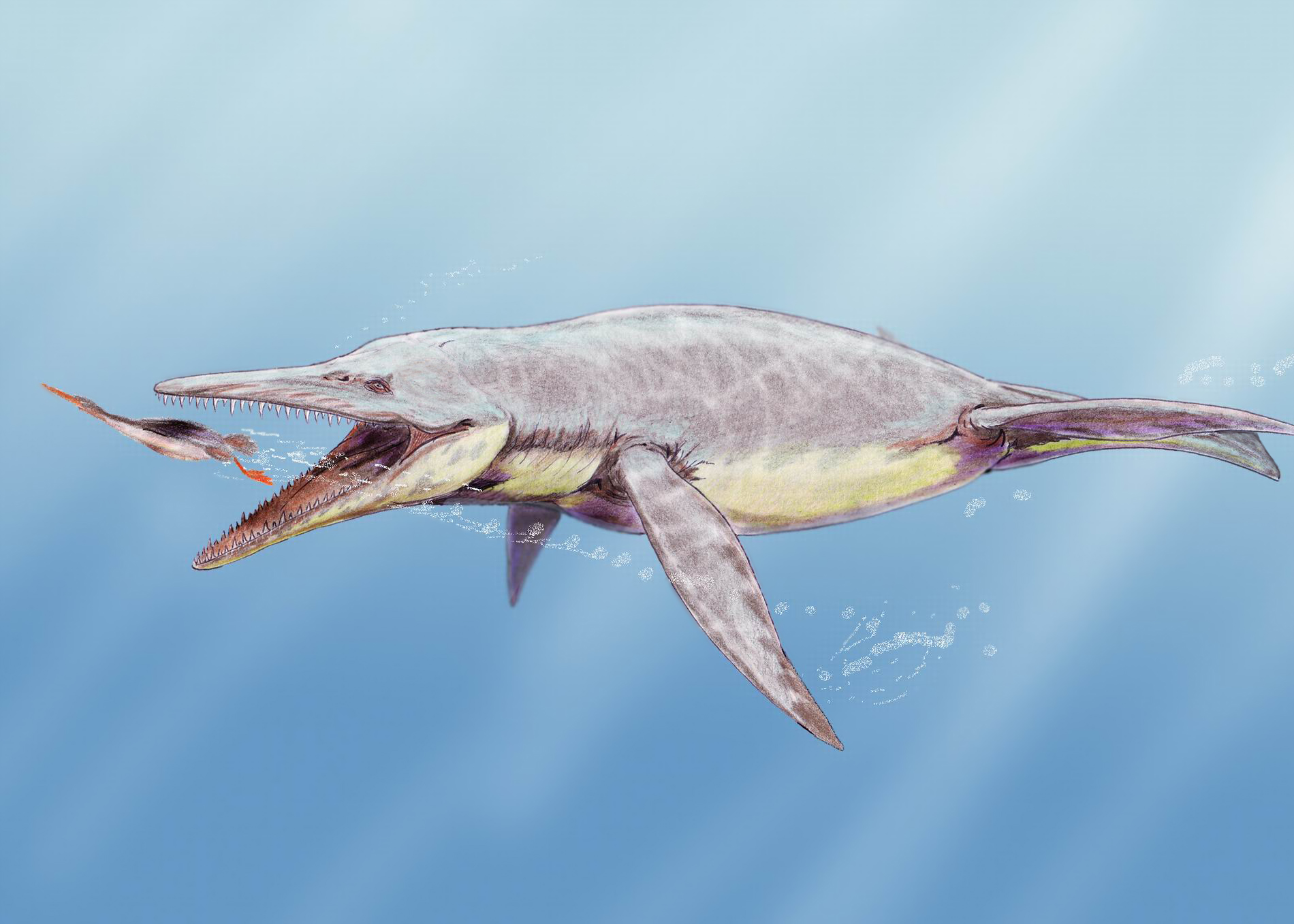
B. lucasi pursuing a hesperornithiform bird

The cladogram below is modified from Madzia et al. (2018):

- Thalassophonea
  - Peloneustes philarchus
  - - 'Pliosaurus' andrewsi
    - - Simolestes vorax
      - - Liopleurodon ferox
        - - Pliosaurus patagonicus
          - Pliosaurus almanzaensis
          - 'Pliosaurus' irgisensis
          - Pliosaurus rossicus
          - Gallardosaurus iturraldei
          - - Pliosaurus brachyspondylus
            - Pliosaurus macromerus
            - Pliosaurus brachydeirus
            - Pliosaurus westburyensis
            - - - Pliosaurus kevani
                - Pliosaurus cf. kevani
              - - Pliosaurus carpenteri
                - Pliosaurus funkei
          - Brachaucheninae
            - Makhaira rossica
            - - Luskhan itilensis
              - - Stenorhynchosaurus munozi
                - - cf. Kronosaurus queenslandicus (QM f51291)
                  - Kronosaurus queenslandicus
                  - - Megacephalosaurus eulerti
                    - 'Polyptychodon interruptus' (DORK/G/1-2)
                    - - cf. Brachauchenius lucasi (MNA V9433)
                      - Brachauchenius lucasi

== See also ==
- List of plesiosaur genera
- Timeline of plesiosaur research
