= Villa de Leyva =

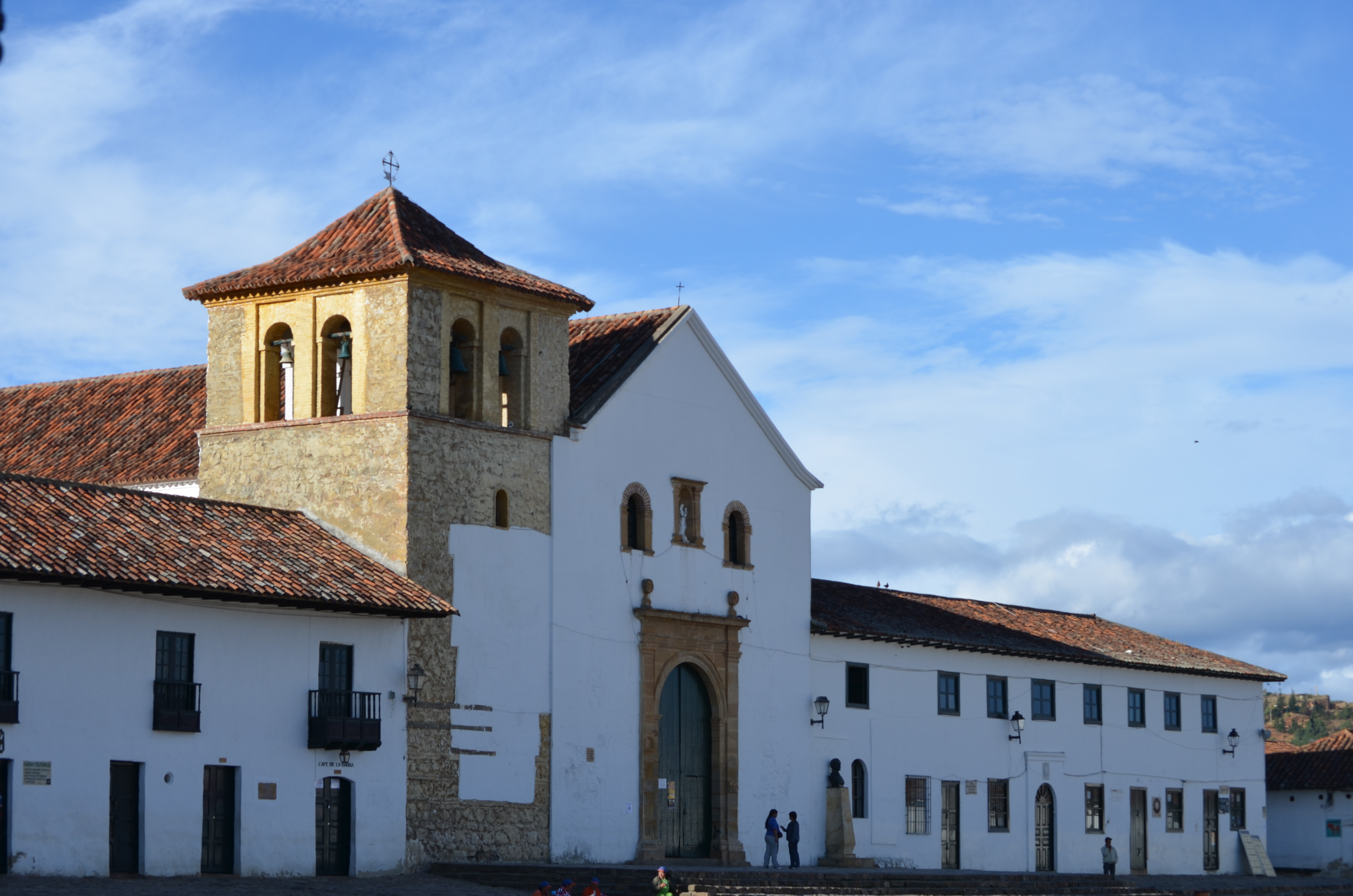
- Church of Nuestra Señora del Rosario

- Flag Coat of arms
- Nicknames: Villa de Nuestra Señora de Santa María de Leyva
- Location of the town of Villa de Leyva and the Leyva municipality in Boyacá Department
- Coordinates: 5°38′N 73°32′W
- Country: Colombia
- Department: Boyacá Department
- Province: Ricaurte Province
- Founded: June 12, 1572
- Founder: André Diaz Venero de Leyva

Government
  - Mayor: Josue Javier Castellanos Morales (2020-2023)

Area
  - City: 128 km^{2} (49 sq mi)
- Elevation: 2,149 m (7,051 ft)

Population (2015)
  - City: 16,984
  - Density: 133/km^{2} (344/sq mi)
  - Urban: 9,926
- Time zone: UTC-5 (Colombia Standard Time)
- Website: Official website

Villa de Leyva, also called Villa de Leiva, is a touristic colonial town and municipality, in the Ricaurte Province, part of the Boyacá Department of Colombia. The town is a Colombian National Heritage Town and is on the tentative list for UNESCO World Heritage Sites. Villa de Leyva is located 37 kilometres (23 mi) west of the departmental capital Tunja.

Located away from major trade routes in a high altitude valley of semi-desert terrain, and with no mineral deposits nearby to exploit, the town has undergone little development in the last 400 years. As a consequence, it is one of the few towns in Colombia to have preserved completely its original colonial style and architecture: the streets and large central plaza are still paved with cobblestones, and many buildings date from the sixteenth century. This has resulted in Villa de Leyva becoming one of Colombia's principal tourist attractions, and it was declared a National Monument on December 17, 1954 to preserve its architecture. The town and the surrounding countryside, which contains several sites of interest, are popular weekend destinations for citizens of Bogotá, and attract an increasing number of foreign tourists.

As a result of its cool temperatures, dry climate, and rich soil, Villa de Leyva has established itself as a wine region, with the emergence of a number of wineries around the town in recent years.

== Geography ==
The urban centre of Villa de Leyva is located in an intermontane valley on the Altiplano Cundiboyacense at 2,149 metres (7,051 ft).

== History ==
The area of Villa de Leyva was inhabited early in the inhabitation of the Altiplano Cundiboyacense. The earliest archaeological evidence has been surfaced around El Infiernito, an archeoastronomical site dating back to pre-Herrera times. The Muisca were the inhabitants of the area at the time of the Spanish conquest and the zaque of Hunza ruled over the area of Villa de Leyva.

The town was founded on June 12, 1572 by and named after the first president of the New Kingdom of Granada, Andrés Díaz Venero de Leiva.

== Arts and culture ==
There are several festivals held throughout the year, including a gastronomical festival in November, the water festival, the tree festival, the Villa de Leyva Jazz Festival in July, the International Kite-flying Festival in August, the onion beauty pageant in October, and the Festival of Lights on December 7. There are also several musical, painting and theatre events which are available throughout the whole year. As a gastronomic destination, restaurants tend to have live music bands or singers. There are also enjoyable storytellers who perform weekly in the main square for the entertainment of usual pedestrians or tourists. It is also common to rent bikes for historical tours of the town and its outskirts

== Tourism ==
The focus of the town is the Plaza Mayor, which at 14,000 square meters is the largest square in Colombia and believed to be the largest entirely cobbled square in South America.

The town's most famous son is Antonio Ricaurte (1797–1814), a captain in Simon Bolivar's army fighting for independence, and who died in a famous act of self-sacrifice at San Mateo in what is now Venezuela. The house in which he was born, on the Plazuela de San Agustín, was acquired by Colombia's Air Force in 1977 and turned into a military museum.

Villa de Leyva has also been home to two other well-known figures in Colombian history. Antonio Nariño, best known for translating The Rights of Man into Spanish and a leading advocate for Colombian independence, lived the last few years of his life and died in Villa de Leyva. Luis Alberto Acuña (1904 – 1993), one of the most important Colombian artists of the 20th century, also spent his final years in the town. The houses of both men are now museums containing their personal properties, and in the case of Acuña, a selection of his works, including two murals on the walls of the internal patio.

The House of the First Congress, where the First Congress of the United Provinces of Nueva Granada met on October 4, 1812, is located on the north corner of the main plaza. It is currently the site of the municipal council.

A few miles further west is a Muisca astronomy observatory, made of phallic stones, colloquially named El Infiernito ("little hell" in Spanish), as the Spanish conquistadors were horrified by the stones and proclaimed that the Muisca would be banished to hell for their obscene representations.

To the north-east of Villa de Leyva, the land rises to cloud-forest and includes the national park of Iguaque, and a group of seven waterfalls collectively named La Periquera, 15 kilometres (9.3 mi) from the town centre.

Villa de Leyva was named a Pueblo Patrimonio (heritage town) of Colombia in 2010. It was among 11 municipalities nationwide that were selected to be part of the Red Turística de Pueblos Patrimonio original cohort.

== Paleontology ==
Near Villa de Leyva are several other sites of interest. The valley in which the town is located is rich in fossils from the Paja Formation (Cretaceous period), the most famous being a near-complete Monquirasaurus discovered in 1977 about 3 miles (4.8 km) west of Villa de Leyva. Known simply as El Fósil, the fossil was left in situ where it was discovered and a museum was built around it: another smaller Monquirasaurus fossil was discovered nearby and brought to the museum to be displayed alongside the larger specimen. In the same formation the fossil ichthyosaurs Platypterygius sachicarum and Muiscasaurus catheti and the brachiosaur Padillasaurus leivaensis and pliosaur Brachauchenius, later reclassified as Stenorhynchosaurus, have been discovered.

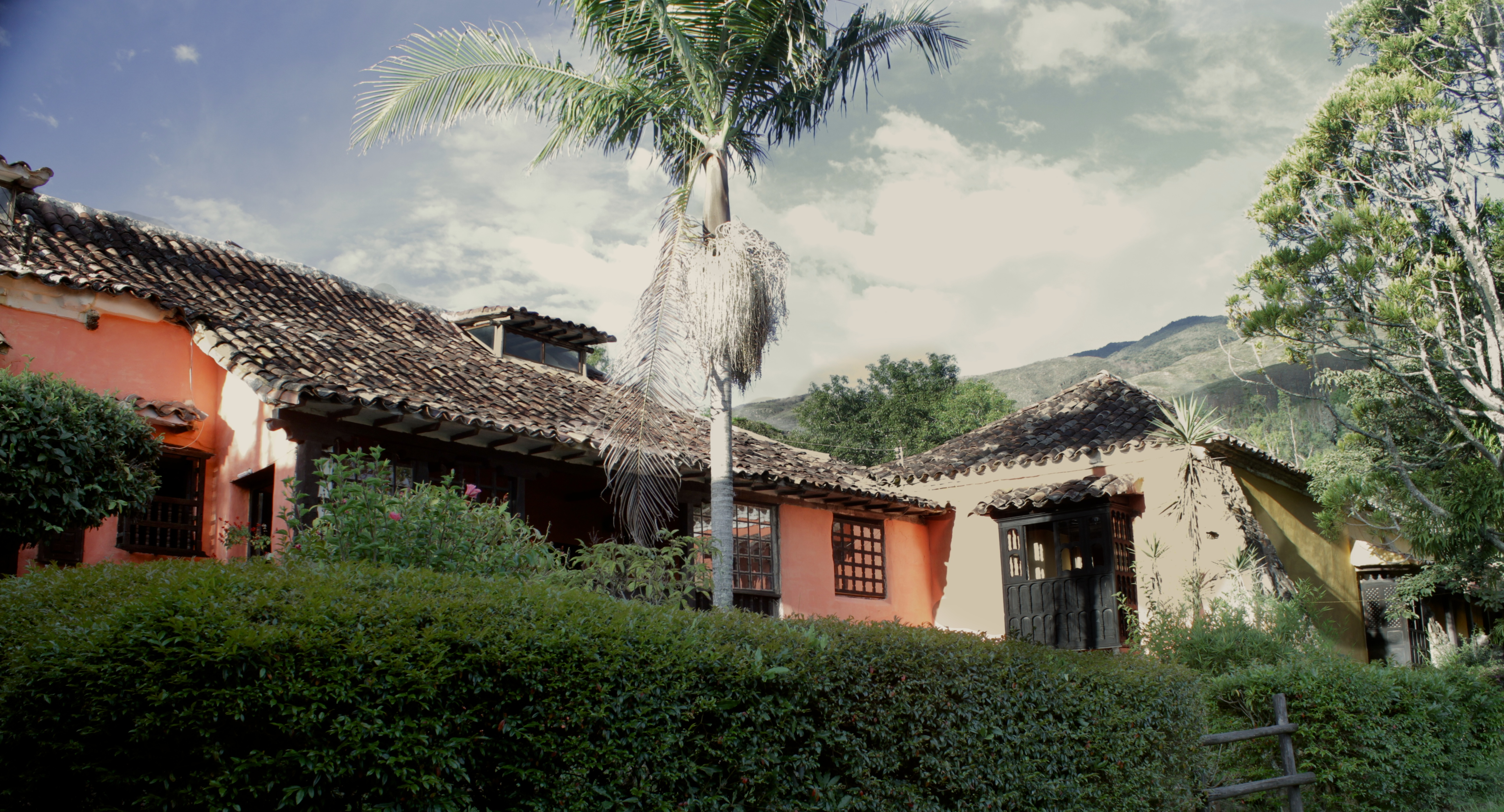
Oldest Building in Town, 1568

== Climate ==
Climate data for Villa de Leyva, elevation 2,215 m (7,267 ft), (1981–2010)
Month	Jan	Feb	Mar	Apr	May	Jun	Jul	Aug	Sep	Oct	Nov	Dec	Year
Mean daily maximum °C (°F)	23.4 (74.1)	23.7 (74.7)	23.6 (74.5)	23.2 (73.8)	23.0 (73.4)	22.5 (72.5)	22.3 (72.1)	22.6 (72.7)	23.0 (73.4)	22.9 (73.2)	22.4 (72.3)	22.9 (73.2)	23.0 (73.4)
Daily mean °C (°F)	16.7 (62.1)	17.1 (62.8)	17.2 (63.0)	17.3 (63.1)	17.2 (63.0)	17.1 (62.8)	16.8 (62.2)	16.9 (62.4)	17.0 (62.6)	16.7 (62.1)	16.7 (62.1)	16.6 (61.9)	16.9 (62.4)
Mean daily minimum °C (°F)	10.0 (50.0)	10.7 (51.3)	11.3 (52.3)	11.8 (53.2)	11.8 (53.2)	11.3 (52.3)	10.8 (51.4)	10.9 (51.6)	10.8 (51.4)	11.0 (51.8)	11.3 (52.3)	10.7 (51.3)	11.0 (51.8)
Average precipitation mm (inches)	50.2 (1.98)	71.1 (2.80)	115.3 (4.54)	123.0 (4.84)	106.7 (4.20)	41.8 (1.65)	39.7 (1.56)	40.2 (1.58)	67.4 (2.65)	148.9 (5.86)	119.2 (4.69)	83.0 (3.27)	997.2 (39.26)
Average precipitation days (≥ 1.0 mm)	9	11	14	16	15	10	10	9	11	17	17	12	149
Average relative humidity (%)	75	74	76	77	77	75	73	71	72	77	79	77	75
Mean monthly sunshine hours	195.3	163.7	151.9	120.0	133.3	141.0	158.1	158.1	141.0	133.3	135.0	167.4	1,798.1
Mean daily sunshine hours	6.3	5.8	4.9	4.0	4.3	4.7	5.1	5.1	4.7	4.3	4.5	5.4	4.9
Source: Instituto de Hidrologia Meteorologia y Estudios Ambientales

== Gallery ==
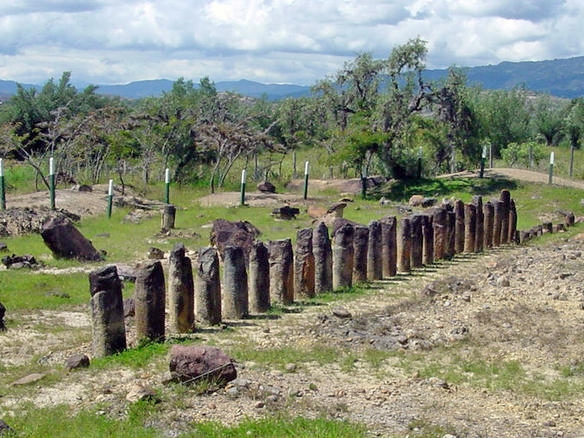
El Infiernito, pre-Columbian archaeoastronomical site

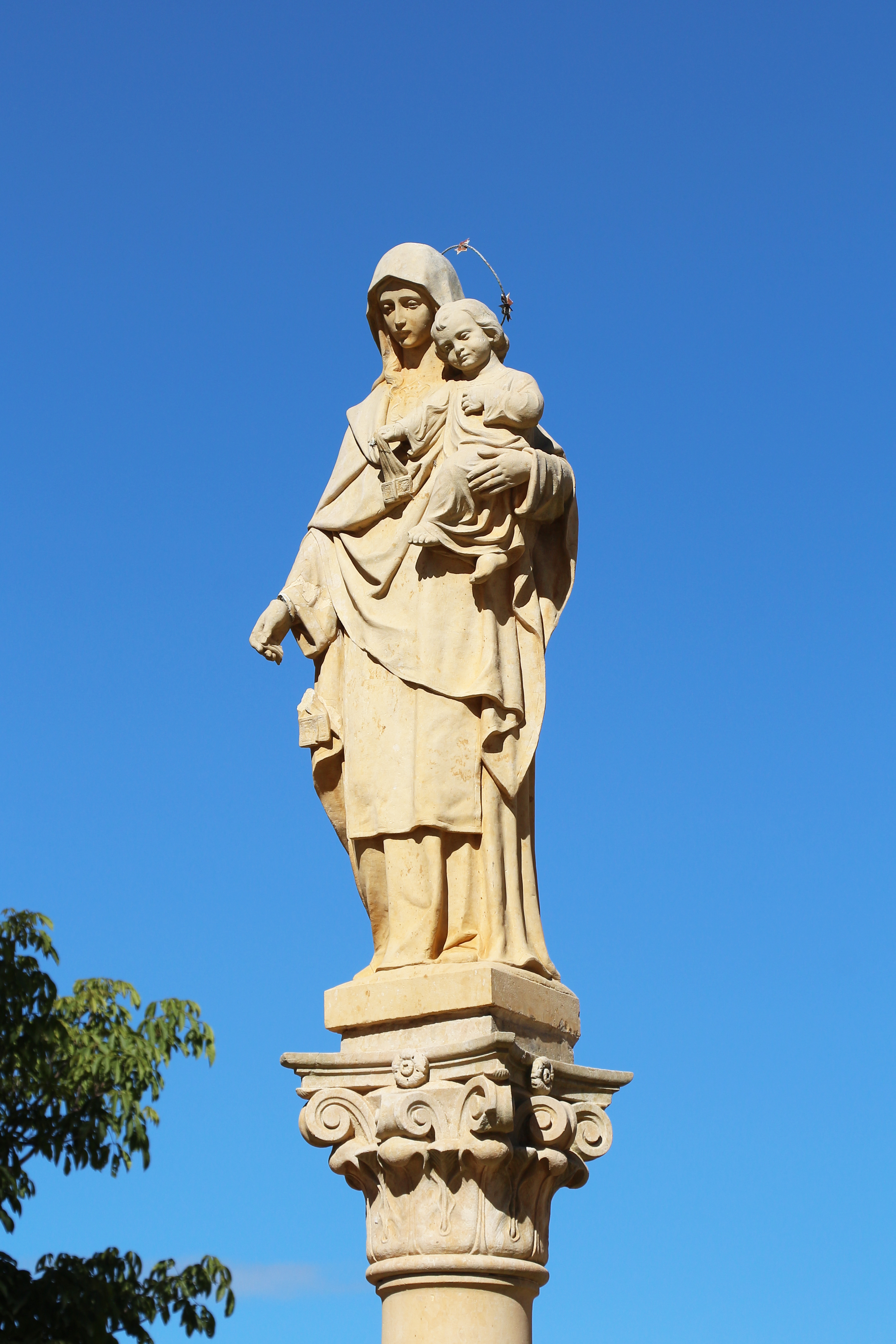
Sculpture of Madonna and Child

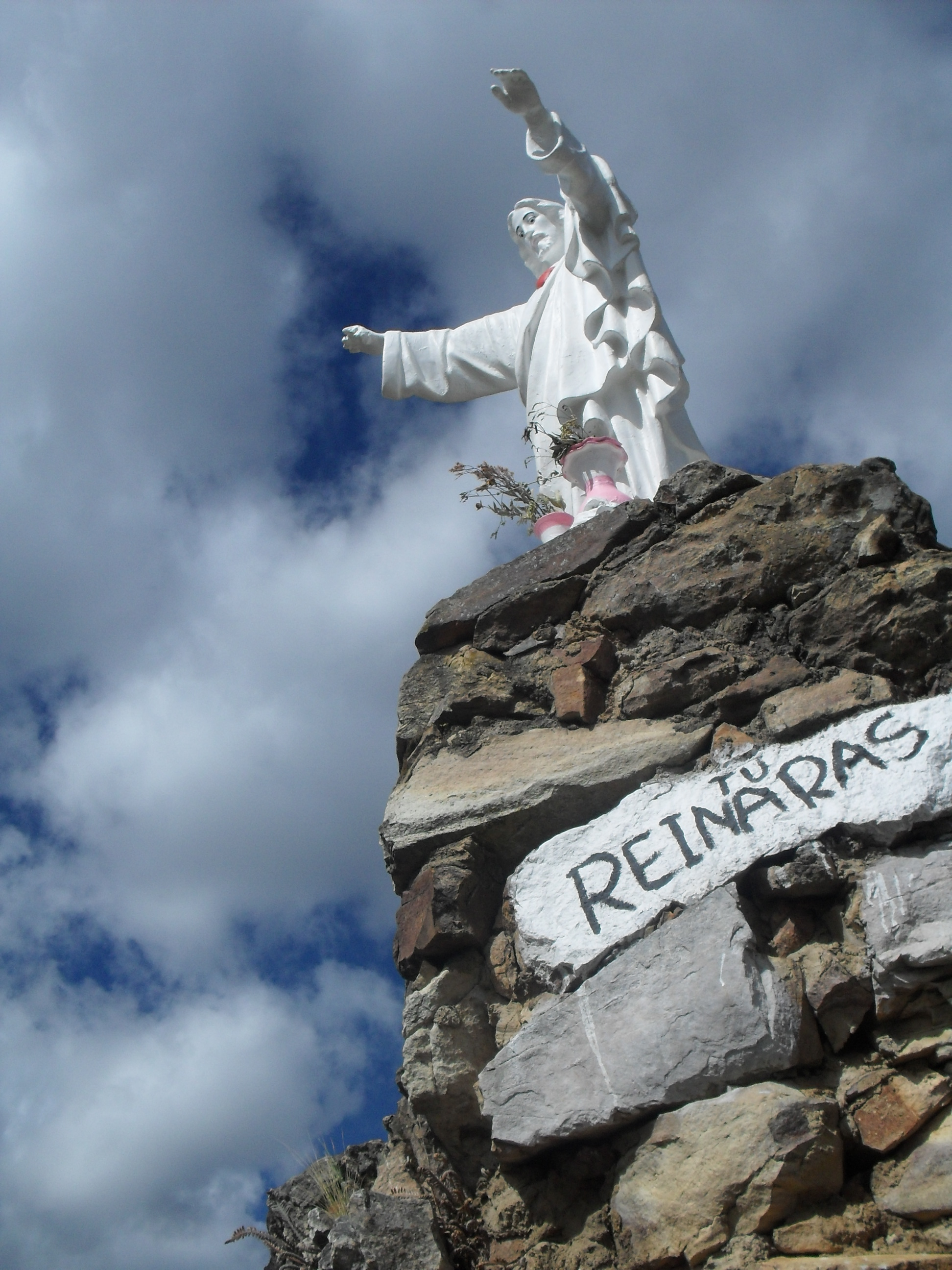
Christ with outstretched arms

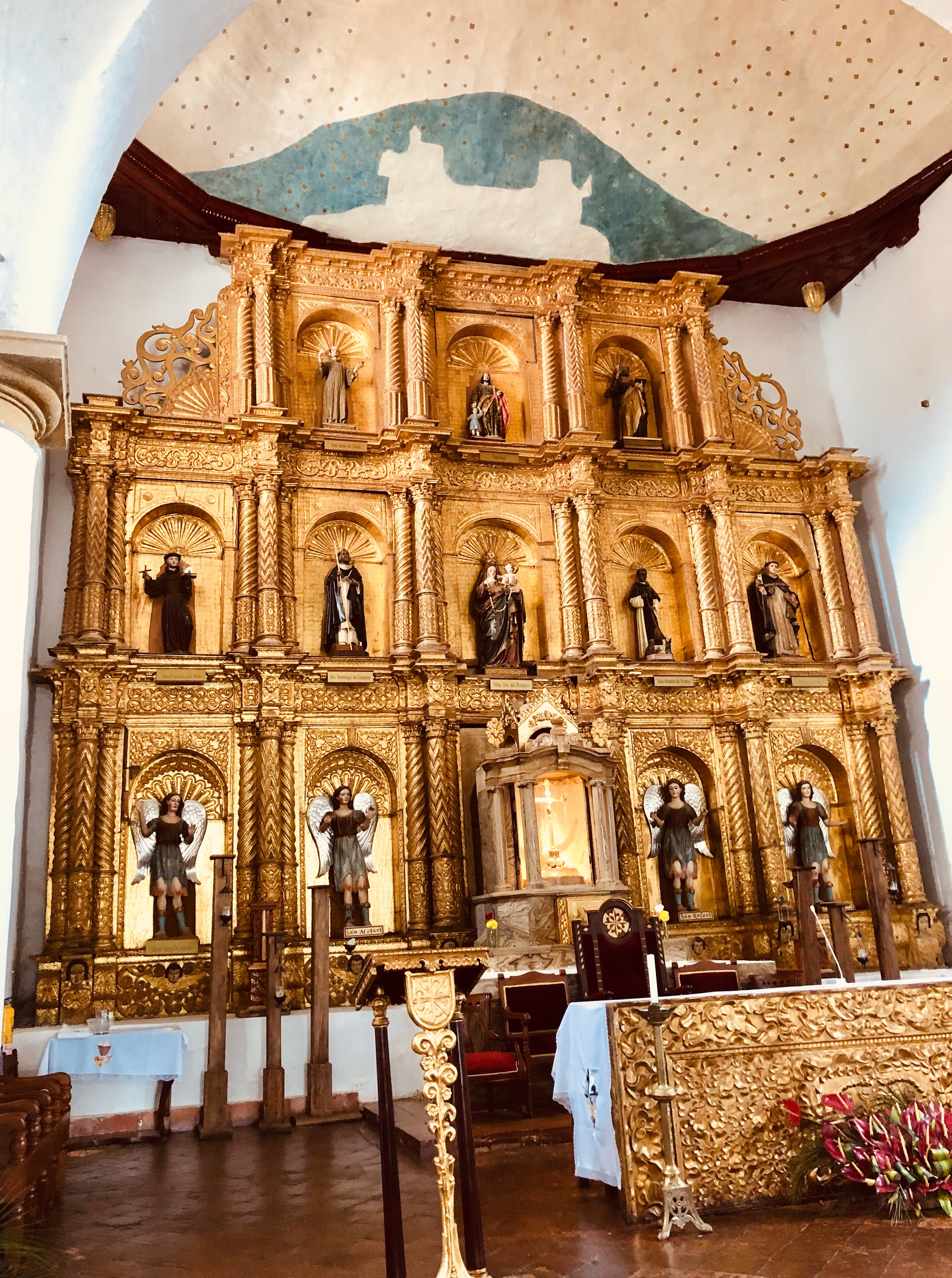
Altarpiece of Church of Nuestra Señora del Rosario

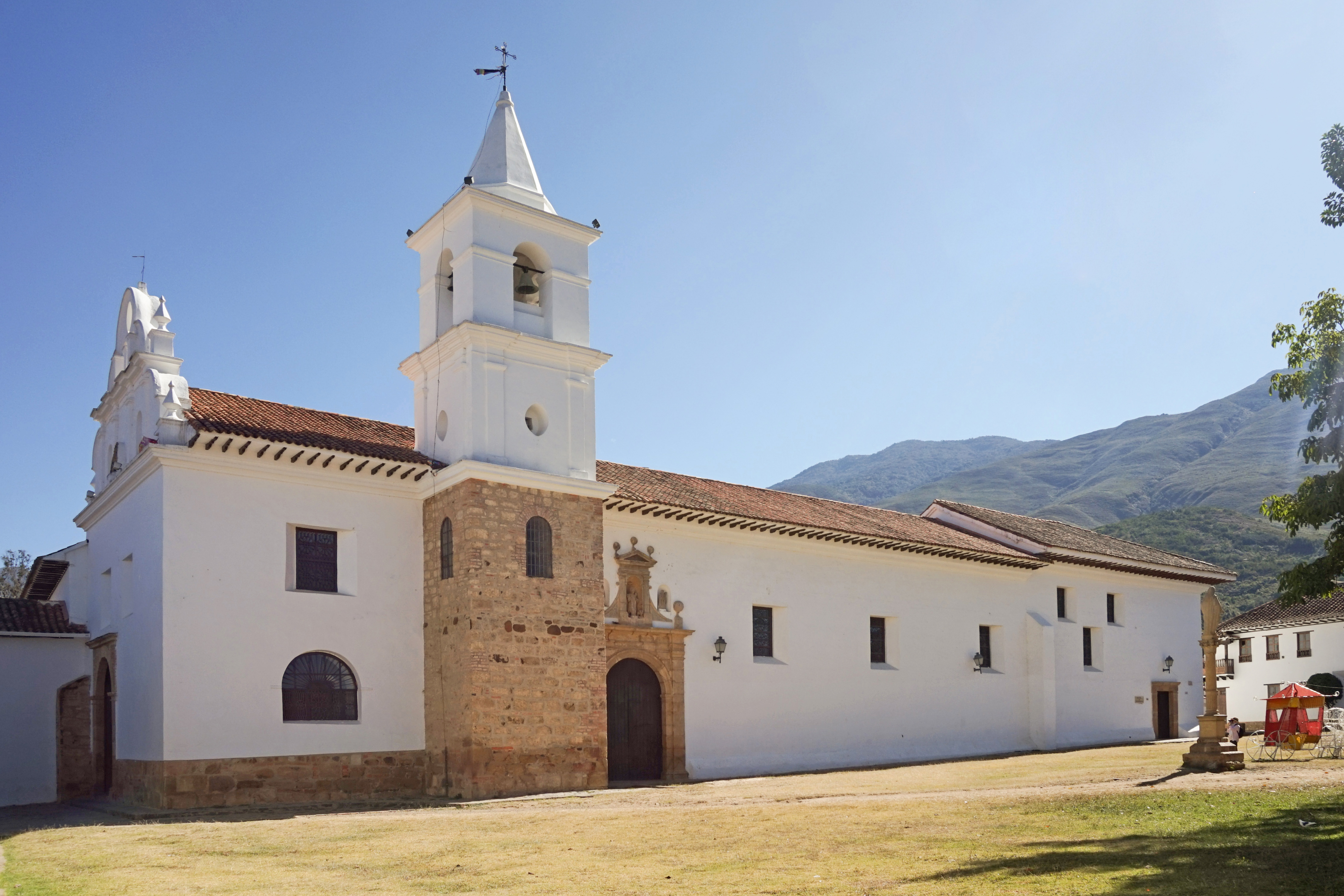
Church del Carmen

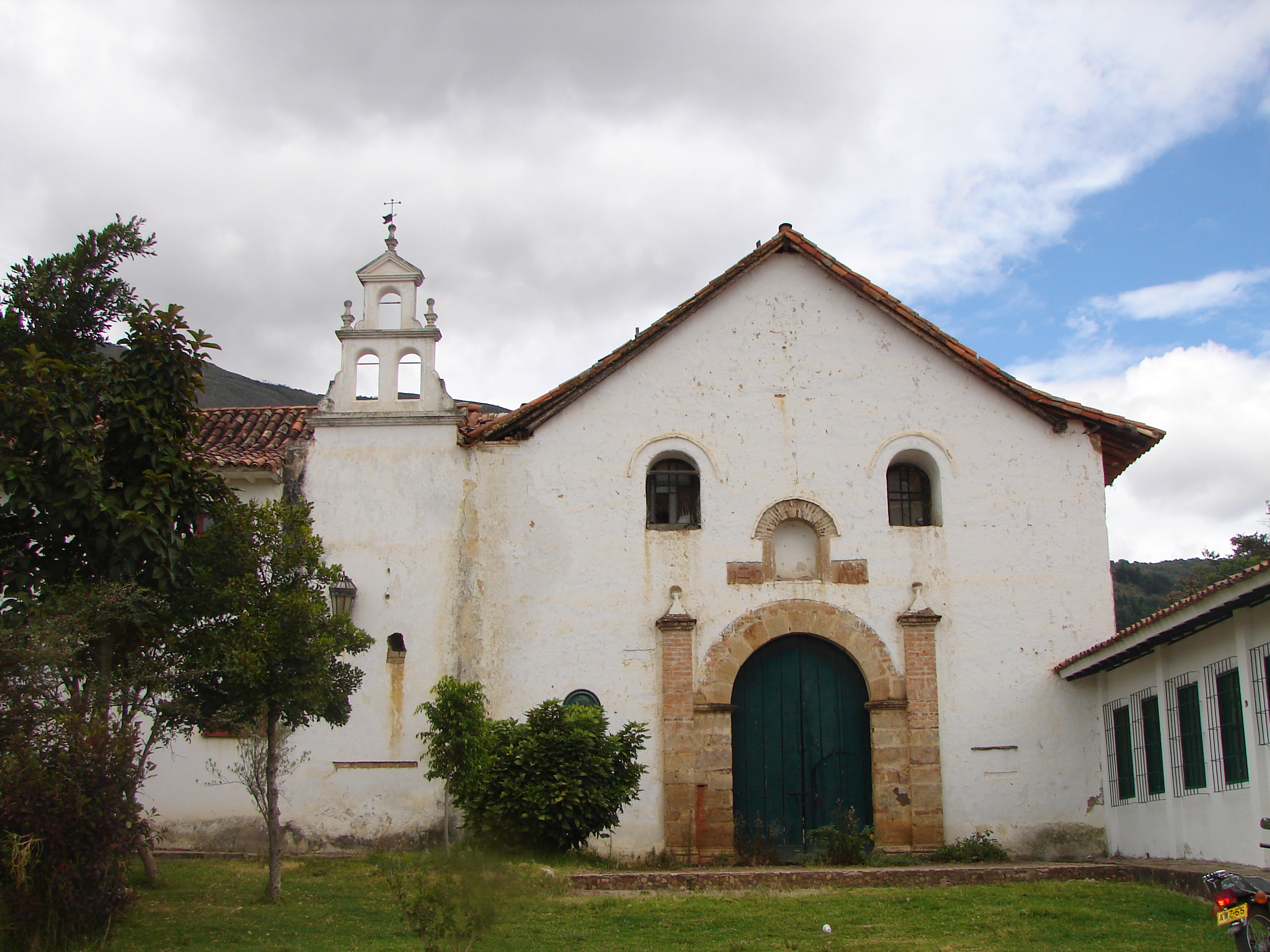
Church of the colonial Hospital of Villa de Leyva

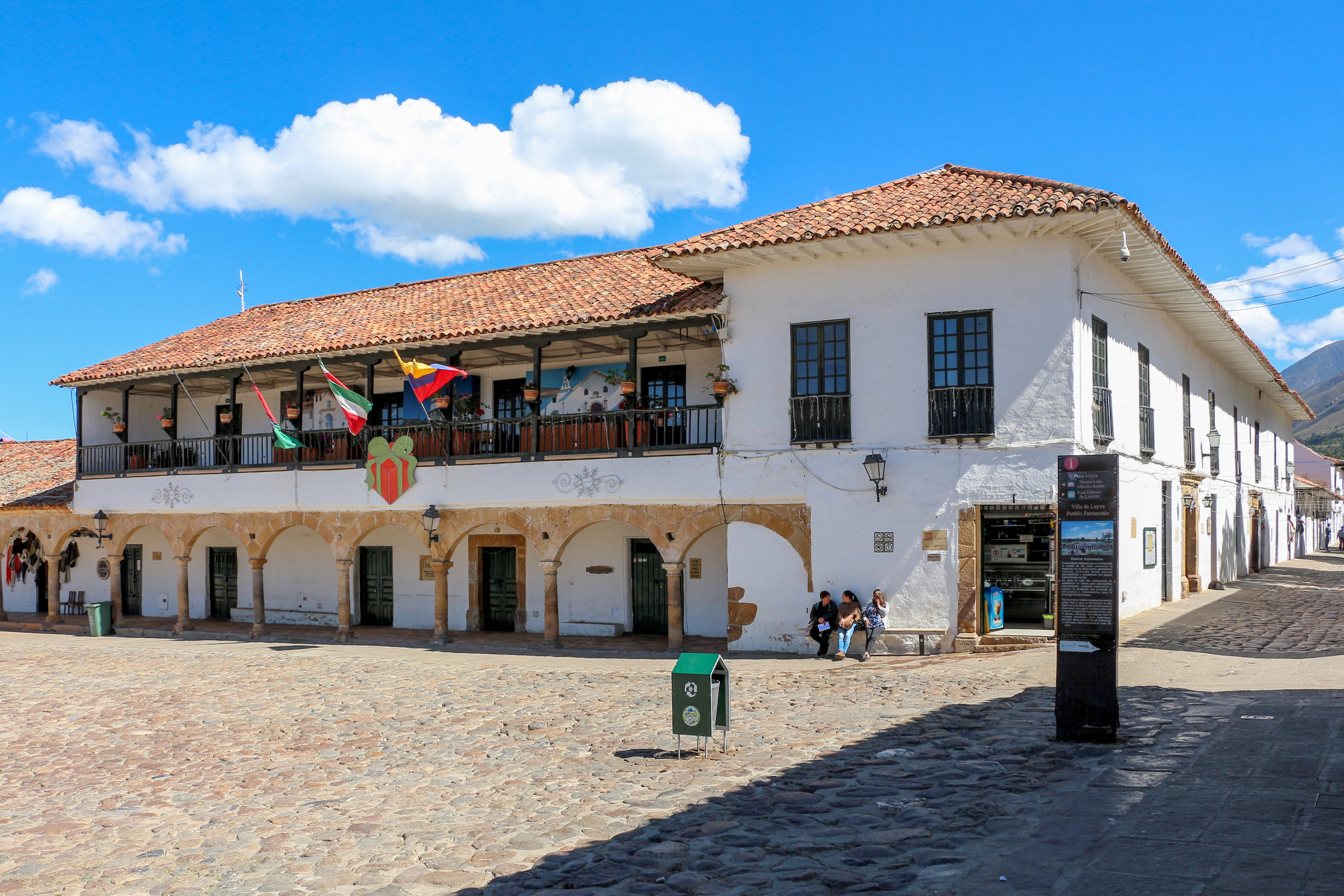
Colonial City Hall

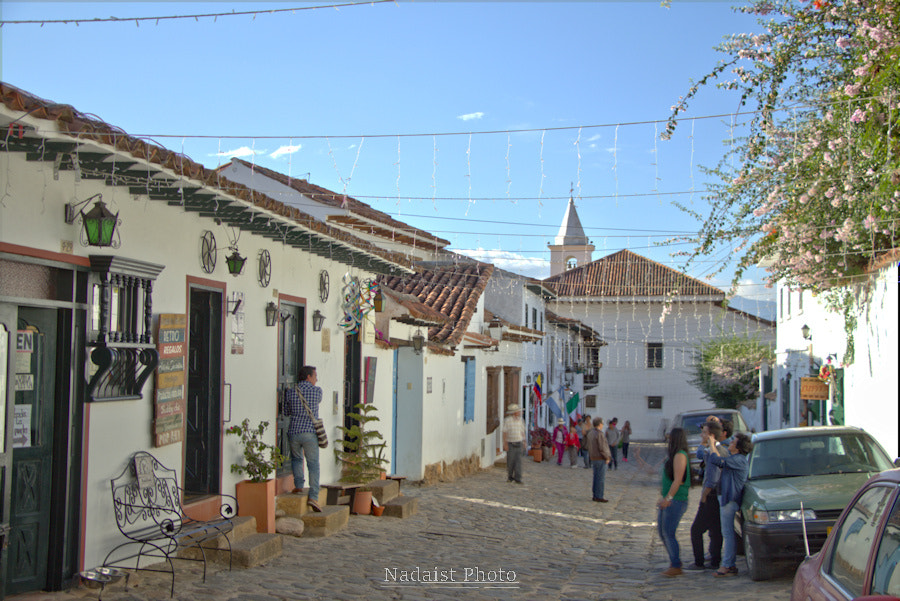

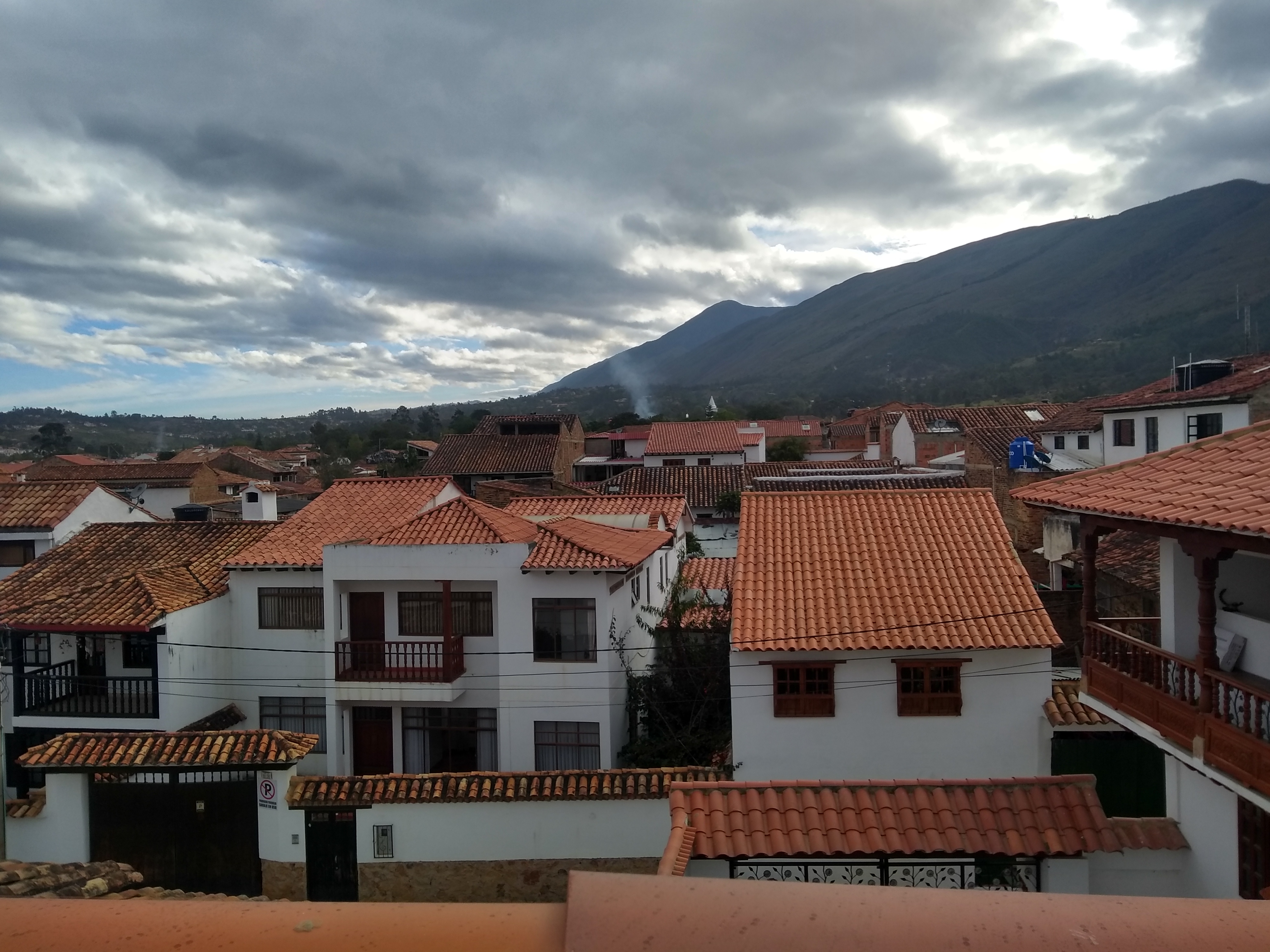

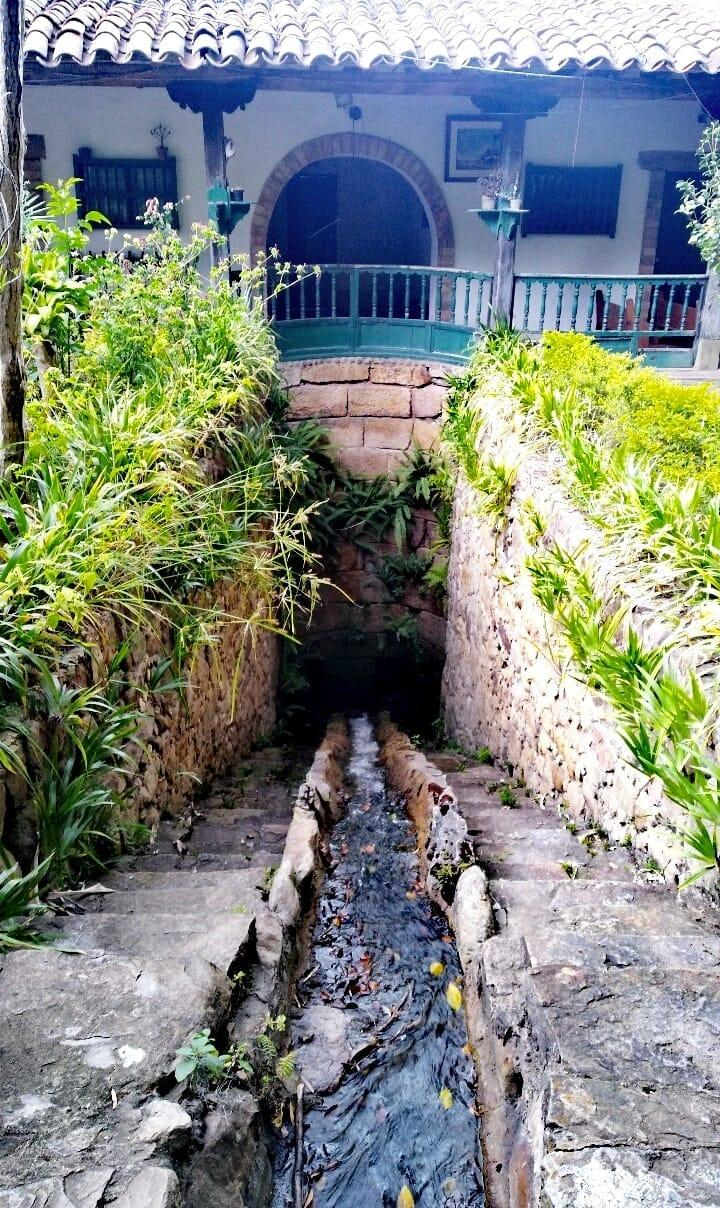
Ancient hacienda and mill

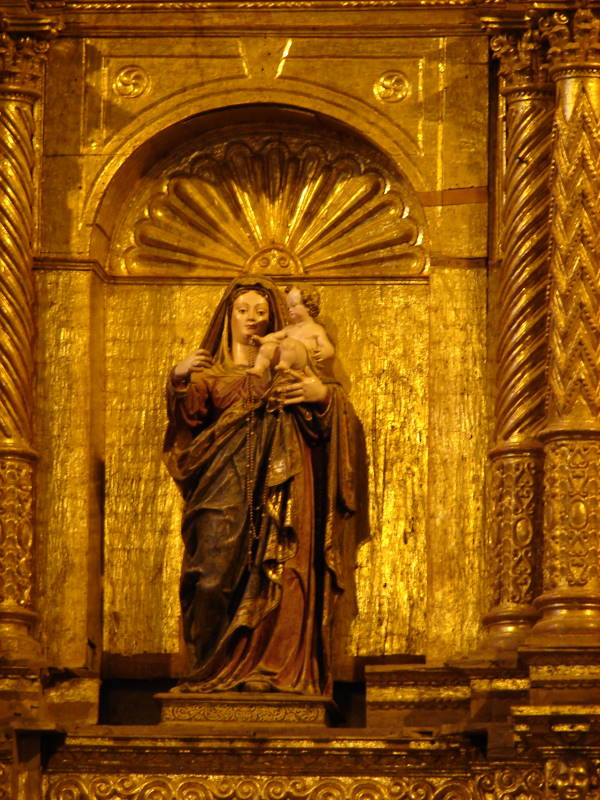

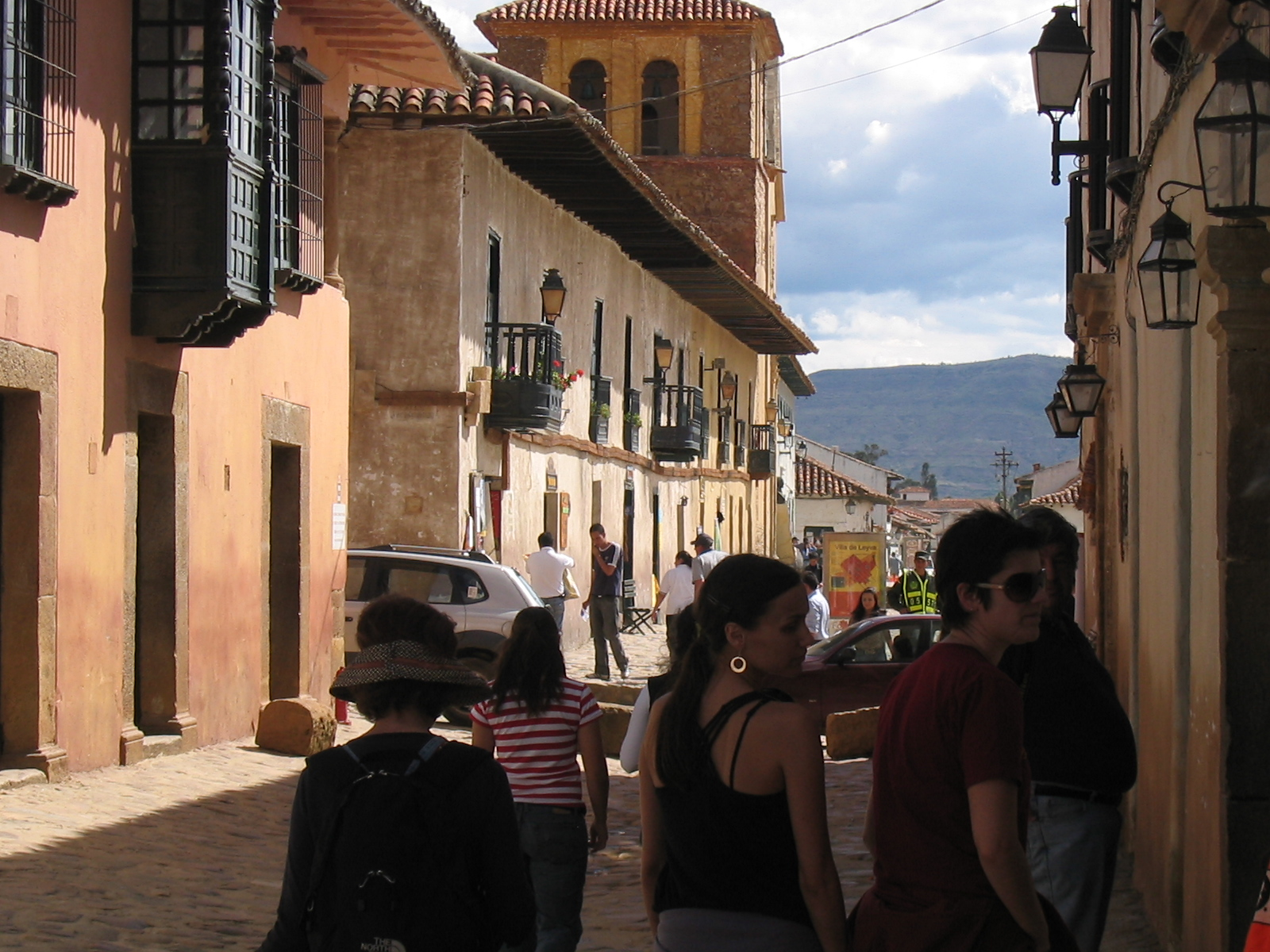
colonial church

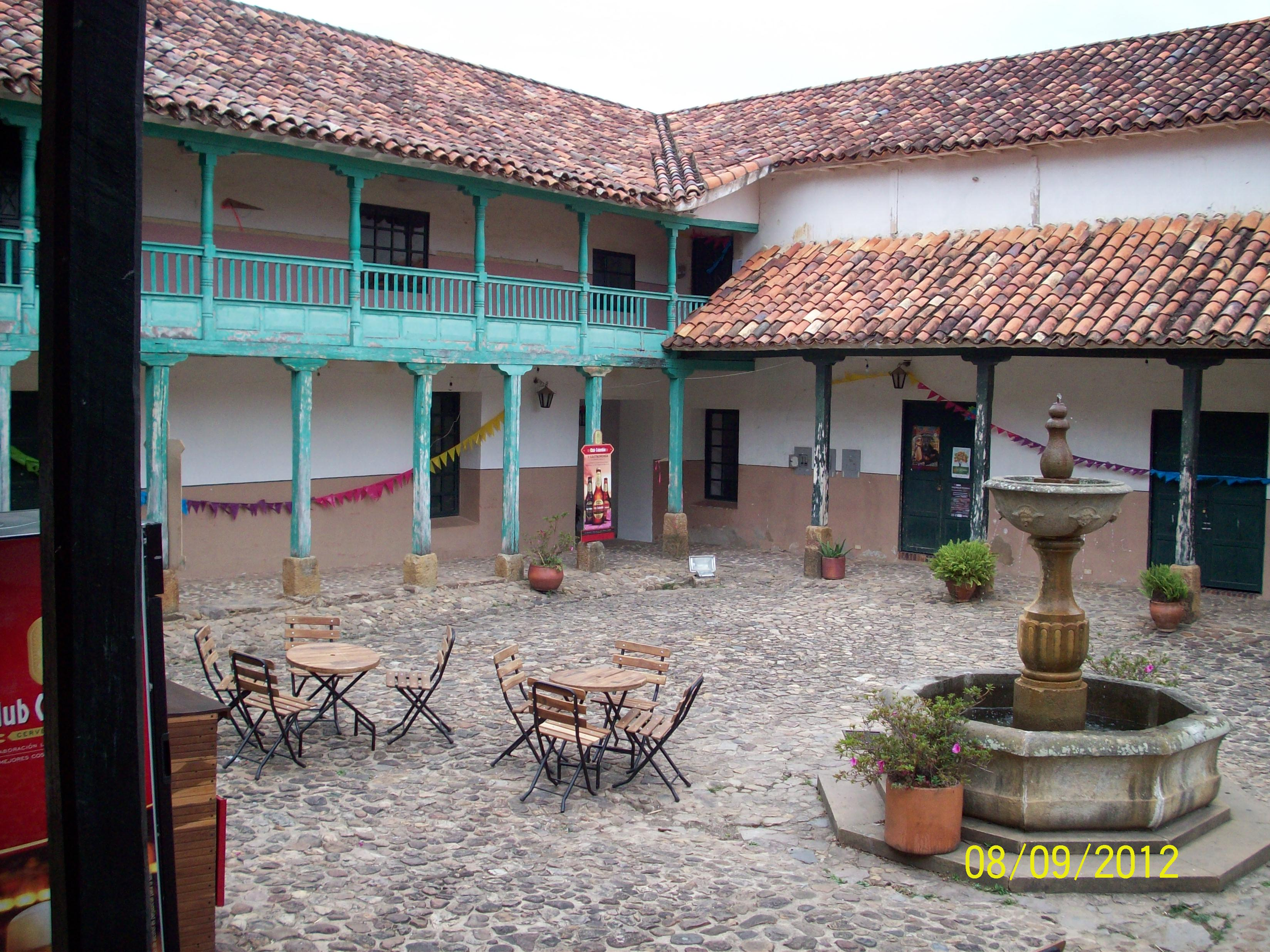
colonial courtyard of a mansion

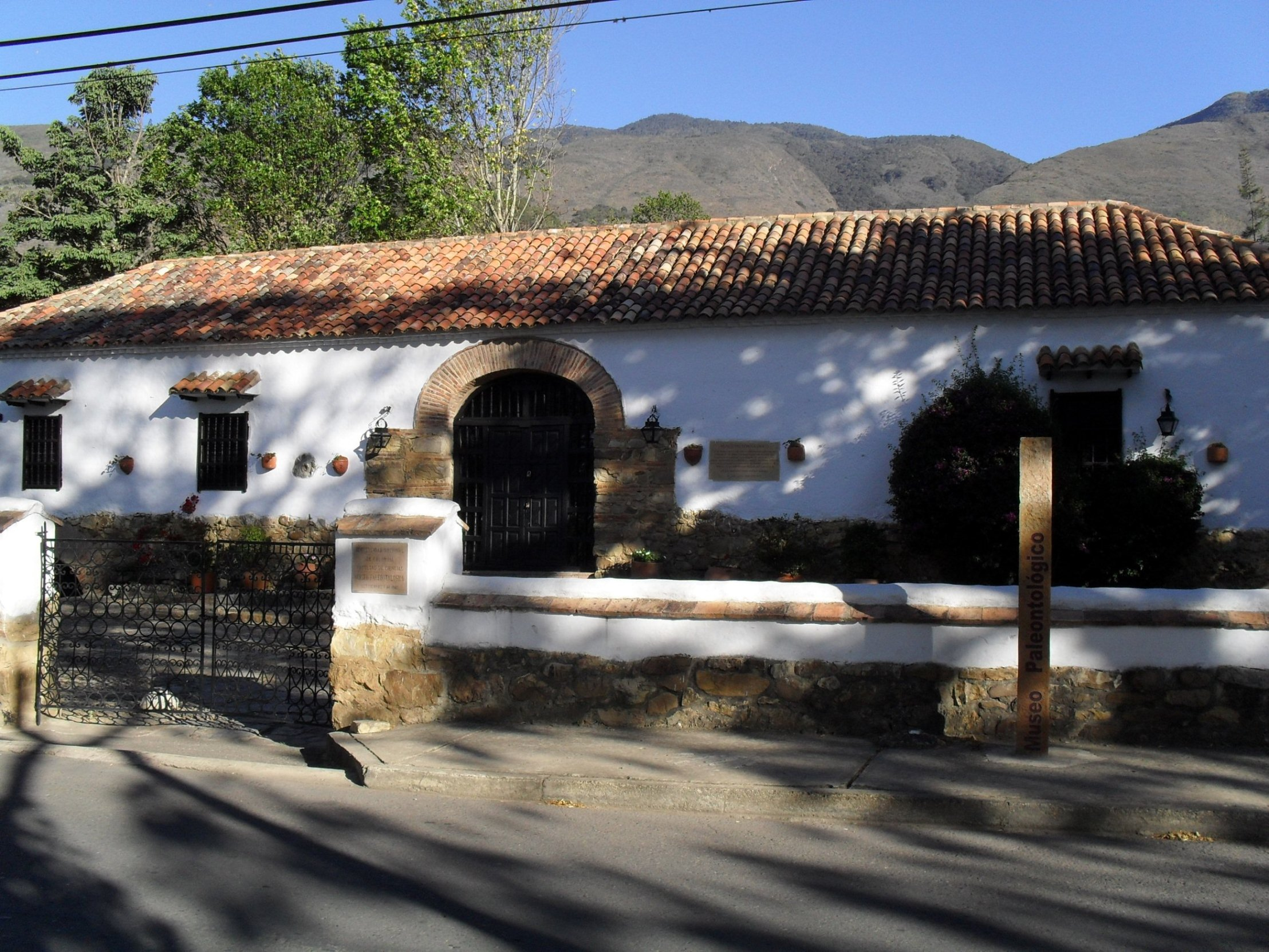
Paleontology museum of Villa de Leyva

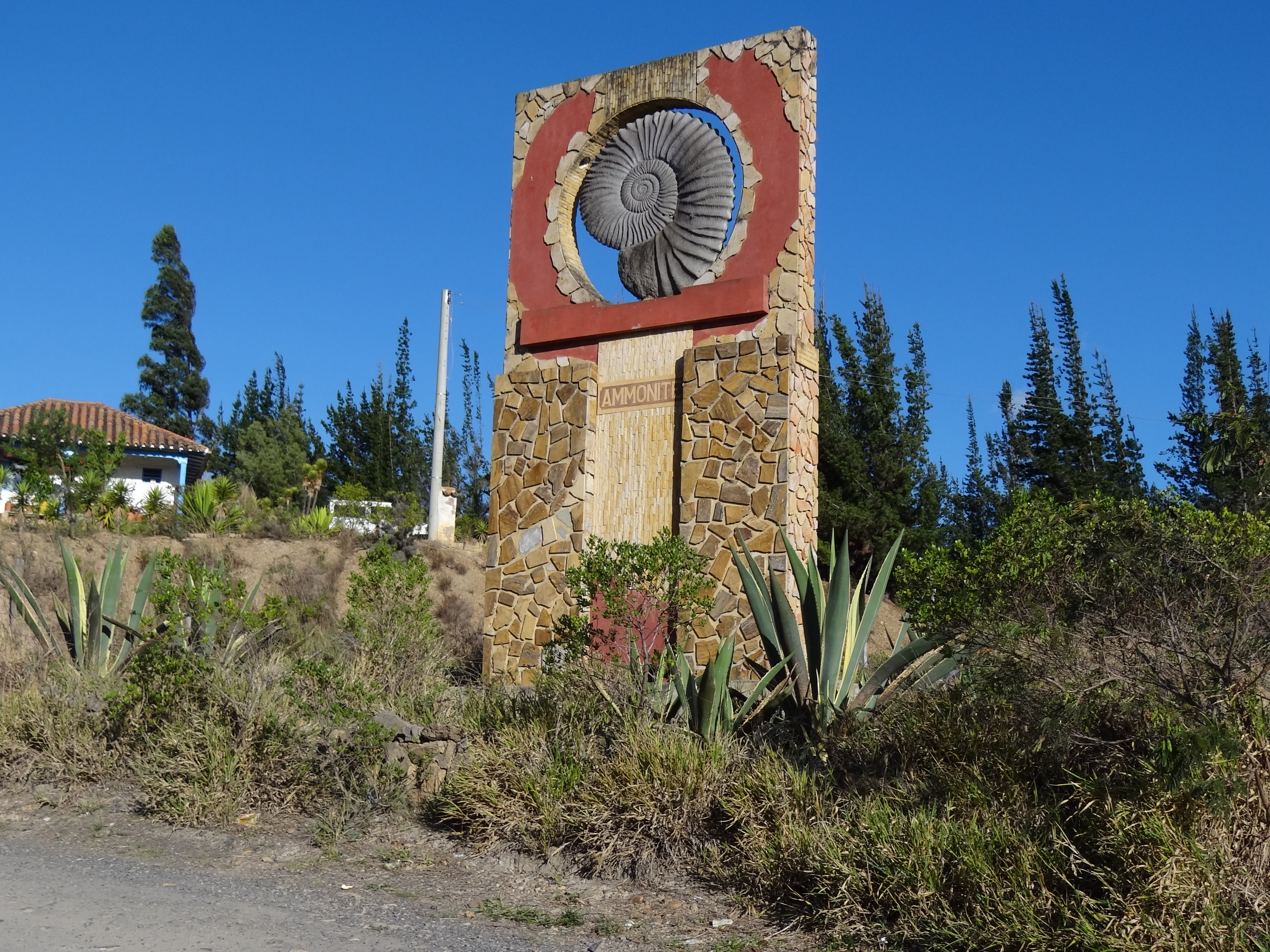
Ammonite monument in Villa de Leyva

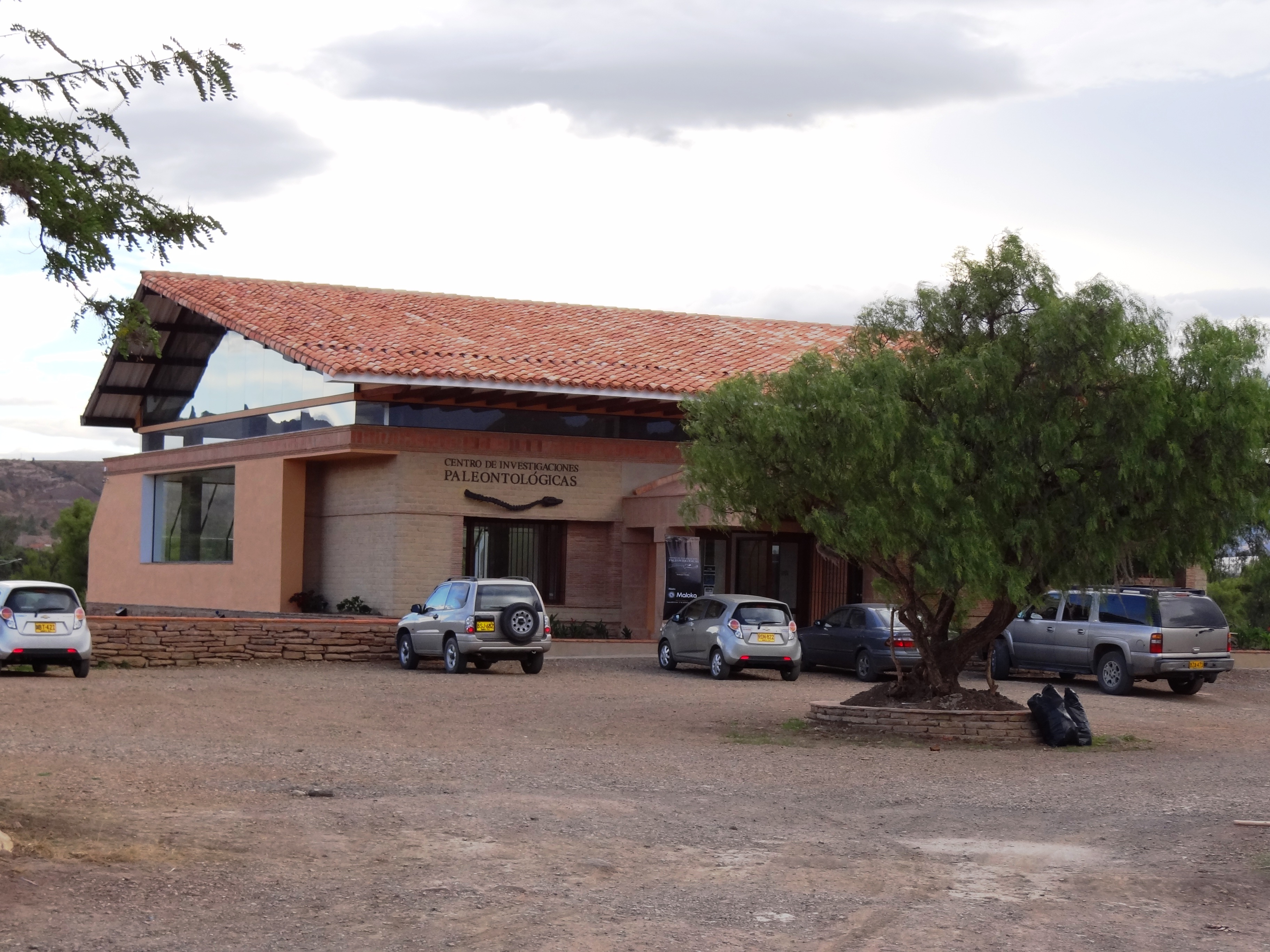
Paleontological museum with El Fósil

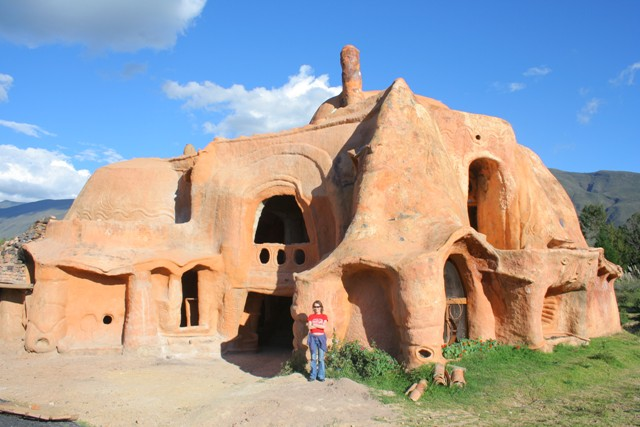
Clay house

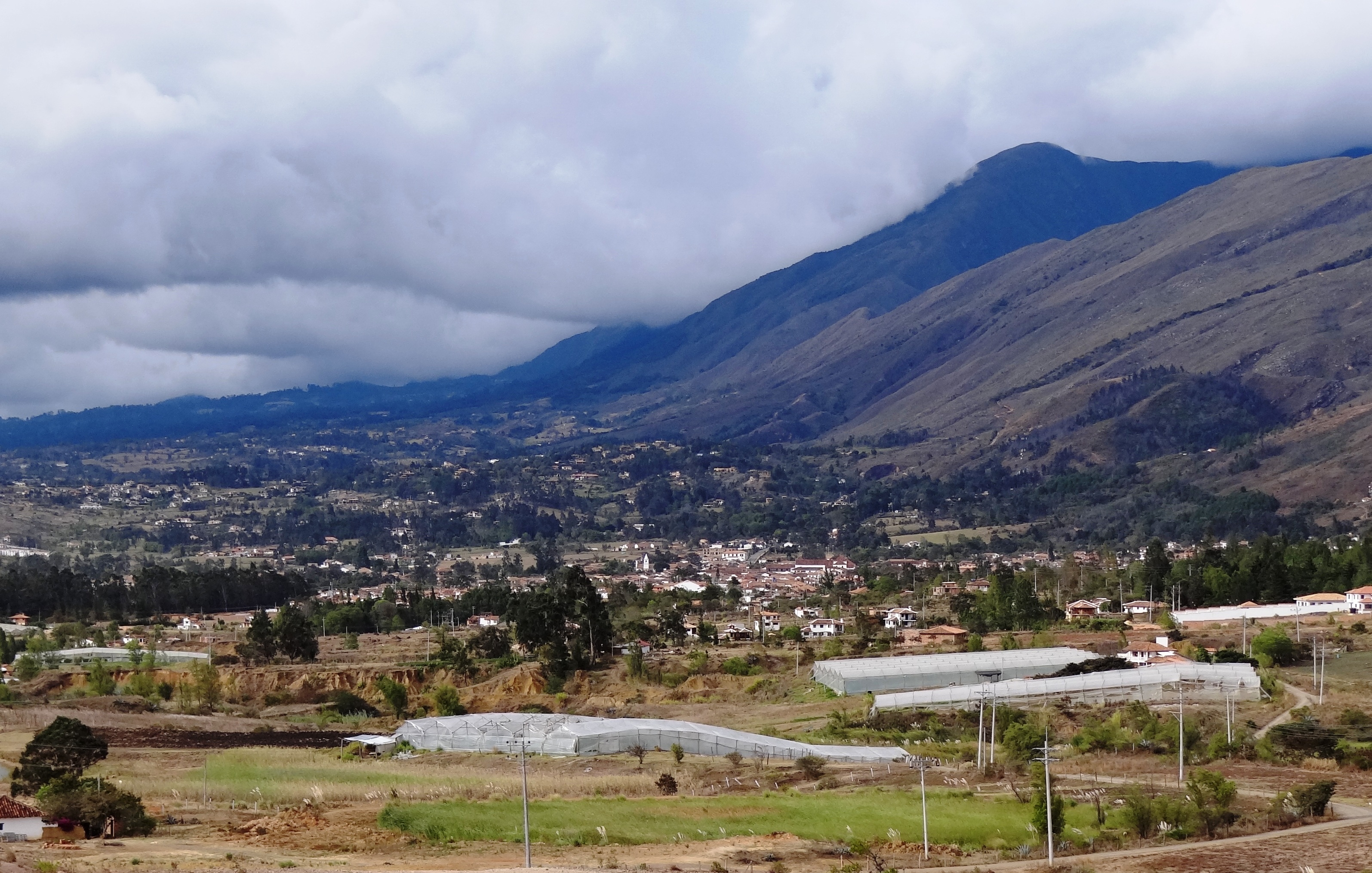
Rural area

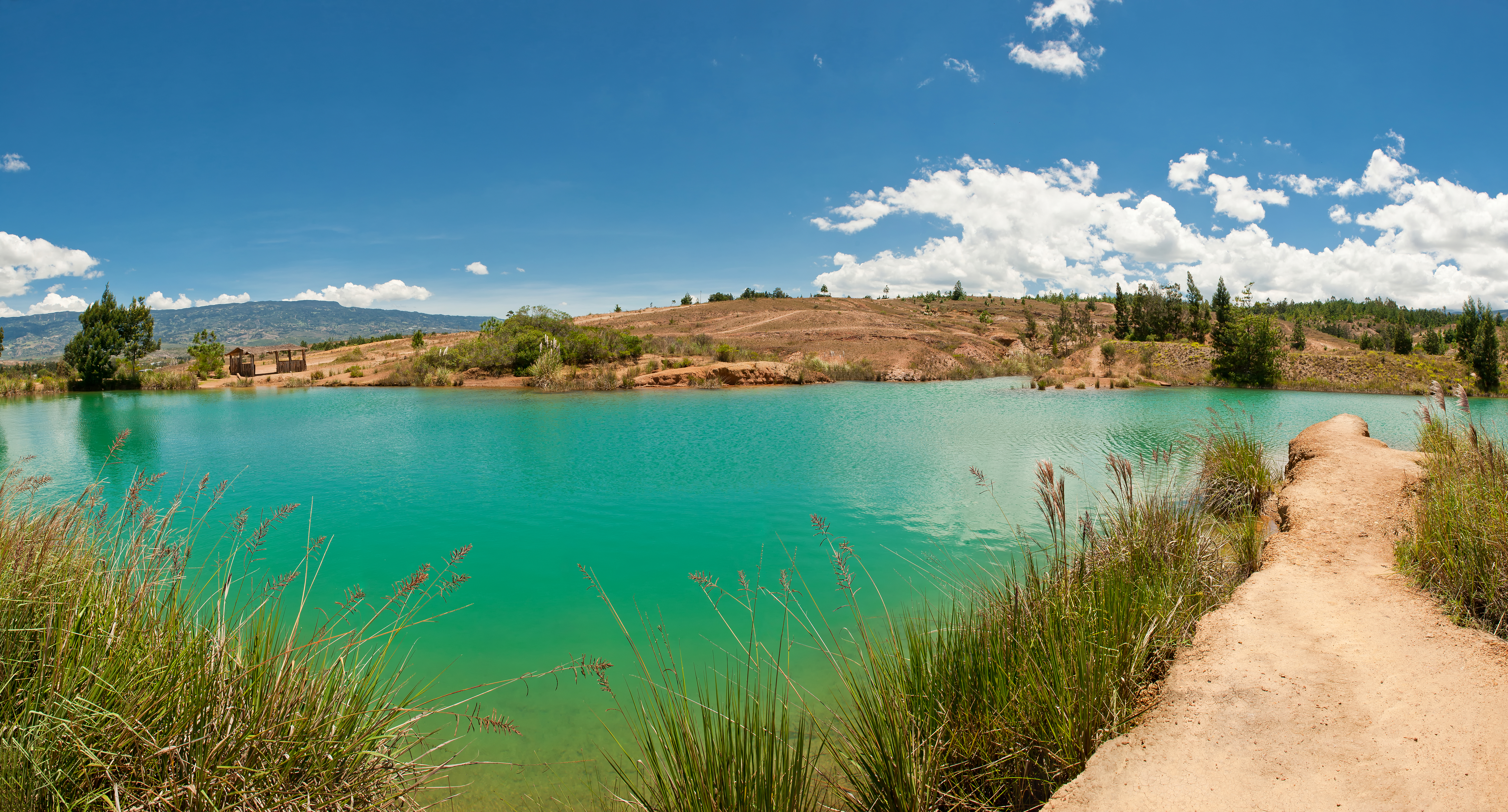
Pozos Azules

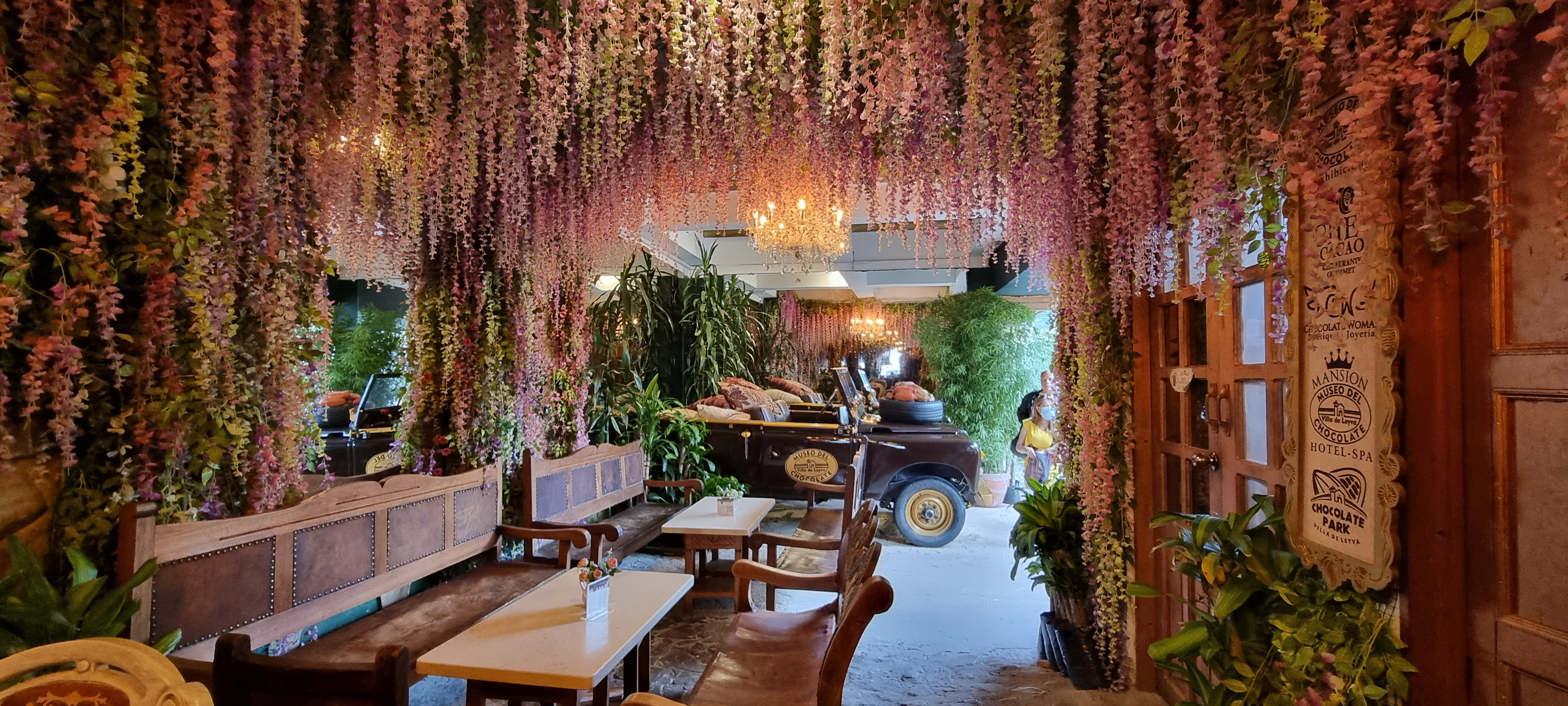
Interior museum

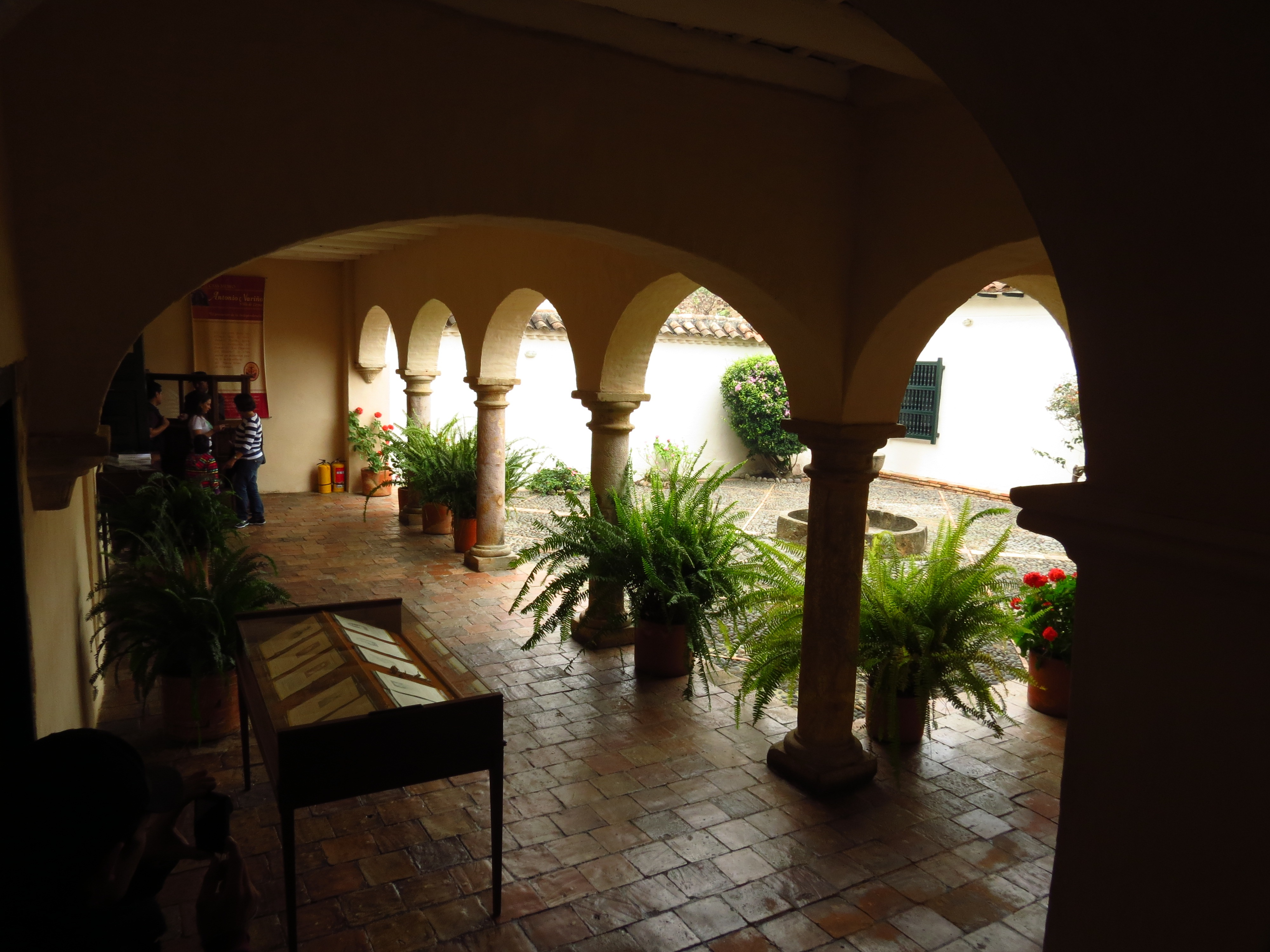
House where Antonio Nariño died

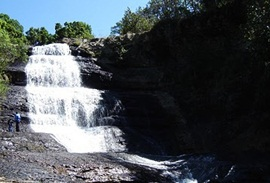
La Periquera waterfall

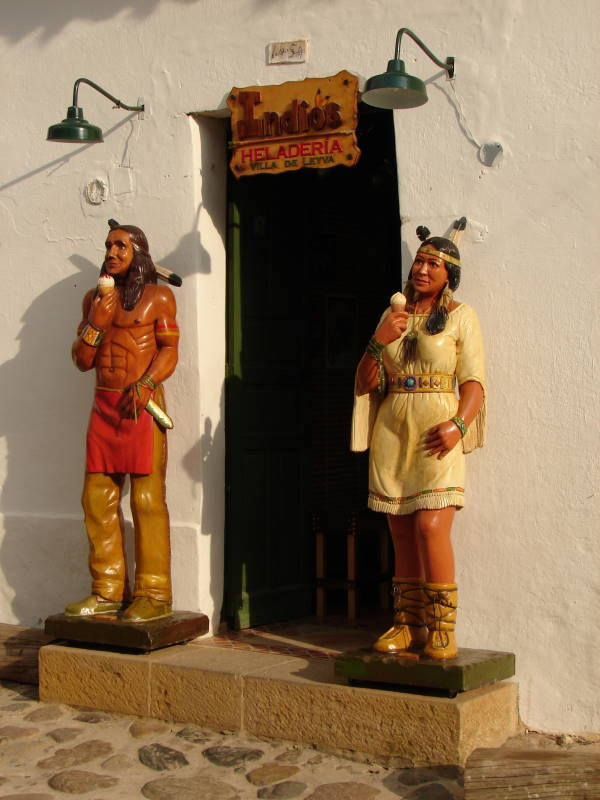
Local ice cream store

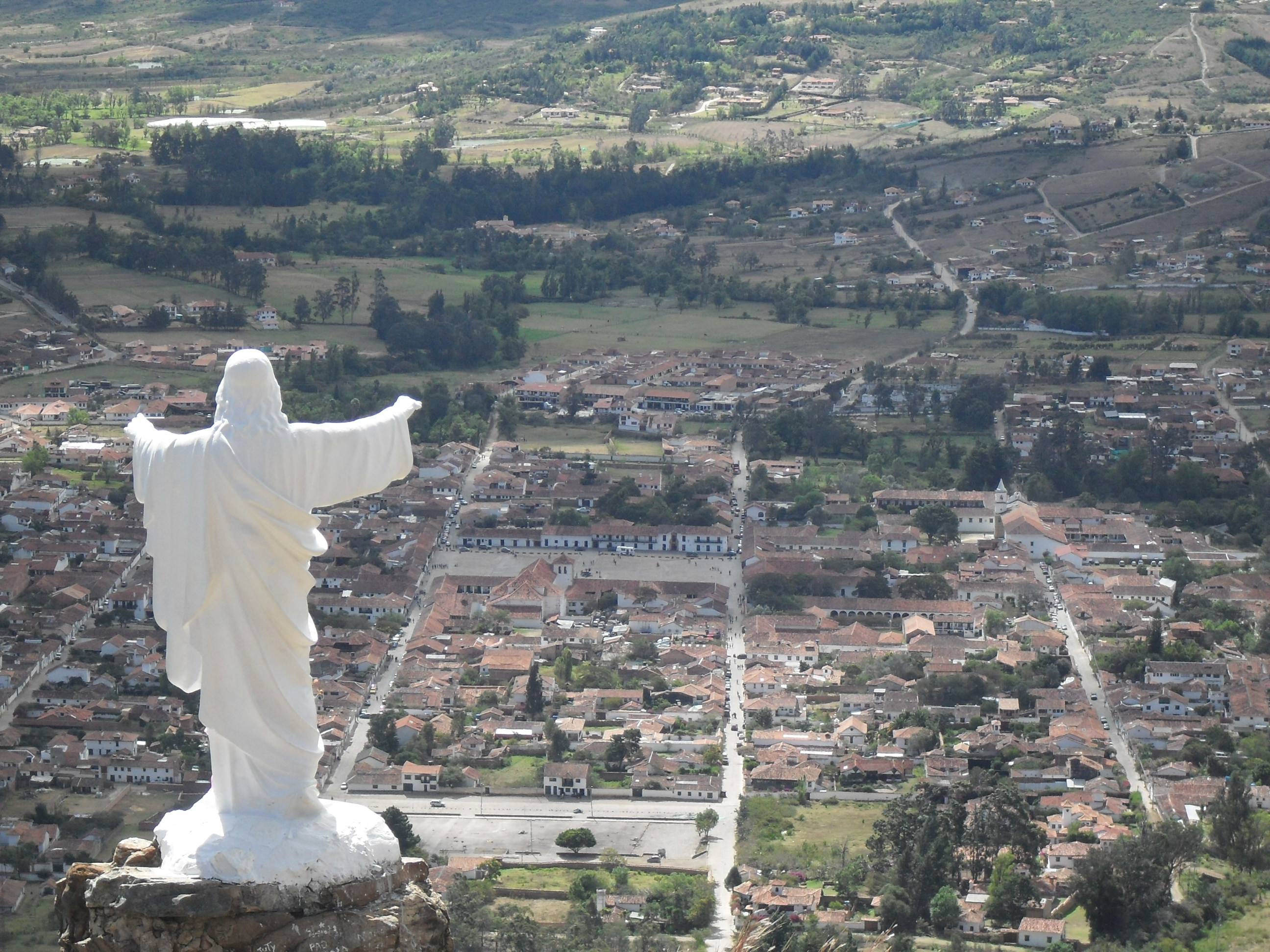
Christ with outstretched arms on the top of the town

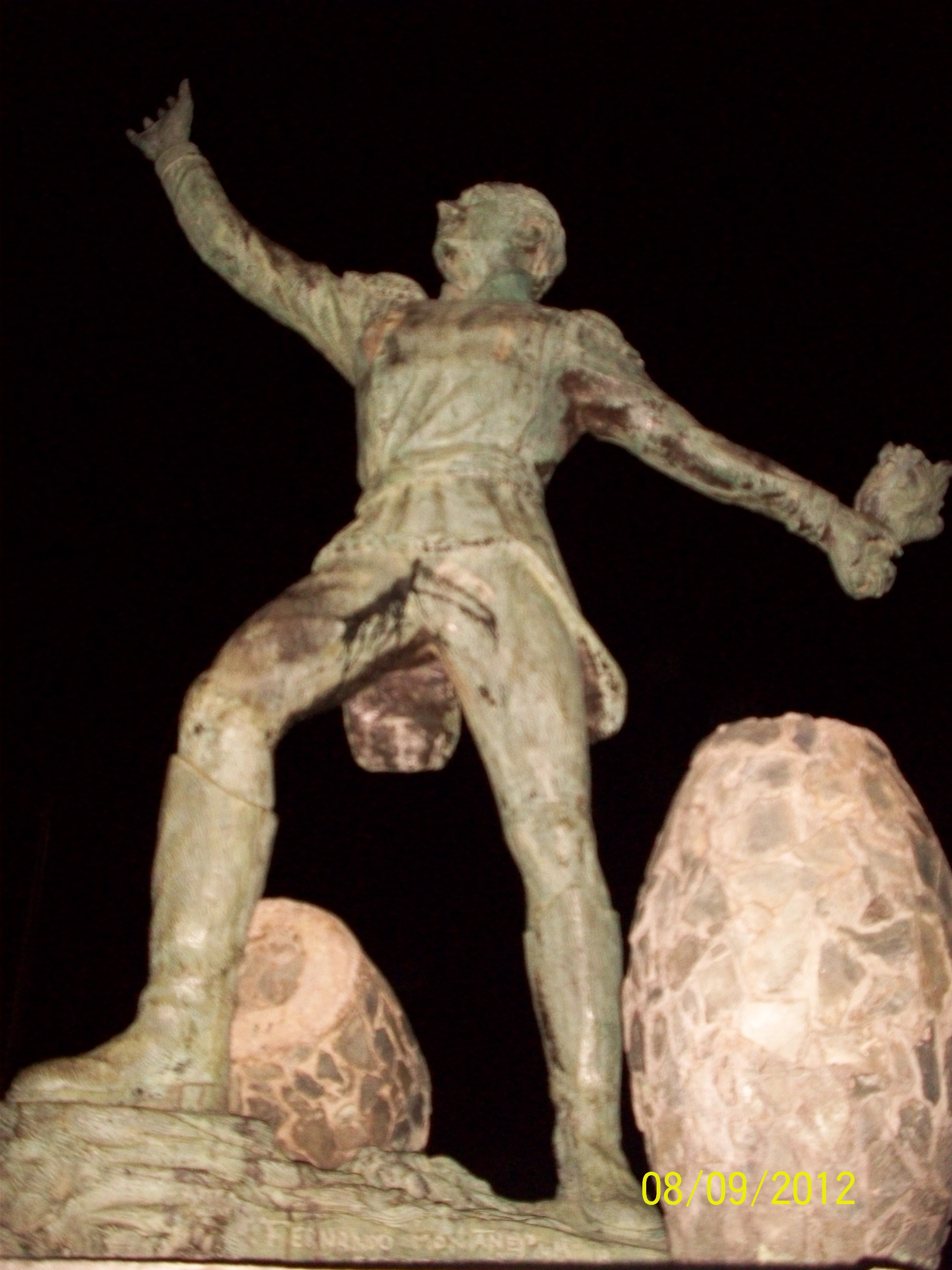
Statue of Antonio Ricaurte
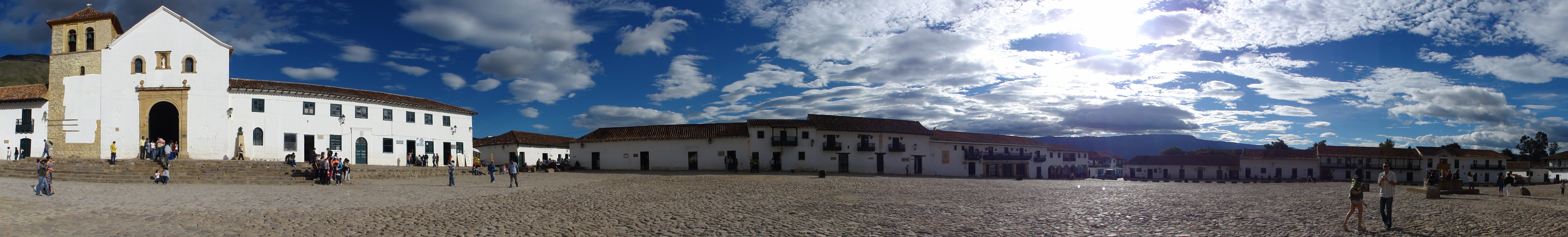
Panoramic view of Villa de Leyva's main square
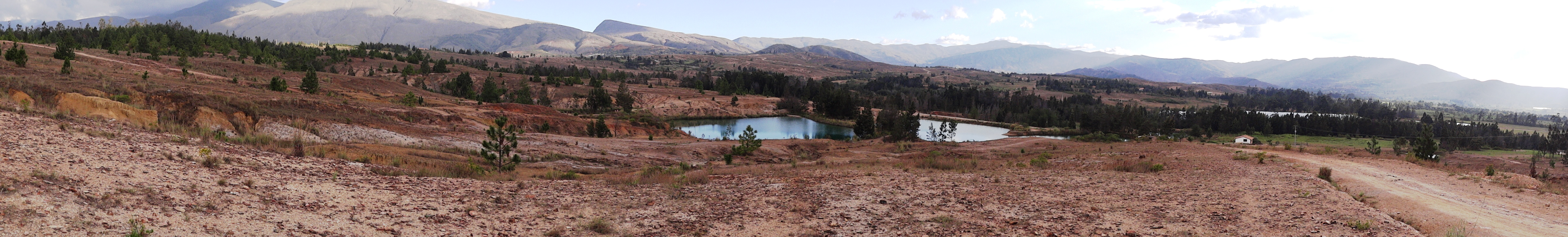
Panoramic view of Villa de Leyva's semi-desert

== In popular culture ==
- Florentino Ariza, the main character of Gabriel García Márquez's novel Love in the Time of Cholera (1985), is sent to Villa de Leyva, but never arrives there.
- Part of the film Cobra Verde (1987) by Werner Herzog was filmed here
- The Spanish-language soap opera El Zorro, la espada y la rosa (2007) has been filmed here

== See also ==
- El Infiernito
