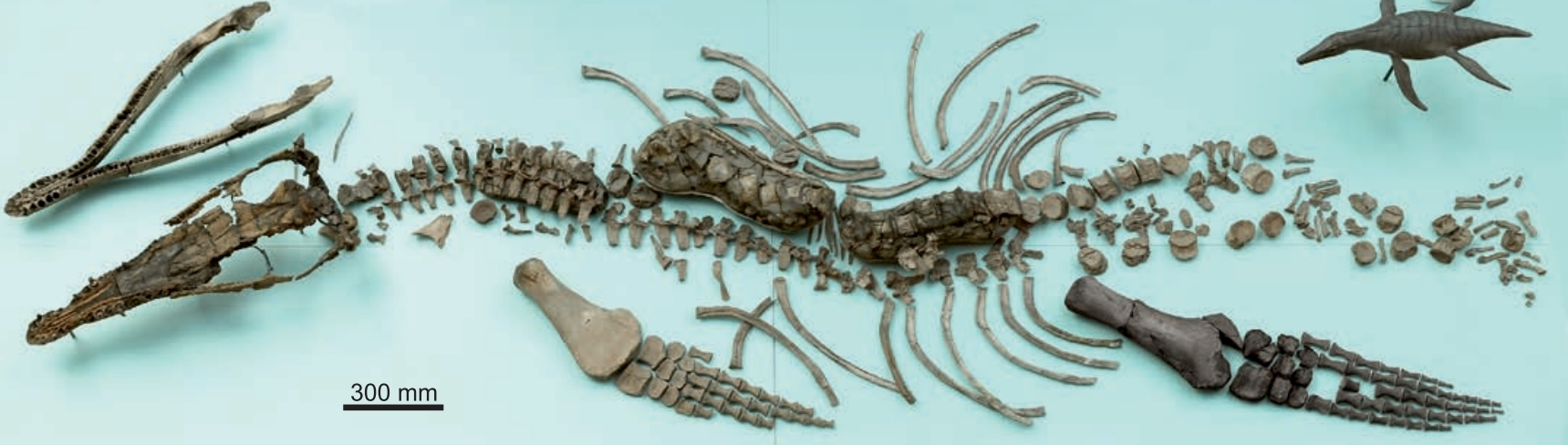
- Holotype specimen, displayed at the Oxford University Museum

Scientific classification
- Kingdom: Animalia
- Phylum: Chordata
- Class: Reptilia
- Superorder: †Sauropterygia
- Order: †Plesiosauria
- Suborder: †Pliosauroidea
- Family: †Pliosauridae
- Clade: †Thalassophonea
- Genus: †Eardasaurus; Ketchum & Benson, 2022

Type species
- †Eardasaurus powelli Ketchum & Benson, 2022

= Eardasaurus =

Eardasaurus Temporal range: Middle Jurassic, ~Callovian

Genus of pliosaurid

Eardasaurus is a genus of thalassophonean pliosaurid from the middle Jurassic Oxford Clay Formation. The animal would have measured over 4.7 m (15 ft) long (the tail was not fully preserved) and possessed a high amount of teeth relative to other pliosaurs. Its teeth show distinct ridges formed by the tooth enamel, some of which are very pronounced and similar to carinae, giving the teeth a cutting edge.

== History and naming ==
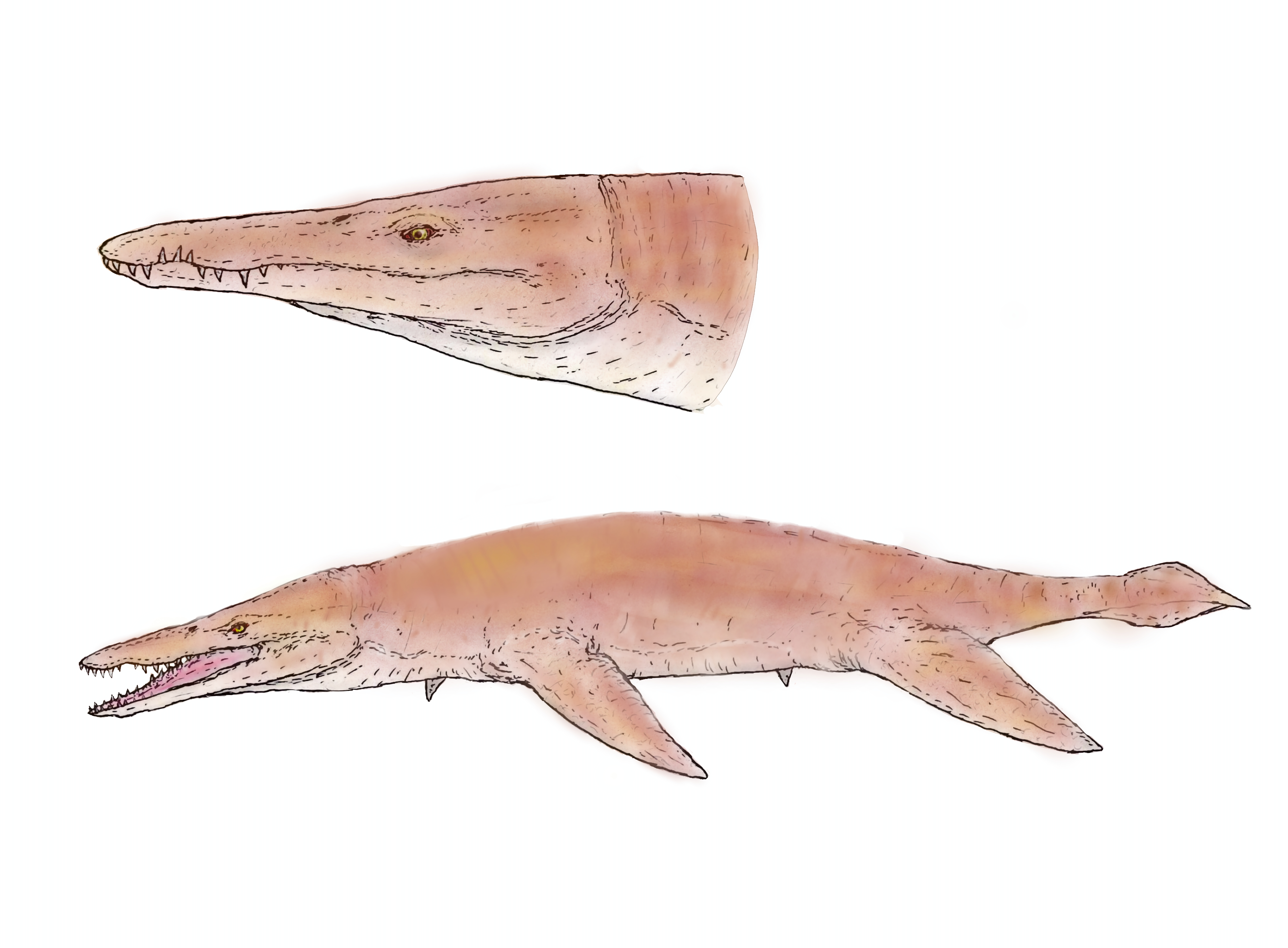
Life restoration

The remains of Eardasaurus were discovered by H. Philip Powell in the Oxford Clay Formation near Yarnton in 1994. The only known fossil and holotype, specimen OUMNH PAL-J.2247 (previously listed as OUMNH J.02247), was unearthed from the Peterborough Member of the formation, which indicates that it lived during the Callovian stage of the Jurassic. The specimen is fairly complete and partially articulated, preserving both the cranium and mandible, large parts of the vertebral column as well as ribs and gastralia as well as the remains of the left fore- and hindlimbs.

The genus name is composed of the Old English word "eard", which means "home" or "dwelling", and "saurus", Greek for lizard. The name of the nearby town of Yarnton is likewise derived from "eard". The specific name on the other hand honors H. Philip Powell for discovering the fossil.

== Description ==
The holotype specimen measures approximately 4.7 m (15 ft) long, however as the tail is only incompletely preserved the animal would have been larger in life.

=== Skull ===
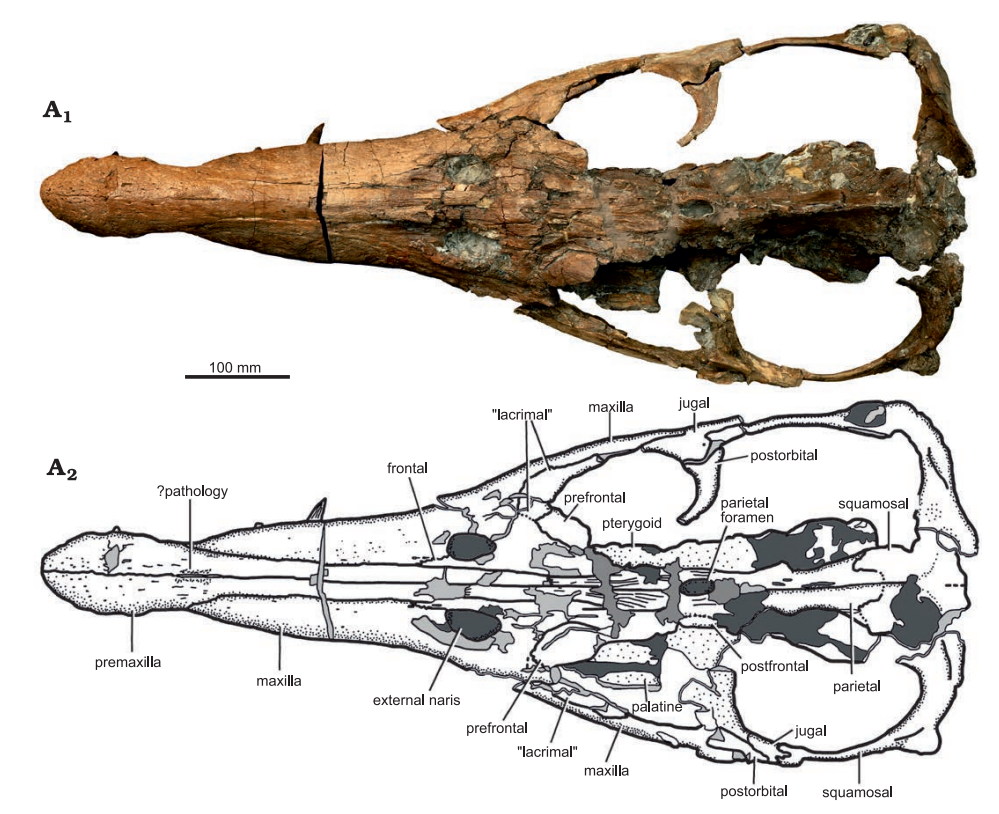
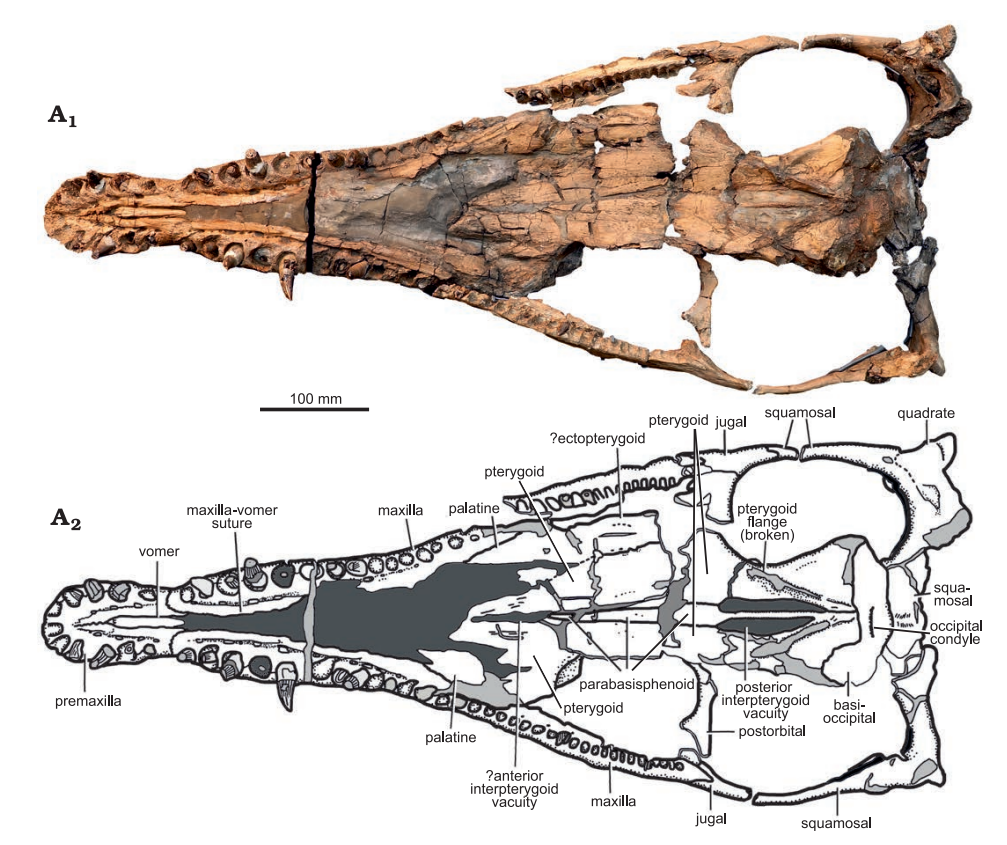
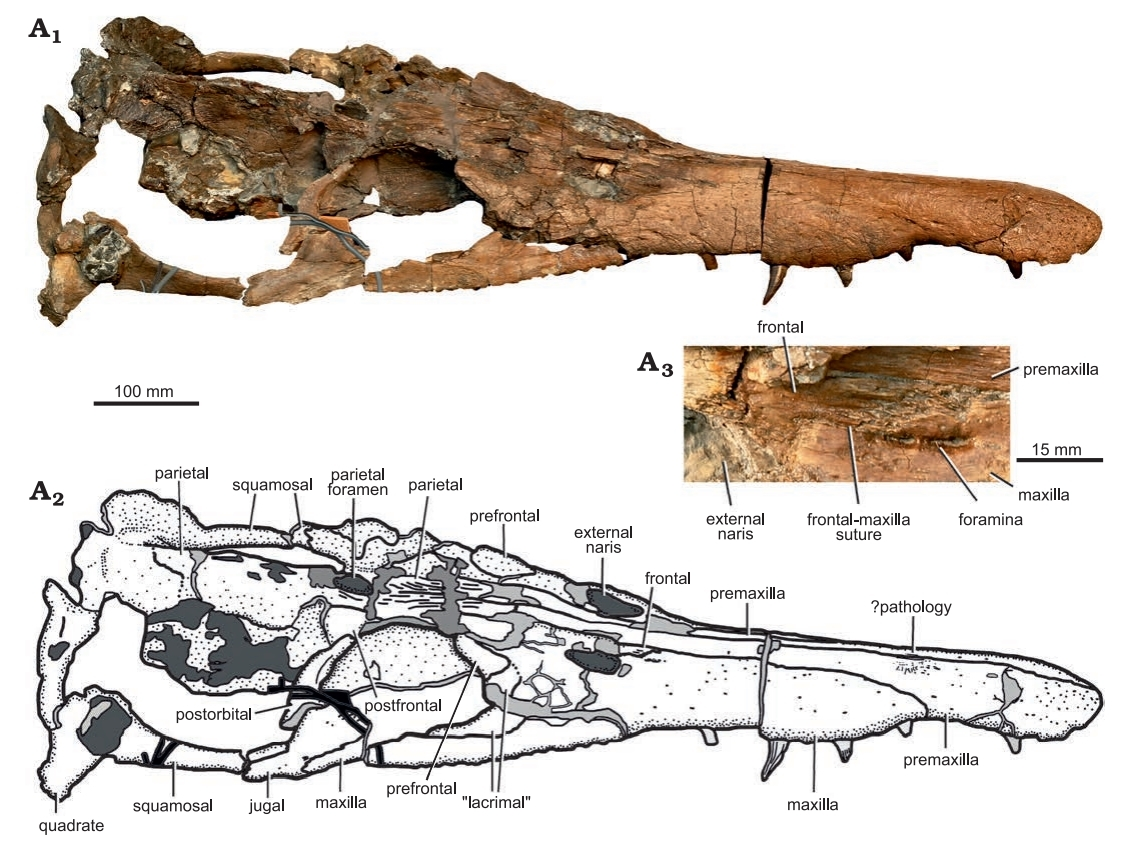
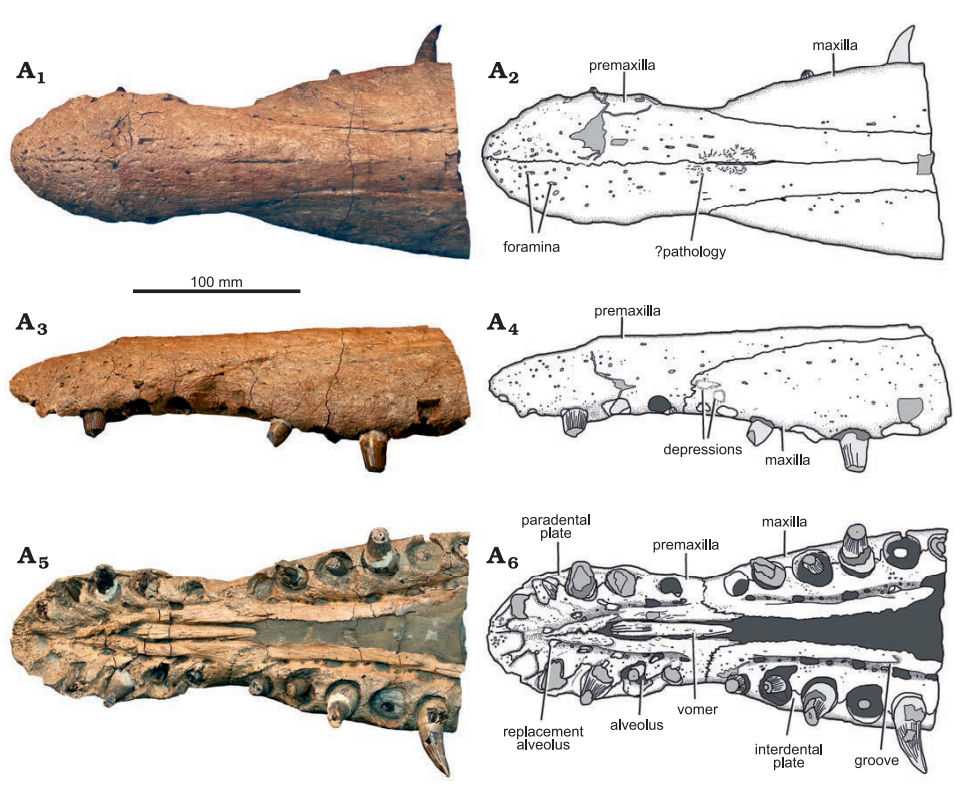
Holotype skull and snout tip in multiple views with respective schematic drawings

Eardasaurus was a longirostrine animal with a roughly triangular skull in dorsal view. The skull measures 890 mm (35 in) long, with 54% of the length composed of the section in front of the eyes. Among the Oxford Clay pliosaurs this ratio is closest to Liopleurodon with a preorbital skull length that makes up 55% of the total length. While the rostrum itself is well preserved, the back of the skull is much more fragmented, rendering it difficult to identify the bone sutures of the region. The anterior-most tip of the rostrum is made up of the paired premaxilla, which bear a series of foramina along their surface. The premaxillae contain five and six teeth respectively, in line with the other pliosaurids it shared its habitat with. The teeth themselves are irregular (anisodont), with the largest being the penultimate alveolus. The smallest on the other hand are the first and last teeth, which show a notable size decrease compared to the other teeth around them. Still, the last tooth in the premaxilla is not as much reduced as observed in other pliosaurs, which may show a size decrease of over 50%. All teeth of the premaxilla are closely spaced except for the area where the premaxilla contacts and interlocks with the maxilla. Here a toothless area (diastema) is present. Such a diastema is also present in Liopleurodon, but absent in most other middle Jurassic pliosaurs. More widespread is the presence of a constriction in the same area. The dorsal contact between the premaxillae is almost straight but interrupted by a slit-like opening surrounded by rugose texturing. While such an opening is present in a more pronounced fashion in rhomaleosaurids, in the case of Eardasaurus it is more than likely a pathology. The premaxillae stretch over the skull deep between the maxillae, only ending at approximately the same level as the anterior edge of the orbits, where they meet the parietal bones.

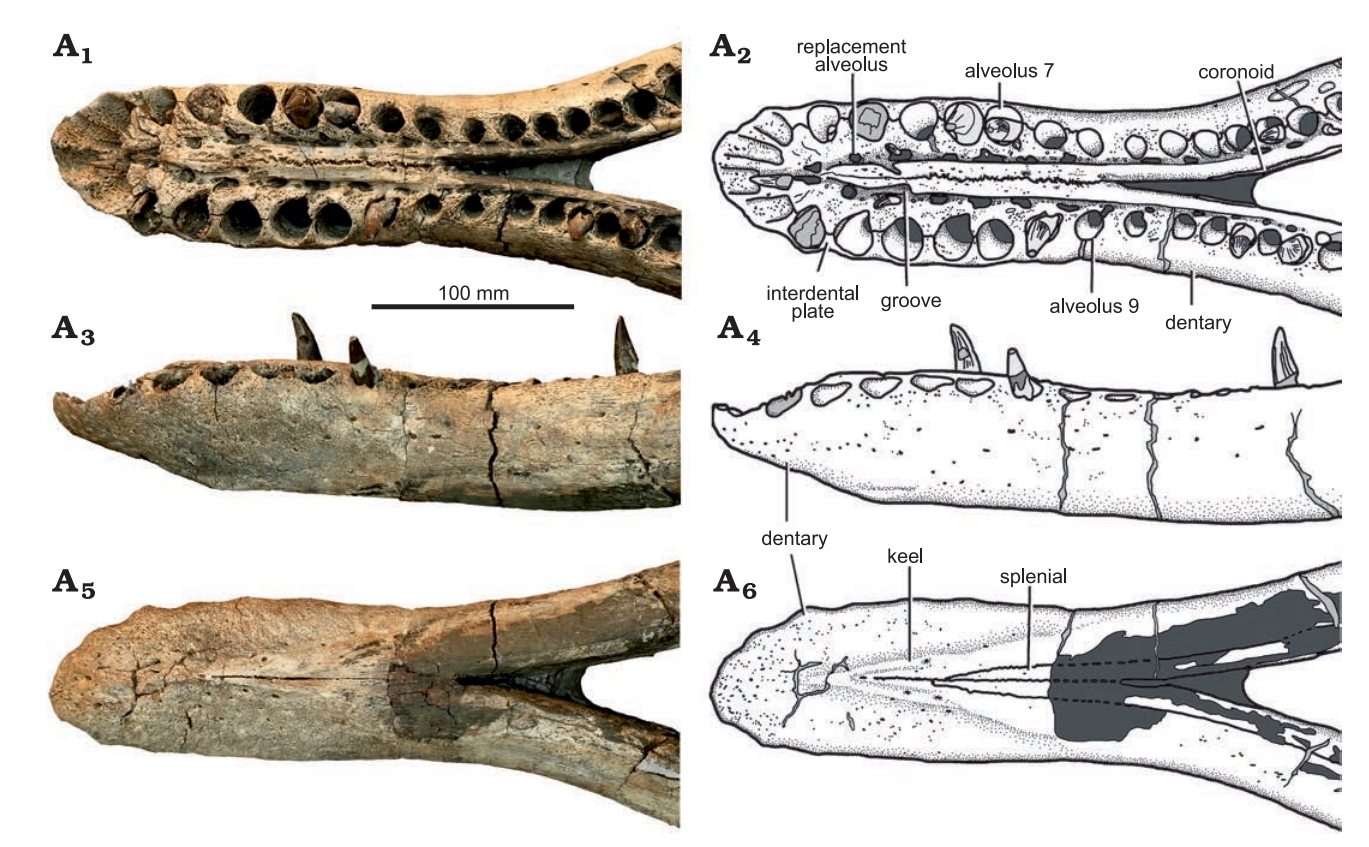
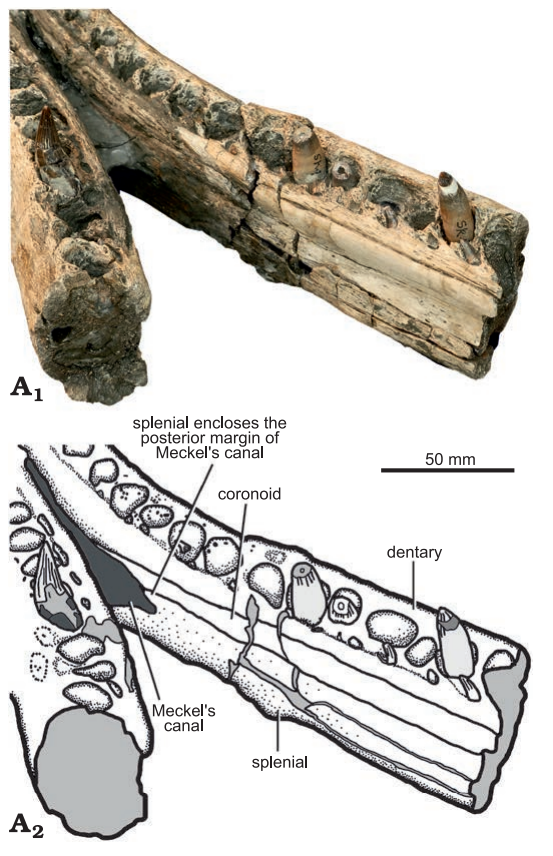
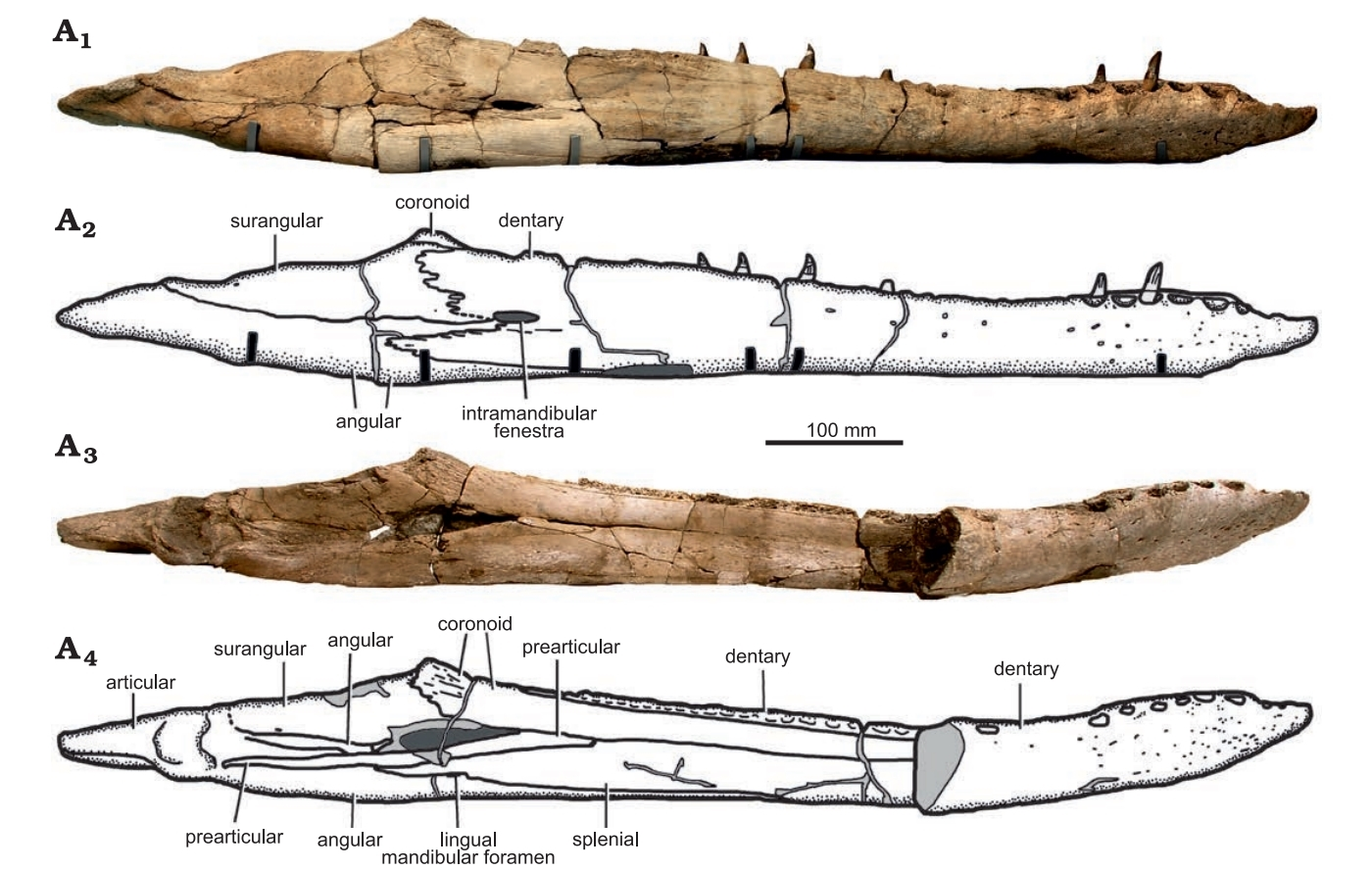
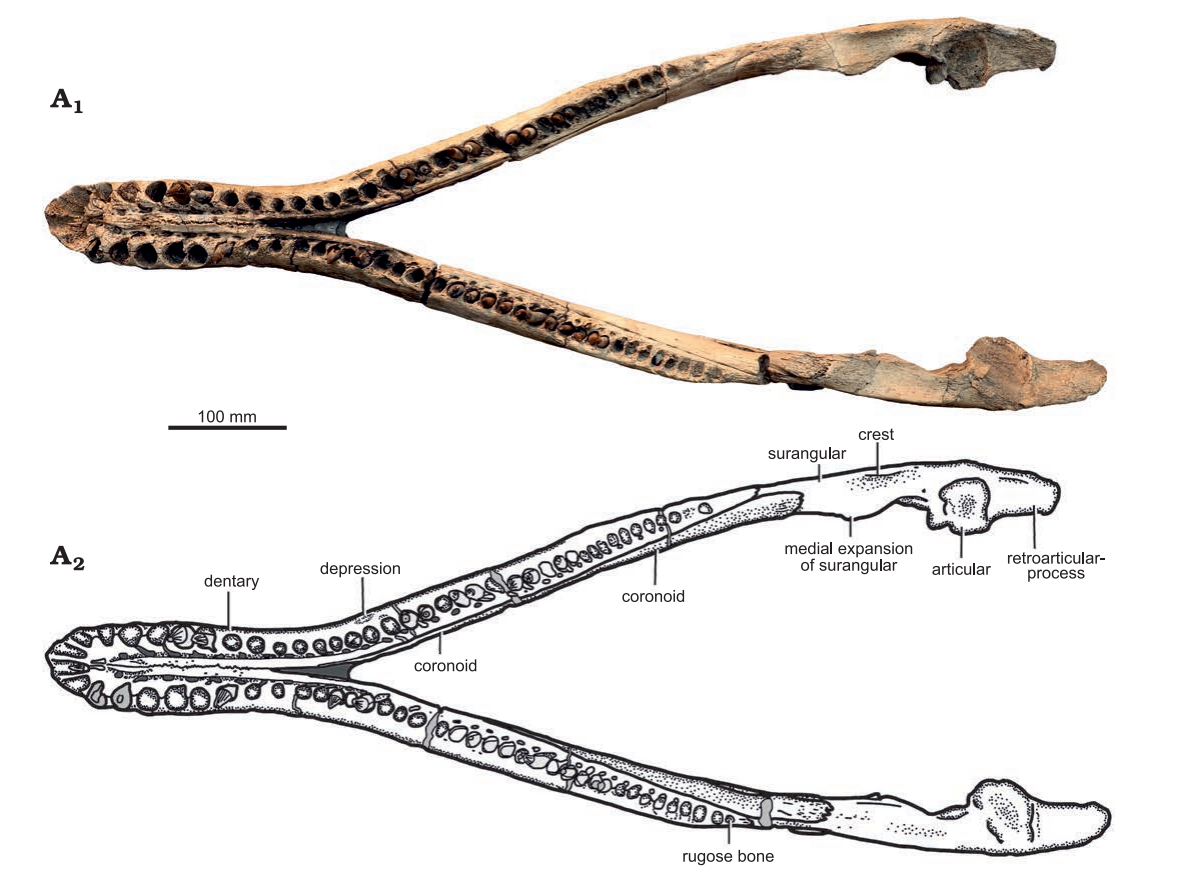
Holotype lower jaw and dentary tip in multiple views with respective schematic drawings

While the premaxillae form the tip of the snout and front of the tooth row, the sides of the rostrum is formed by the maxillae, which contain the majority of teeth. Based on the better preserved maxilla, Eardasaurus may have possessed thirty-four to thirty-five teeth. This is a high number of teeth, far exceeding Liopleurodon (20 teeth) and even derived Cretaceous taxa including Stenorhynchosaurus (30 teeth). Like the premaxillary teeth, the teeth of the maxillae are anisodont, reaching their largest size with the fifth tooth before gradually decreasing in size towards the back of the toothrow. The maxillae extend far back, but do not contribute to the margins of the orbit. The nares are placed between the maxilla and the frontal bones. The jugal is unusually large for a plesiosaur and forms the posteroventral edge of the orbits before extending back to meet the squamosal. The jugal is covered by a series of fluted grooves which are typically found around the orbits in other thalassophoneans, but Eardasaurus is the only member of the group with the ornamentation present on the jugal bones. The contact between the jugal and squamosal is step-like, with the later forming a process that overlays the jugal bone. This differs from the contact in other pliosaurs, which is typically interlocking. Eardasaurus may have possessed a distinct bone similar to the lacrimal bone observed in other animals, even if the two bones are not homologous with one another. Such a bone is present in other pliosaurs as well, however it is unclear if this structure is an entirely unique bone or a process of the jugal. The poorly preserved nature of this region of the skull leaves the bones origin ambiguous.

The mandible is preserved almost in its entirety, only missing small sections at its anterior-most tip. It measures 932 mm (36.7 in) long and 356 mm (14.0 in). The dentary forms the symphysis of the mandible and houses thirty-eight teeth before terminating just behind the end of the toothrow. The symphysis is relatively short compared to other pliosaurids, only containing the first nine teeth, including the largest dentary teeth (tooth three - tooth seven). These teeth correlate with the widest point of the symphysis and are followed by a significant size decrease. The eighth dentary alveolus is only 60% the diameter of the one preceding it and is followed by continuously smaller alveoli. Besides being anisodont, the teeth towards the tip of the snout are generally large and conical with a slight curvature. All surfaces of the tooth bear distinct vertical ridges formed by the tooth enamel, however they are most densely packed on the inner side of the tooth. Most of these ridges originate at the base of the crown, but some begin higher up and take on a carinae-like appearance. While the enamel ridges continue to be present on the posterior teeth, the carinae-like ridges are only found on the teeth at the front of the skull.

== Classification ==
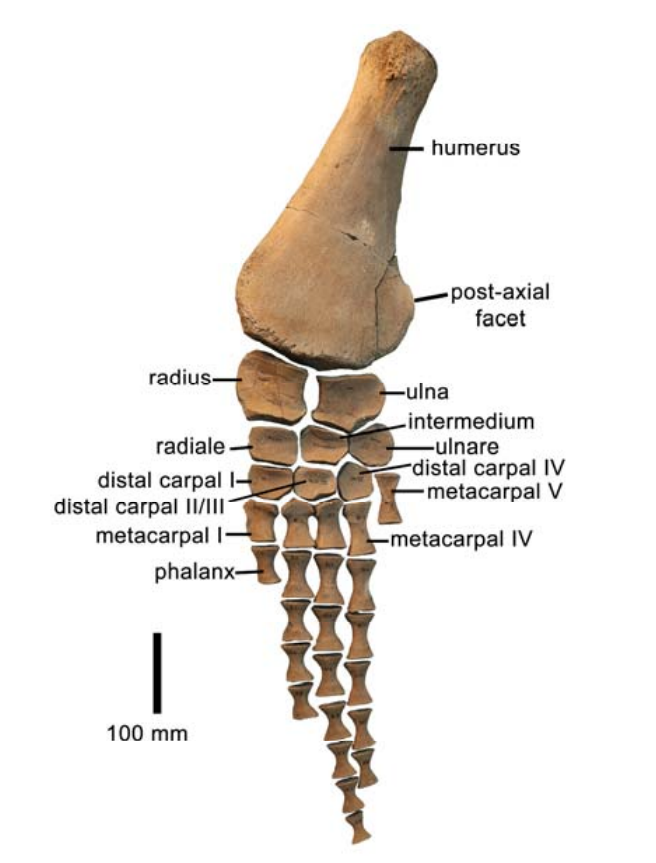
Front flipper from the holotype

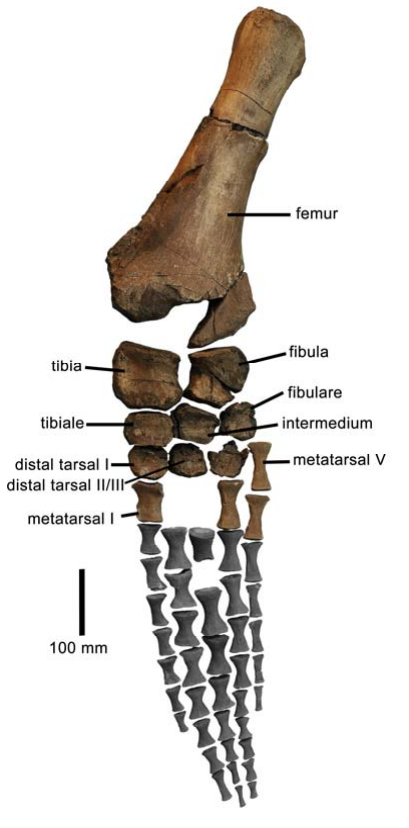
Hind flipper from the holotype

The phylogenetic analysis conducted for Eardasaurus is generally consistent with other analysis regarding the internal relationships within Pliosauridae. Eardasaurus was recovered as an early-diverging thalassophonean, more basal than Liopleurodon, Simolestes and the Brachaucheninae.

- - - Hauffiosaurus zanoni
    - - Hauffiosaurus longirostris
      - Hauffiosaurus tomistomimus
  - - Marmornectes candrewi
    - Thalassophonea
      - Anguanax zignoi
      - - Peloneustes philarchus
        - - Eardasaurus powelli
          - - "Pliosaurus" andrewsi
            - - Simolestes vorax
              - - Liopleurodon ferox
                - - Pliosaurus
                  - Brachaucheninae

== Paleobiology ==
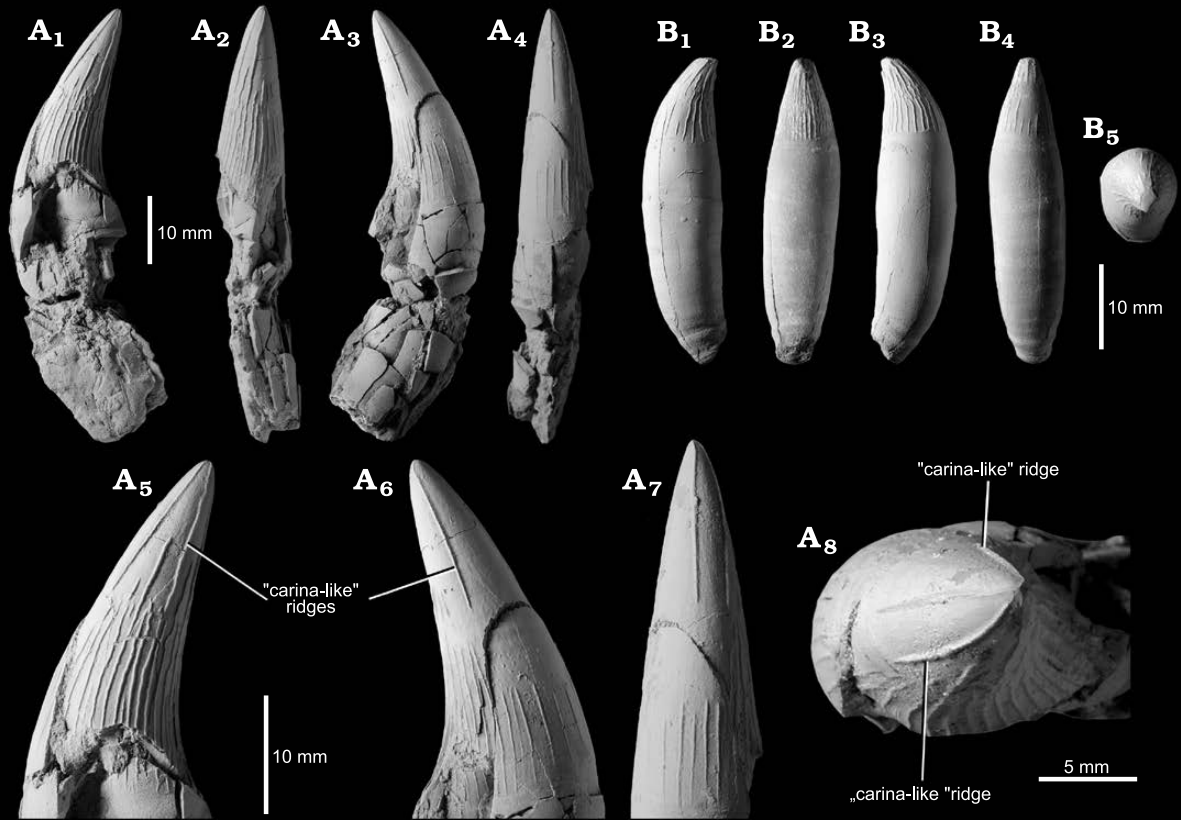
Teeth of Eardasaurus, showing the prominent enamel ridges

The enamel ridges present on the teeth of Eardasaurus are thought to have formed carinae-like cutting edges that likely held a significant ecological importance. The enhanced cutting ability given to the teeth by these ridges is commonly thought to be indicative of a diet consisting of large prey items, and such ridges are observed in other pliosaurids like Pliosaurus and Liopleurodon, which at times bear additional serration. Compared to Liopleurodon however, the carinae-ridges of Eardasaurus are much finer with weaker serration. Nevertheless, the distinction between regular enamel ridges and carinae-like ridges is still highly pronounced. Ketchum and Benson subsequently suggest that such enamel ridges may be much more widespread among plesiosaurs than previously assumed.
