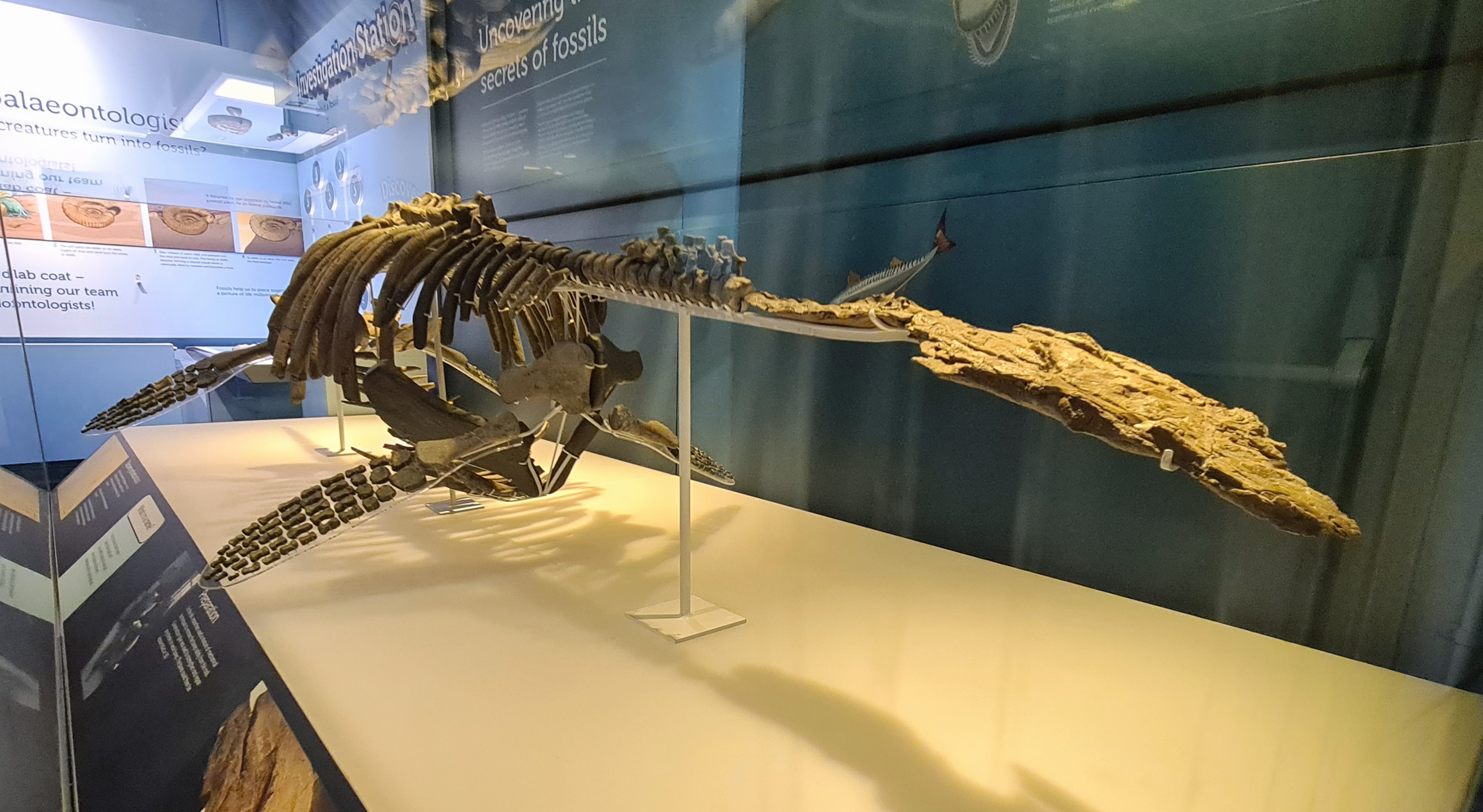
- Holotype fossil, Peterborough Museum

Scientific classification
- Domain: Eukaryota
- Kingdom: Animalia
- Phylum: Chordata
- Class: Reptilia
- Superorder: †Sauropterygia
- Order: †Plesiosauria
- Family: †Pliosauridae
- Genus: †Pachycostasaurus; Cruickshank et al., 1996
- Species: †P. dawni

Binomial name
- †Pachycostasaurus dawni Cruickshank et al., 1996

= Pachycostasaurus =

Pachycostasaurus Temporal range: Middle Jurassic

Extinct species of reptile

Pachycostasaurus (meaning 'thick-ribbed lizard') is an extinct Pliosauroid from the Oxford Clay formation of Peterborough, England.

== History and naming ==
The holotype fossil of Pachycostasaurus was discovered by Alan Dawn, an amateur geologist and museum volunteer, in what is now a quarry in Peterborough. The fossil was described in 1996 by Palaeontologists Arthur Cruickshank, David Martill and Leslie Noè, due to its distinct set of features not present in contemporary pliosaurids Liopleurodon and Simolestes.

== Description ==
The type species, P. dawni, is represented by a single near complete specimen (PETMG R338) which was approximately 3 metres (9.8 ft) long.

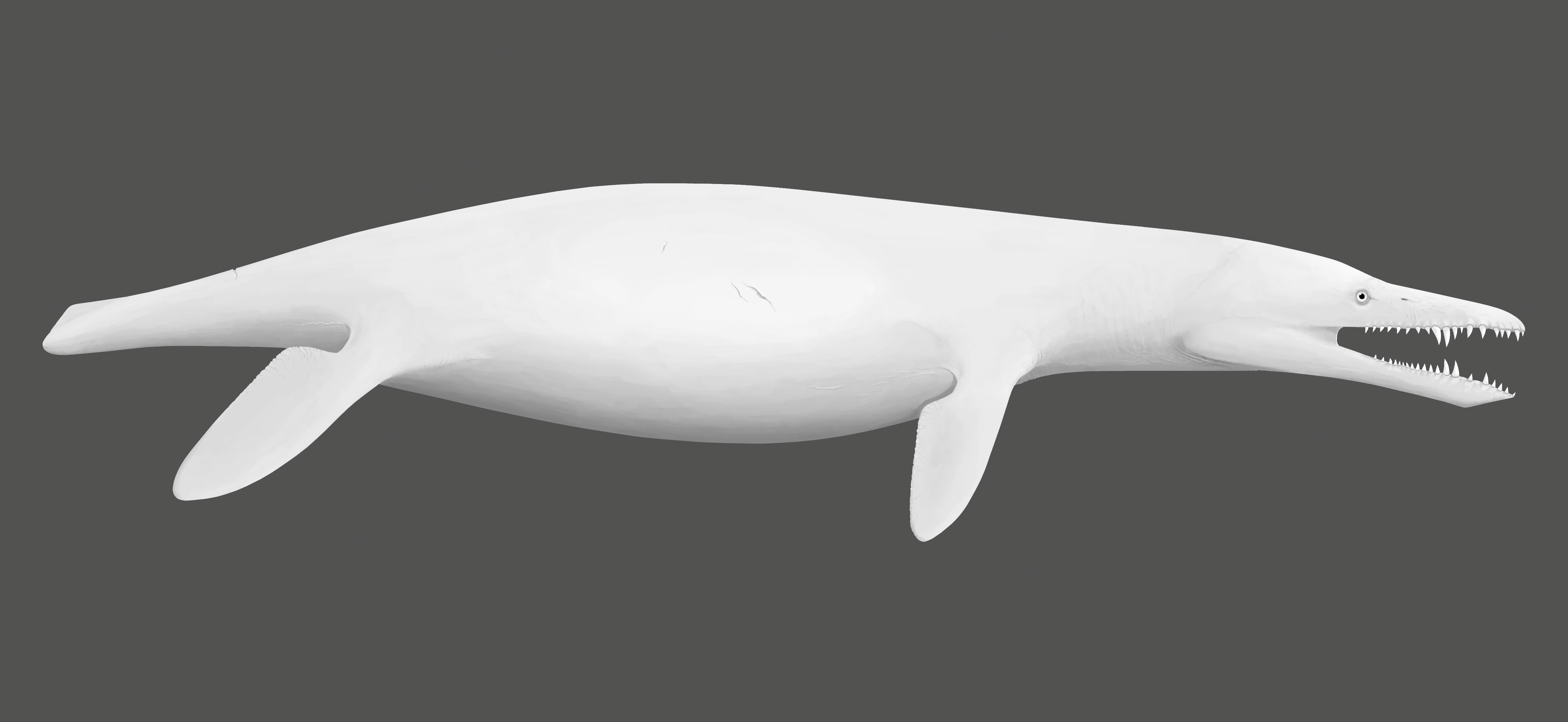
Reconstruction

Perhaps the most defining feature of this genus is the large, pachyostic ribs and gastralia described as ‘sausage-like’ in profile. Pachyostosis is known from a number of Pliosaurid genera (for example Monquirasaurus), and is present in modern animals such as Sirenians (Dugong and Manatees). This robust, barrel shaped torso, coupled with a relatively short neck and small flippers, indicate that it was not an agile swimmer. Histological sections taken from these elements show that they are osteosclerotic as well (combined, this represents the condition pachyosteosclerosis).

The holotypic specimen possessed five stout and conical tooth pairs on the mandibular symphysis (the length of which is a clear characteristic of the genus in comparison to other contemporary Pliosaurids Simolestes and Liopleurodon). Its head was about 20% of overall body length, typical for most Pliosaurids of its time. The specimen had a cervical vertebral count of at least 13, these vertebrae having shortened centra and an enlarged neural canal, which were not heavily ossified except in the region of the neural spine (the neural spines themselves were not fused to the centra, which suggests that the specimen was not fully grown; however, this could also be a Paedomorphic trait.) The pectoral centra of the specimen are triangular in outline, and the dorsal vertebral centra are heavily ossified, with indistinct subcentral foramina and flat anterior and posterior faces. The anterior and posterior Zygapophyses on the dorsal vertebrae are reduced, however the neural spines thickened, with midline anterior and posterior excavations. This is one of the other main characteristics of the genus. The humeri of Pachycostasaurus are short, small compared to its body size, and lightly constructed.

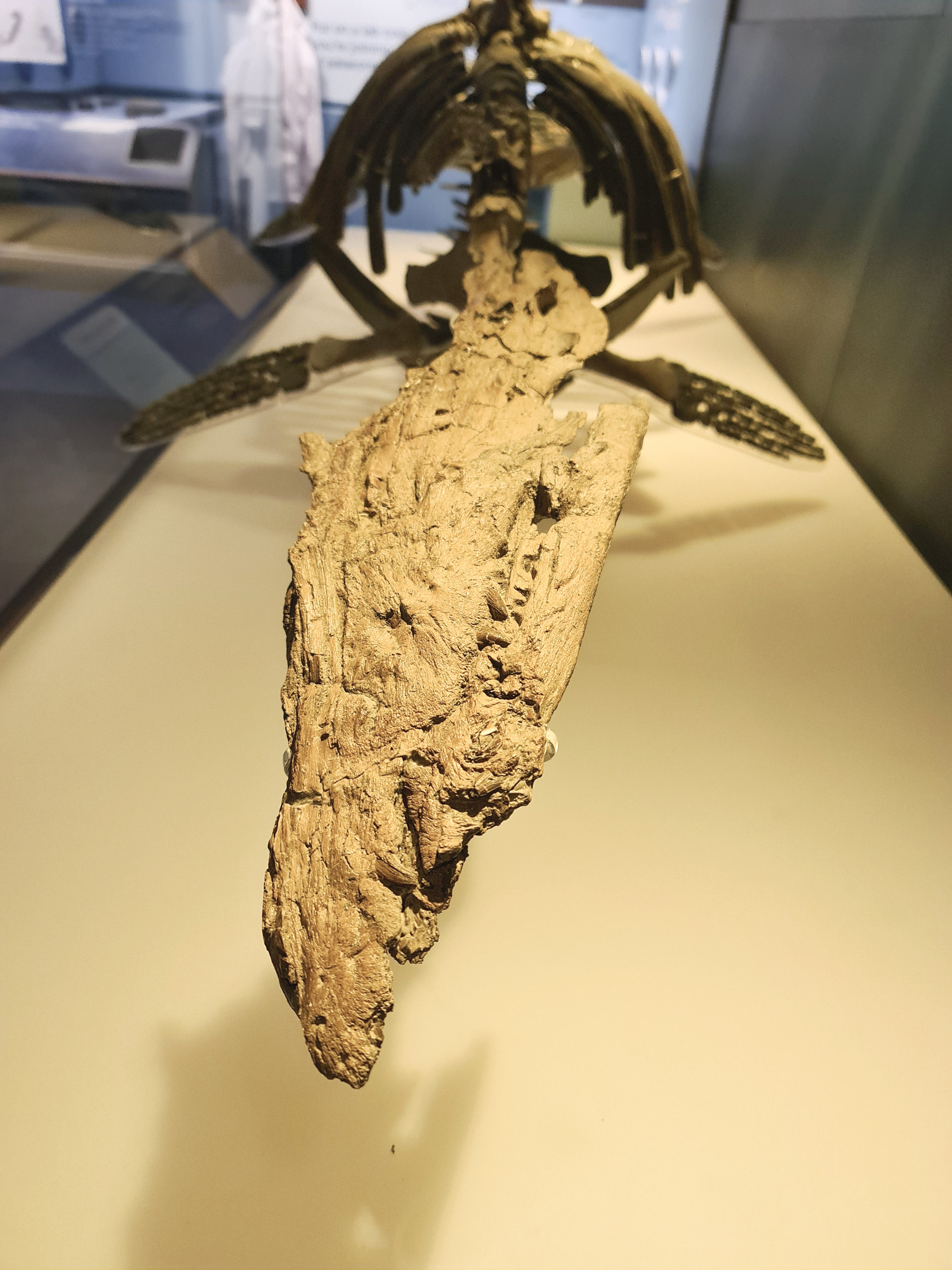
Front view of holotype specimen

It has been suggested that even though the holotypic individual appears to be a juvenile or sub-adult, its age is probably not solely responsible for these unusual bone structures.

== Palaeobiology ==
Judging by its anatomy, Pachycostasaurus was most probably a benthic predator. The relative size and shape of its teeth indicate a diet ranging from soft teuthoids, such as belemnites, to bony fish, and perhaps some of the larger reptiles. Pachycostasaurus has a lightly constructed skull, a short, rather weak jaw symphysis, and ventral ballast for stability which would have resisted roll. Thus it is doubtful if Pachycostasaurus was a twist feeder like other contemporary pliosaurids.

The rarity of the animal in the formation may suggest that Pachycostasaurus was allochthonous. Dinosaur remains from the quarry were likely swept by freshwater in to the marine basin present, implicating that the holotype specimen may have been a freshwater / estuarine inhabitant drifted in to the marine environment by rivers. However, more coastal and quasi-marine sediments of the formation have yet to yield any plesiosaur remains. Another, perhaps less likely explanation is that Pachycostasaurus was a deep sea inhabitant from further offshore, and drifted or travelled to the shallow marine location before fossilisation.

== See also ==
- List of plesiosaur genera
- Timeline of plesiosaur research
