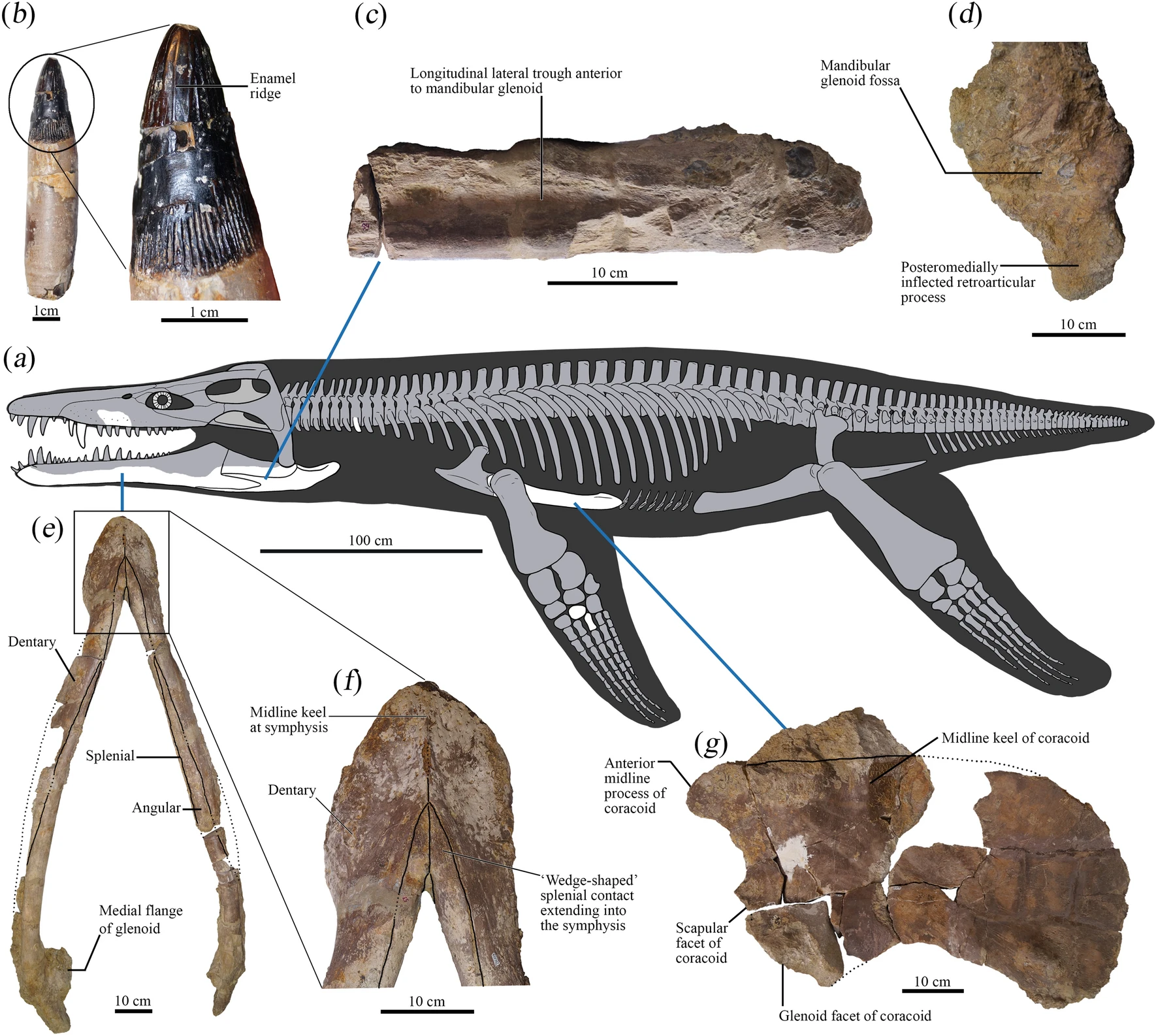
- Fossils of holotype (MNHNL BU159) and skeletal reconstruction of L. keileni

Scientific classification
- Domain: Eukaryota
- Kingdom: Animalia
- Phylum: Chordata
- Class: Reptilia
- Superorder: †Sauropterygia
- Order: †Plesiosauria
- Family: †Pliosauridae
- Genus: †Lorrainosaurus
- Species: †L. keileni

Binomial name
- †Lorrainosaurus keileni Sachs et al., 2023

Synonyms
- Simolestes keileni Godefroit, 1994

= Lorrainosaurus =

Lorrainosaurus Temporal range: Bajocian, Middle Jurassic, 168.5–168.3 Ma

Extinct genus of reptiles

Lorrainosaurus is an extinct genus of thalassophonean pliosaurid from the Middle Jurassic of Lorraine, France.

== Discovery and naming ==
The holotype specimen (MNHNL BU159) was discovered during a temporary excavation for a roadway upgrade between the Montois-la-Montagne and Sainte-Marie-aux-Chênes communes in Lorraine, France. The remains consisted of a near-complete mandible, coracoid shoulder bone, a tooth, and fragments of the upper jaw and front limb. They specifically originated from a section of the Marnes de Gravelotte, a marl deposit dated to the Bajocian stage of the Middle Jurassic around 168 mya. The specimen first came under the study of paleontologist Pascal Godefroit in 1994, who described it as a new species of Simolestes and assigned the name S. keileni.

The generic identification was doubted by the PhD thesis of Noè (2001), but it was not until at least 2021 that the holotype began to be rigorously reexamined by Sven Sachs of the Bielefeld Natural History Museum. Sachs published his results in a 2023 multi-authored study, which found that MNHNL BU159 belonged to a more derived lineage than Simolestes. This thus warranted a new genus, which they named Lorrainosaurus, a portmanteau of the type locality Lorraine and Ancient Greek σαῦρος (sauros, "reptile").

== Description ==
Lorrainosaurus was a fairly small pliosaur. When extrapolating the length of the holotype's full-length mandible (133 centimeters (52 in)) to the proportions of the closely related Stenorhynchosaurus, which is represented by a near-complete skeleton with a mandible close to one-third of the total animal's length, (Note: Inferred from Páramo-Fonseca et al. (2019), which estimated the total length of a Stenorhynchosaurus specimen with a 200 cm (79 in) mandible to be 7.00 meters (22.97 ft). This makes the mandible about 28.6% of the total length.) a total length of 4.66 meters (15.3 ft) for L. keileni can be estimated.

== See also ==
- List of plesiosaur genera
- Timeline of plesiosaur research
