= Oxford Clay =

Jurassic rock formation in southeast England

- Stratigraphic range: Middle to Late Jurassic (Callovian-Oxfordian), 165–159 Ma
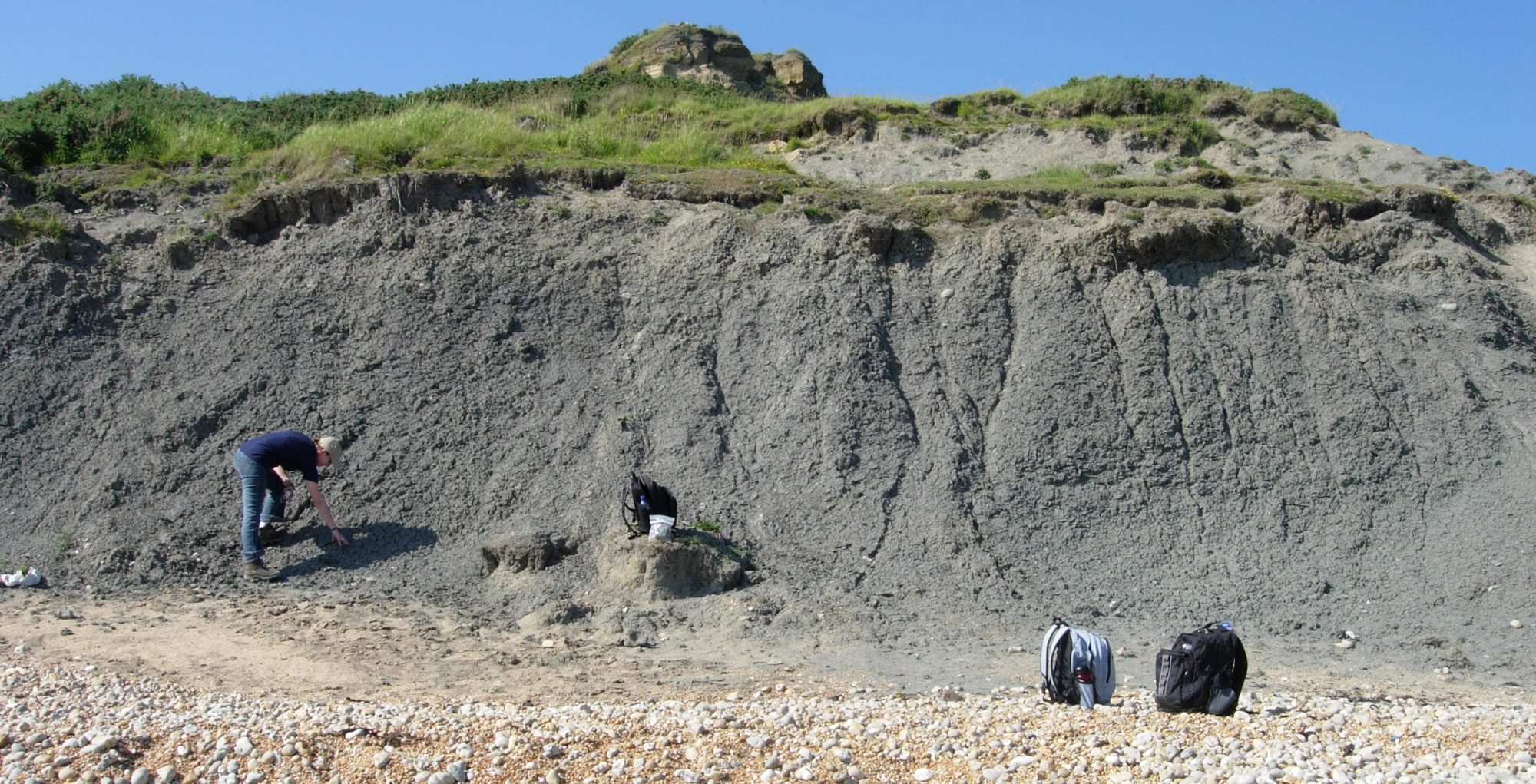
- Coastal exposure of the Oxford Clay Formation near Weymouth
- Type: Geological formation
- Unit of: Ancholme Group
- Sub-units: Peterborough Member, Stewartby Member, Weymouth Member
- Underlies: West Walton Formation, Corallian Group
- Overlies: Kellaways Formation, Osgodby Formation
- Thickness: Up to 185 metres, typically 50 to 70 m on East Midlands Shelf

Lithology
- Primary: Claystone
- Other: Mudstone

Location
- Region: Oxford, Peterborough, Dorset, Yorkshire
- Country: England

Type section
- Named for: Oxford

The Oxford Clay (or Oxford Clay Formation) is a Jurassic marine sedimentary rock formation underlying much of southeast England, from as far west as Dorset and as far north as Yorkshire. The Oxford Clay Formation dates to the Jurassic, specifically, the Callovian and Oxfordian ages, and comprises two main facies. The lower facies comprises the Peterborough Member, a fossiliferous organic-rich mudstone. This facies and its rocks are commonly known as lower Oxford Clay. The upper facies comprises the middle Oxford Clay, the Stewartby Member, and the upper Oxford Clay, the Weymouth Member. The upper facies is a fossil poor assemblage of calcareous mudstones.

Oxford Clay appears at the surface around Oxford, Peterborough and Weymouth and is exposed in many quarries around these areas. The top of the Lower Oxford Clay shows a lithological change, where fissile shale changes to grey mudstone. The Middle and Upper Oxford Clays differ slightly, as they are separated by an argillaceous limestone in the South Midlands.

== Palaeontology ==
The Oxford Clay is well known for its rich fossil record of fish and invertebrates. Many of the fossils are well preserved, occasionally some are found exceptionally well preserved. Animals which lived in the Oxford Clay Sea include plesiosaurs, marine crocodiles, ichthyosaurs, cephalopods (such as belemnites), bivalves (such as Gryphaea), and a variety of gastropods. Dinosaur eggs are stratigraphically present in the Lower Oxford Clay. Geographically, they are located in Cambridgeshire, England.

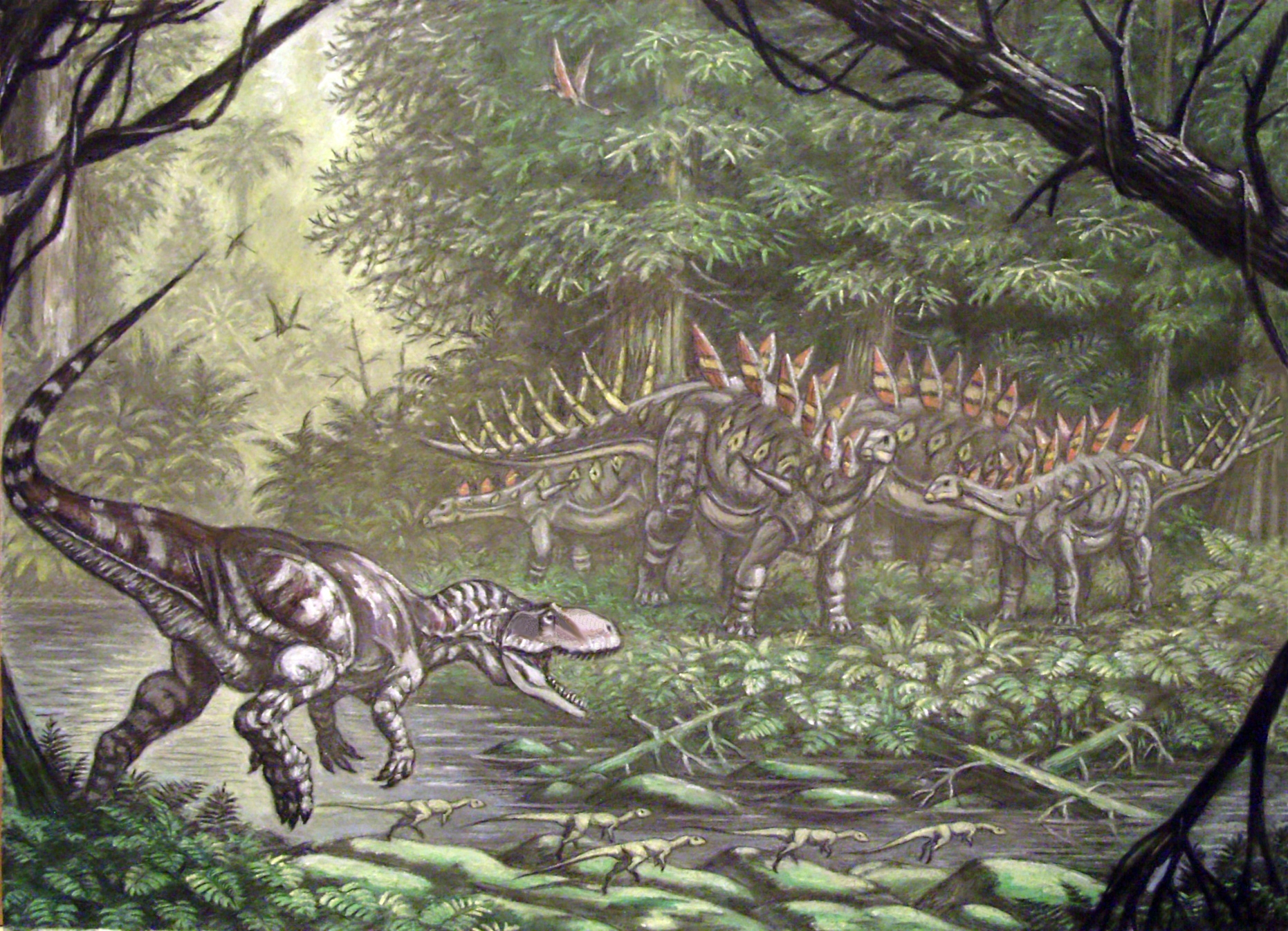
Life restoration of Eustreptospondylus and Lexovisaurus in the Oxford Clay environment

== Fossil Content ==
Color key: Taxon / Reclassified taxon / Taxon falsely reported as present / Dubious taxon or junior synonym / Ichnotaxon / Ootaxon / Morphotaxon	Notes; Uncertain or tentative taxa are in small text; ~~crossed out~~ taxa are discredited.

=== Dinosaurs ===
==== Ornithischians ====
Indeterminate euronithopod remains stratigraphically present in the Lower Oxford Clay and geographically located in Cambridgeshire, England.

Ornithischians of the Oxford Clay
Genus	Species	Location	Stratigraphic position	Material	Notes	Images
Callovosaurus	C. leedsi	Cambridgeshire	Lower	"Femur."	An iguanodontian dryosaur.	Callovosaurus Lexovisaurus
Lexovisaurus	L. durobivensis	Cambridgeshire; Dorset	Lower	A holotype pelvis.	A stegosaur	Callovosaurus Lexovisaurus
Lexovisaurus	Indeterminate	Bedfordshire			A stegosaur	Callovosaurus Lexovisaurus
Loricatosaurus	L. priscus	Cambridgeshire	Lower		A stegosaur.	Callovosaurus Lexovisaurus
Sarcolestes	S. leedsi	Cambridgeshire	Lower	"Partial mandible."	An ankylosaur.	Callovosaurus Lexovisaurus

==== Saurischians ====
Saurischians of the Oxford Clay
Genus	Species	Location	Stratigraphic position	Material	Notes	Images
Cetiosauriscus	C. stewarti	Cambridgeshire	Lower	"Rear half of a skeleton."		Cetiosauriscus Eustreptospondylus Metriacanthosaurus
Eustreptospondylus	E. oxoniensis	Oxfordshire	Upper	Disarticulated skull and skeleton, with some referred limb elements.		Cetiosauriscus Eustreptospondylus Metriacanthosaurus
Sauropoda	Indeterminate	Wiltshire; Cambridgeshire			The caudal vertebrae from Cambridgeshire were mistakenly considered part of the syntypic series of "Ornithopsis" leedsi by Upchurch and Martin (2003).	Cetiosauriscus Eustreptospondylus Metriacanthosaurus
Theropoda	Indeterminate	Oxfordshire	Middle			Cetiosauriscus Eustreptospondylus Metriacanthosaurus
Metriacanthosaurus	M. parkeri	Weymouth	Upper			Cetiosauriscus Eustreptospondylus Metriacanthosaurus

=== Pterosaurs ===
Additional indeterminate pterosaur material is stratigraphically present in the Weymouth and Peterborough Members.

Pterosaurs of the Oxford Clay
Genus	Species	Location	Stratigraphic position	Material	Notes	Images
Rhamphorhynchinae indet.			Stewartby Member	Scapulocoracoid, humerus, ulna	Possibly cf. Rhamphorhynchus	
"Rhamphorhynchus"	"R." jessoni	Cambridgeshire	Weymouth Member		Indeterminate non-monofenestratan pterosaur	

=== Ichthyosaurs ===
Genus	Species	Location	Member	Abundance	Notes	Images
Ophthalmosaurus	O. icenicus			Specimens consist of skulls, limb bones, and partial skeletons	A ophthalmosaurid ichthyosaur	

=== Plesiosaurs ===
Genus	Species	Location	Member	Abundance	Notes	Images
Cryptoclidus	C. eurymerus				A cryptoclidid	Cryptoclidus Eardasaurus Liopleurodon Muraenosaurus Pachycostasaurus Peloneustes Simolestes
Cryptoclidus	C. richardsoni				A cryptoclidid	Cryptoclidus Eardasaurus Liopleurodon Muraenosaurus Pachycostasaurus Peloneustes Simolestes
Eardasaurus	E. powelli				A thalassophonean pliosaurid	Cryptoclidus Eardasaurus Liopleurodon Muraenosaurus Pachycostasaurus Peloneustes Simolestes
Liopleurodon	L. ferox				A thalassophonean pliosaurid	Cryptoclidus Eardasaurus Liopleurodon Muraenosaurus Pachycostasaurus Peloneustes Simolestes
Liopleurodon	L. pachydeirus				A thalassophonean pliosaurid; probably a junior synonym of L.ferox	Cryptoclidus Eardasaurus Liopleurodon Muraenosaurus Pachycostasaurus Peloneustes Simolestes
Marmornectes	M. candrewi				A pliosaurid	Cryptoclidus Eardasaurus Liopleurodon Muraenosaurus Pachycostasaurus Peloneustes Simolestes
Muraenosaurus	M. leedsi				A cryptoclidid	Cryptoclidus Eardasaurus Liopleurodon Muraenosaurus Pachycostasaurus Peloneustes Simolestes
Pachycostasaurus	P. dawnii				A pliosaurid	Cryptoclidus Eardasaurus Liopleurodon Muraenosaurus Pachycostasaurus Peloneustes Simolestes
Peloneustes	P. philarchus				A thalassophonean pliosaurid	Cryptoclidus Eardasaurus Liopleurodon Muraenosaurus Pachycostasaurus Peloneustes Simolestes
Picrocleidus	P. beloclis				A cryptoclidid	Cryptoclidus Eardasaurus Liopleurodon Muraenosaurus Pachycostasaurus Peloneustes Simolestes
Pliosaurus	P. andrewsi				A thalassophonean pliosaurid; represents a new genus distinct from Pliosaurus	Cryptoclidus Eardasaurus Liopleurodon Muraenosaurus Pachycostasaurus Peloneustes Simolestes
Simolestes	S. vorax				A thalassophonean pliosaurid	Cryptoclidus Eardasaurus Liopleurodon Muraenosaurus Pachycostasaurus Peloneustes Simolestes
Tricleidus	T. seeleyi				A cryptoclidid	Cryptoclidus Eardasaurus Liopleurodon Muraenosaurus Pachycostasaurus Peloneustes Simolestes

=== Pachycormiformes ===
Genus	Species	Location	Member	Abundance	Notes	Images
Leedsichthys	L. problematicus				Giant filter feeding pachycormiform	
Martillichthys	M. renwickae				Filter feeding pachyocormiform	
Paraorthocormus	P. tenuirostris				Carnivorous pachycormiform	

=== Thalattosuchians ===
Genus	Species	Location	Member	Abundance	Notes	Images
Lemmysuchus	L. obtusidens				A teleosauroid belonging to the Machimosauridae	Neosteneosaurus specimen (from an unknown location) Thalattosuchus Suchodus Tyrannoneustes
Charitomenosuchus	C. leedsi				A machimosaurid teleosauroid	Neosteneosaurus specimen (from an unknown location) Thalattosuchus Suchodus Tyrannoneustes
Steneosaurus	S. edwardsi				Now referred to Neosteneosaurus.	Neosteneosaurus specimen (from an unknown location) Thalattosuchus Suchodus Tyrannoneustes
Steneosaurus	S. durobrivensis				Junior synonym of N. edwardsi.	Neosteneosaurus specimen (from an unknown location) Thalattosuchus Suchodus Tyrannoneustes
Neosteneosaurus	N. edwardsi				A machimosaurid teleosauroid	Neosteneosaurus specimen (from an unknown location) Thalattosuchus Suchodus Tyrannoneustes
Mycterosuchus	M. leedsi				A teleosaurid teleosauroid	Neosteneosaurus specimen (from an unknown location) Thalattosuchus Suchodus Tyrannoneustes
Metriorhynchus	M. superciliosus				This species was referred to a new genus, Thalattosuchus.	Neosteneosaurus specimen (from an unknown location) Thalattosuchus Suchodus Tyrannoneustes
Thalattosuchus	T. superciliosus				A metriorhynchine metriorhynchid	Neosteneosaurus specimen (from an unknown location) Thalattosuchus Suchodus Tyrannoneustes
Gracilineustes	G. leedsi				A metriorhynchine metriorhynchid	Neosteneosaurus specimen (from an unknown location) Thalattosuchus Suchodus Tyrannoneustes
Suchodus	S. brachyrhynchus				A geosaurine metriorhynchid	Neosteneosaurus specimen (from an unknown location) Thalattosuchus Suchodus Tyrannoneustes
Suchodus	S. durobrivensis				A geosaurine metriorhynchid	Neosteneosaurus specimen (from an unknown location) Thalattosuchus Suchodus Tyrannoneustes
Tyrannoneustes	T. lythrodectikos				A geosaurine metriorhynchid	Neosteneosaurus specimen (from an unknown location) Thalattosuchus Suchodus Tyrannoneustes

== Economic use ==
Oxford Clay has a porous consistency and is soft and is often used in the making of roads. It is also the source of the Fletton stock brick of which much of London is built. For brick making, the Oxford Clay has the advantage of containing carbon which provides part of the fuel required in firing it so reducing the requirement for an external fuel source.

== See also ==
- List of fossil sites (with link directory)
- List of dinosaur-bearing rock formations
- Kimmeridge Clay
- London Clay
- Weald Clay
