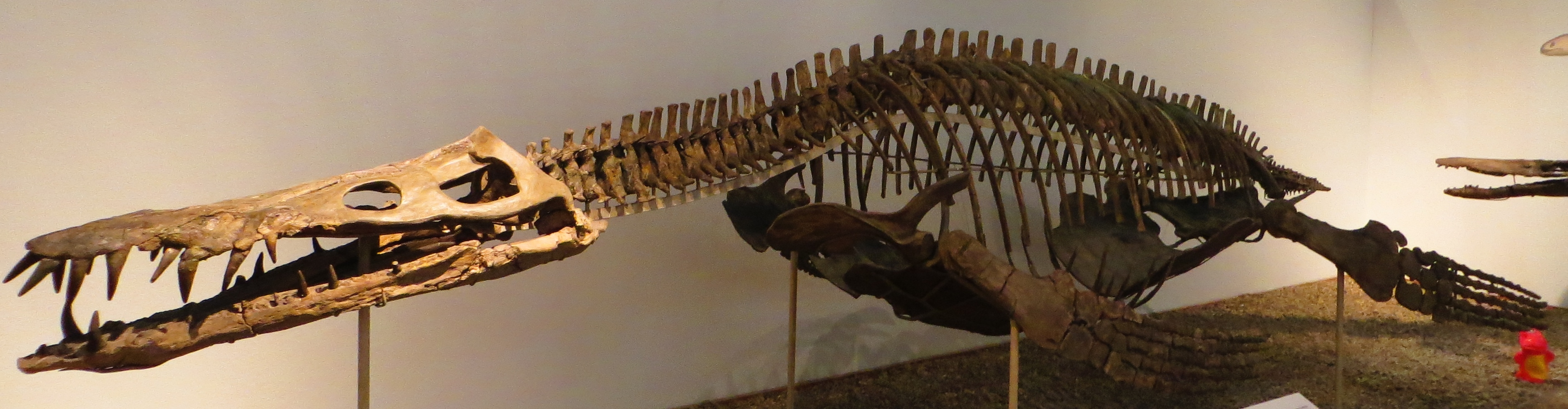
- L. ferox skeleton, Museum of Paleontology, Tübingen

Scientific classification
- Kingdom: Animalia
- Phylum: Chordata
- Class: Reptilia
- Superorder: †Sauropterygia
- Order: †Plesiosauria
- Suborder: †Pliosauroidea
- Family: †Pliosauridae
- Clade: †Thalassophonea
- Genus: †Liopleurodon; Sauvage, 1873

Type species
- †Liopleurodon ferox Sauvage, 1873

Other species
- †?L. pachydeirus (Seeley, 1869)

Synonyms
- Pliosaurus ferox (Sauvage, 1873) Lydekker, 1888; Pliosaurus pachydeirus Seeley, 1869; ?Ischyrodon meriani von Meyer, 1838

= Liopleurodon =

Liopleurodon Temporal range: Middle Jurassic to Late Jurassic (Callovian to Kimmeridgian), 166–155 Ma

Extinct Pliosaurid marine reptile

Liopleurodon (/ˌlaɪoʊˈplʊərədɒn/; meaning 'smooth-sided teeth') is an extinct genus of carnivorous pliosaurid plesiosaurs that lived from the Callovian stage of the Middle Jurassic to the Kimmeridgian stage of the Late Jurassic period (approximately 166 to 155 million years ago). The type species is L. ferox, which is probably the only valid species. Although some studies still recognize L. pachydeirus, it is generally considered as a junior synonym of the type species due to the lack of a clear diagnosis. Fossils attributed to Liopleurodon, including some skeletons, are mainly known from Europe, with one occurrence reported in Mexico. As the holotype specimen of L. ferox consists of a single tooth with questionable distinguishing features, several recent studies recommend the designation a more complete neotype to preserve its validity. Additional species were proposed, but these are currently viewed as belonging to other pliosaurid genera.

Like other plesiosaurs, Liopleurodon has four flippers, a short tail, and, like most pliosaurids, a long head and a short neck. In 1999, its size was greatly exaggerated in the BBC documentary series Walking with Dinosaurs, where it was depicted as reaching 25 m (82 ft) in length. However, the different attributed specimens show that the animal could reach a size ranging from 2.46 to 8.09 m (8 ft 1 in to 26 ft 7 in) long. Various studies show that Liopleurodon would have been an ambush predator, feeding on fish, cephalopods and other marine reptiles.

== Research history ==
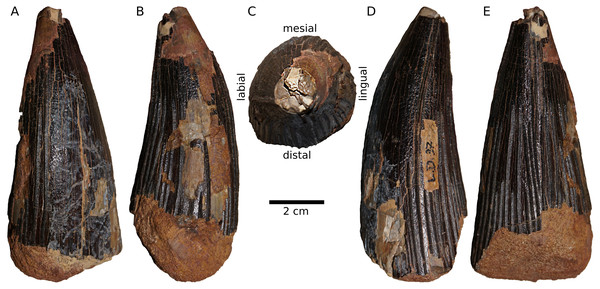
Holotype tooth crown of Ischyrodon meriani; in (A) mesial, (B) lingual, (C) apical, (D) labial, and (E) distal view

Even before Liopleurodon was named, material likely belonging to it was described in scientific literature. In 1838, Hermann von Meyer applied the name Ischyrodon meriani to a large tooth from possibly Callovian-aged rocks in Fricktal, Switzerland. This tooth lacks identifying characteristics, and therefore it is not clear what it belonged to, although Lambert Beverly Tarlo noted the possibility of it pertaining to Liopleurodon in 1960. A 2022 study by Daniel Madzia and colleagues noted that while the tooth likely came from Liopleurodon or a similar species, there was too little information available to make a confident assignment, so they treated Ischyrodon as a nomen dubium. In 1841, von Meyer named the species Thaumatosaurus oolithicus based on a fragmentary specimen consisting of partial teeth, skull elements, vertebrae, and ribs from deposits in Württemberg, Germany, possibly dating to the Oxfordian. However, this material is nondiagnostic, lacking distinguishing features. Johann Andreas Wagner published a description of a large plesiosaur tooth from Bavaria, Germany, in 1852, assigning it to a new species that he named Pliosaurus giganteus. However, in 1824, William Conybeare had named a species of Plesiosaurus, Plesiosaurus giganteus, and this species was later viewed as a synonym of either Pliosaurus brachydeirus or Pliosaurus brachyspondylus by following authors. Since the name Pliosaurus giganteus had been used prior to Wagner's publication, Wagner's name is invalid due to preoccupation. In 1860, Hermann Trautschold assigned the name Pliosaurus giganteus to a small tooth that was discovered in the Moscow Basin of Russia, dating from the Oxfordian. This tooth is now thought to pertain to Liopleurodon, but the name Pliosaurus giganteus having already been used twice by this point, Trautschold's name is also invalid.

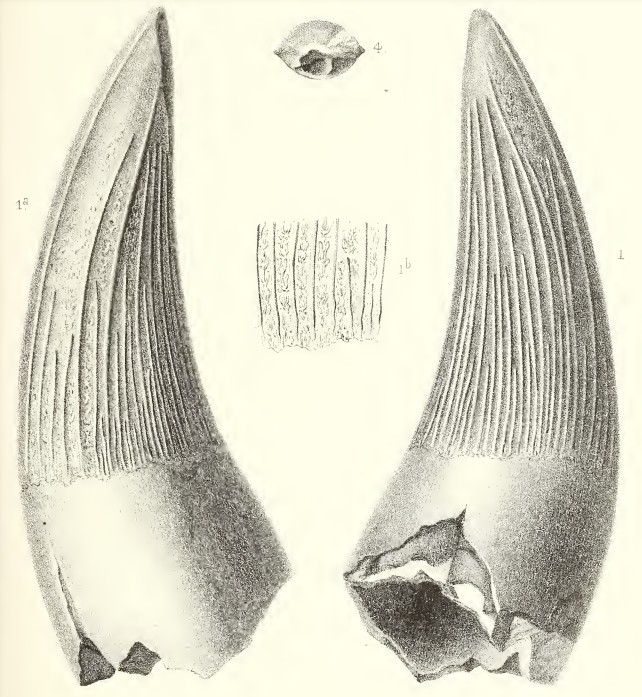
BHN 3R 197, the holotype tooth of L. ferox (Fig. 1)

The genus name Liopleurodon was coined by Henri Émile Sauvage in 1873. Sauvage named three species which he assigned to this genus, each based on a single tooth. The holotype tooth of Liopleurodon ferox was discovered in Le Wast, near Boulogne-sur-Mer, and is since numbered as BHN 3R 197 and stored in the Lille Natural History Museum. More precisely, the tooth consists of a crown measuring 7.5 centimetres (3.0 in) long, coming from sedimentary layers dating from the Callovian. Another tooth from Charly, since preserved at the Paris School of Mines, embodies the holotype of L. grossouvrei. This tooth is 7 centimetres (2.8 in) long, with the crown measuring 5.5 centimetres (2.2 in). The third, discovered near Caen, France, was originally attributed to Poikilopleuron bucklandi by Eudes Deslongchamps. While the tooth could have come from the megalosaur, Sauvage considered this identity unsubstantiated, and assigned it to the species Liopleurodon bucklandi. Sauvage did not ascribe the genus to any particular group of reptiles in his description. The genus name Liopleurodon derives from Ancient Greek λεῖος leios, "smooth"; πλευρά pleurá, "side" or "rib"; and ὀδόν odṓn, "tooth", all meaning "smooth-sided tooth", in reference to the very contrasting dentition of the animal. The specific name derives from Latin ferox, meaning "fierce", in reference to the large size of the teeth.

However, in 1880, Sauvage synonymized Liopleurodon with Polyptychodon, noting that it was similar to this genus, but distinct from Plesiosaurus and Pliosaurus. In 1888, Richard Lydekker, after studying some teeth attributable to Liopleurodon ferox in the Leeds Collection, concluded that they were so similar to those of Pliosaurus that they should be placed in that genus. These teeth had been collected by Alfred Leeds from the Oxford Clay Formation, near Peterborough, England. In 1869, Harry Govier Seeley had applied the name Pliosaurus pachydeirus to a series of cervical (neck) vertebrae representing the first 17 in the neck from the Oxford Clay Formation near Great Gransden. Other than its large size, Seeley provided no distinguishing characteristics. The specific name pachydeirus means "stout neck", due to its vertebral morphology. Lydekker stated in 1888 that the neck described by Seeley probably belonged to Pliosaurus ferox. Walerian Kiprijanoff named Thaumatosaurus mosquensis in 1883 based on remains including teeth, vertebrae, and limb bones from Oxfordian-aged rocks of the Moscow Basin. However, in 1889, Lydekker considered this species to be a probable junior synonym of P. ferox.

In 1905, John Frederick Blake described two teeth from Rushden, England, similar to those of other Liopleurodon ferox specimens, though from older strata than those from Peterborough. He noted that the teeth were quite different from those of Pliosaurus, while the bones were dissimilar to those of Polyptychodon. Since the species couldn't be assigned to either genus, he recommended reinstating the name Liopleurodon. After considering Liopleurodon to be a subgenus of Pliosaurus, N. Bogolubov also listed the two genera as distinct in 1912. When Lydekker had first visited the collection of Alfred Leeds (known as the Leeds Collection), the only remains of Liopleurodon in his collection were teeth. However, since then, Alfred Leeds, as well as his brother Charles Edward Leeds, had collected many more specimens of Liopleurodon, including skulls and much of the postcranial skeleton. Charles William Andrews described the anatomy of the marine reptile specimens of the Leeds Collection acquired by the British Museum of Natural History in two volumes, the first published in 1910 and the second in 1913. He described the Liopleurodon specimens in the second volume, though considered them to belong to Pliosaurus.

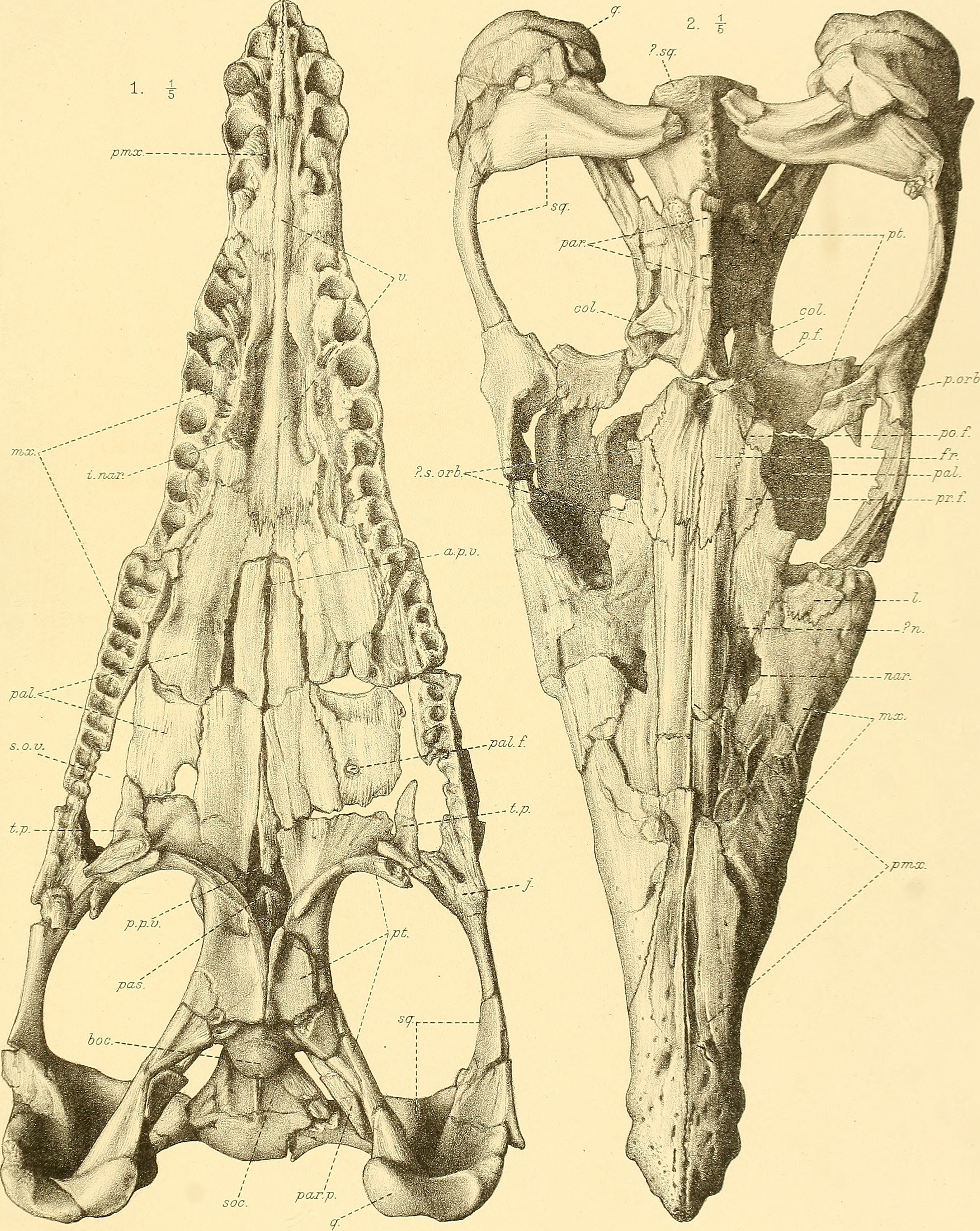
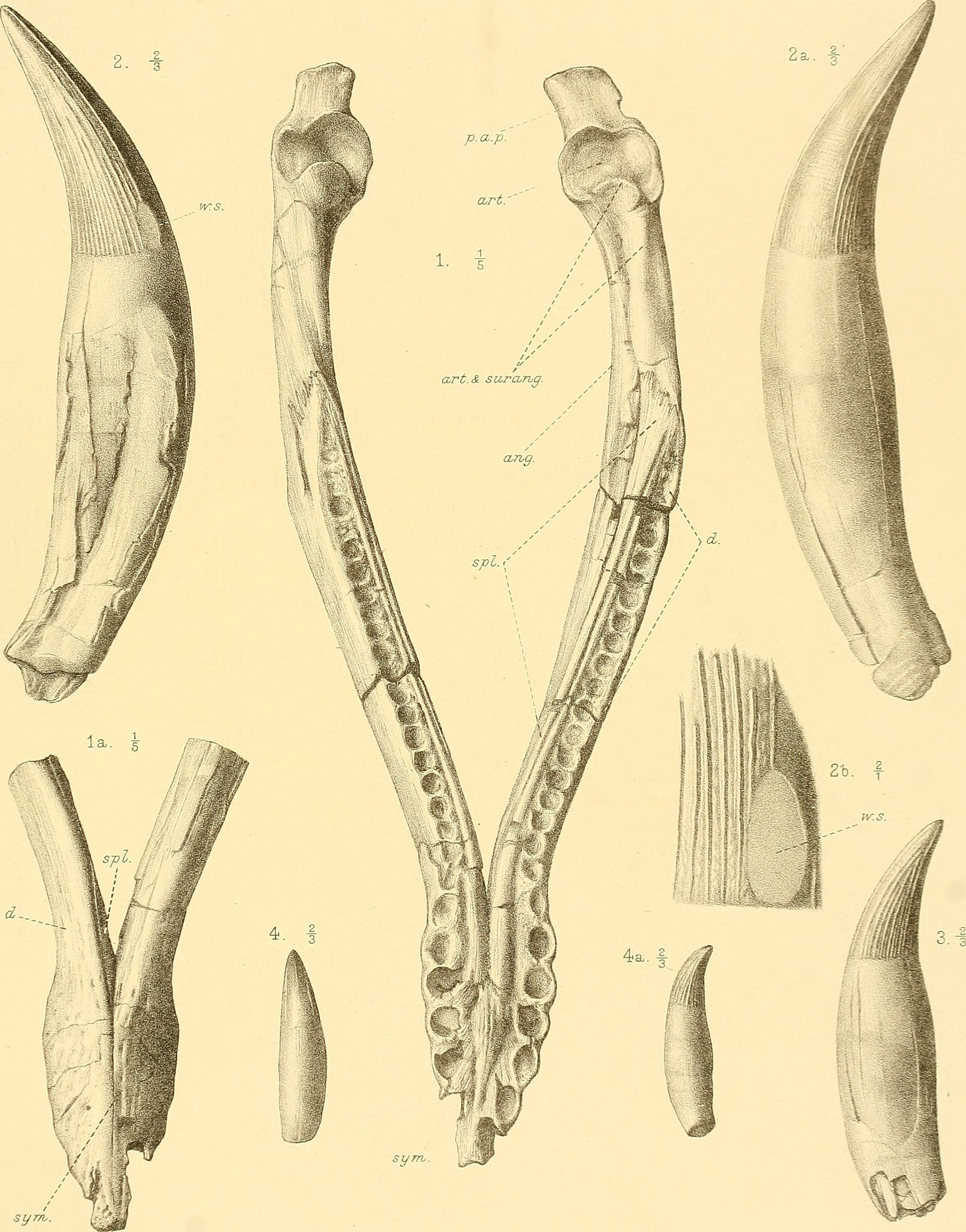
1913 Illustrations showing from various angles the skull, mandible, and teeth of specimen NHMUK PV R2680.

Hermann Linder also described specimens of Liopleurodon ferox in 1913. One of these was a poorly preserved partial skeleton excavated from the Oxford Clay of Fletton, England, housed in Institut für Geowissenschaften, University of Tübingen. The skeleton was mounted and missing regions were restored with material from other Liopleurodon specimens. Like Andrews, Linder also considered L. ferox to be a species of Pliosaurus. Additionally, Linder described some skulls from Fletton housed at both the University of Tübingen and the State Museum of Natural History Stuttgart as specimens of Pliosaurus grandis. Linder also assigned a nearly complete paddle to Pliosaurus sp. All of these specimens have since been assigned to Liopleurodon with varying degrees of confidence, though the skull Linder attributed to Pliosaurus grandis that was housed in Stuttgart was destroyed during World War II. In 1934, Friedrich von Huene described a partial skeleton from Swabia, Germany, in the Ornatenton Formation. As Linder, he also used the name Pliosaurus ferox instead of Liopleurodon ferox. In 1938, Alexandre Bigot used Pliosaurus ferox as well, assigning some teeth known from Calvados, in the north of France.

Lambert Beverly Halstead, then known as Tarlo, published a review of Upper Jurassic pliosaurid taxonomy in 1960. He considered Liopleurodon to be distinct from Pliosaurus, noting major differences between the mandibles of the two genera. In addition to the type species L. ferox, Tarlo also considered Pliosaurus pachydeirus to be a valid species within Liopleurodon, L. pachydeirus, noting that the two species had differences in their teeth and cervical vertebrae. L. grossouvrei was not considered valid, though it was tentatively retained for teeth from the Kellaways Formation. In 1971, Halstead published another paper about Jurassic pliosaurids, this time focusing on Pliosaurus rossicus, a species he was formerly unwilling to consider valid, due to a lack of information. After reviewing its anatomy, he considered it valid, though assigned it to Liopleurodon instead, based on its short mandibular symphysis. Halstead also considered Pliosaurus macromerus, which he had previously considered to belong to its own genus, Stretosaurus, to instead be a species of Liopleurodon, despite its irregularly-shaped scapula (although this was later discovered to be an ilium).

In a 2001 dissertation, Leslie F. Noè argued that L. pachydeirus was not diagnostic, and that L. ferox was the only valid species of Liopleurodon. The teeth of mounted skeleton in Tübingen, which Tarlo had attributed to L. pachydeirus, showed distinctive characteristics of L. ferox, indicating that cervical vertebrae are not useful for differentiating species, as argued by David S. Brown in 1981. While Tarlo had considered differences in tooth morphology to be diagnostic, Noè instead considered it to be individual variation. Noè also removed L. macromerus and L. rossicus from the genus, citing differences in tooth shape and mandibular symphysis length. The former species was tentatively placed back in Pliosaurus, while the latter was thought to warrant a new genus.

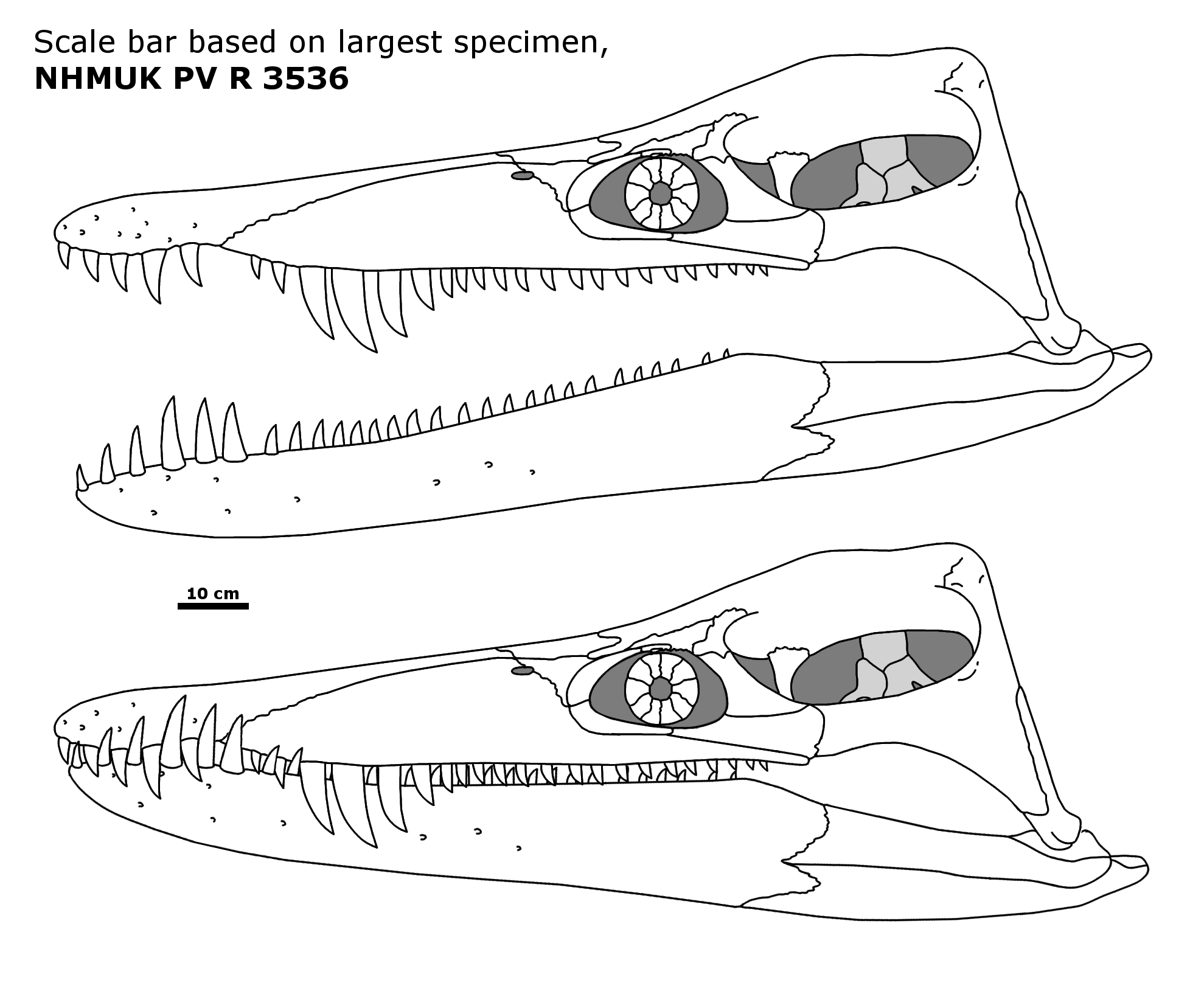
Skull reconstruction of L. ferox. As already shown above, the diagram is based on the specimen NHMUK PV R3536, which may be a possible neotype for the species

Based on Noè's observations, Espen Knutsen reassigned both L. macromerus and L. rossicus to Pliosaurus in his 2012 revision of the genus. The following year, Roger Benson and colleagues agreed with Knutsen's classification, but regarded the species P. macromerus as a nomen dubium due to the absence of a formally designated neotype. In 2015, Jair Israel Barrientos-Lara and colleagues described two pliosaurid fossils found near the town of Tlaxiaco in Oaxaca, Mexico. These fossils were extracted from Kimmeridgian deposits in the Sabinal Formation, and one of them, the partial front end of a snout, was attributable to Liopleurodon, though the researchers considered the remains too fragmentary to provide a species-level identification. L. grossouvrei, although synonymized with "Pliosaurus" andrewsi by most authors, was considered to potentially be a distinct genus in its own right by Davide Foffa and colleagues in 2018, given its differences from "P." andrewsi and Liopleurodon ferox. Madzia and colleagues in 2022 noted that the fact that Liopleurodon was named based on a single tooth of dubious distinctiveness is problematic, and that a more complete neotype may need to be designated to preserve the stability of L. ferox. They also stated that further study of the taxon was needed to confirm that the supposed differences between L. ferox and L. pachydeirus were indeed due to individual variation.

In 2024, Nikolay Zverkov and colleagues documented numerous Callovian marine reptile fossils collected over nearly a century of fieldwork from twenty-eight localities across European Russia. Among this material, they referred three isolated teeth and a partial skeleton to L. ferox. The latter specimen, together with two of the teeth, was discovered in the Unzha River north of Makaryev, whereas the third tooth comes from a quarry in Mikhaylovsky District. Although referred to L. ferox, Zverkov and colleagues says that the femoral anatomy of the partial skeleton differs from that of all known specimens from the Oxford Clay Formation, suggesting that it may represent a distinct species within the genus. The same year, Peggy Vincent and coauthors described a partial postcranial skeleton discovered in 1979 in a since-abandoned quarry in Saint-Laon, France, and also dated from the Callovian. Informally nicknamed as the 'Thouarsais specimen', this fossil reach approximately 3.2 metres (10 ft) in its preserved state. It represents one of the most complete postcranial skeletons of Liopleurodon known to date, as well as the most complete specimen discovered in France.

== Description ==
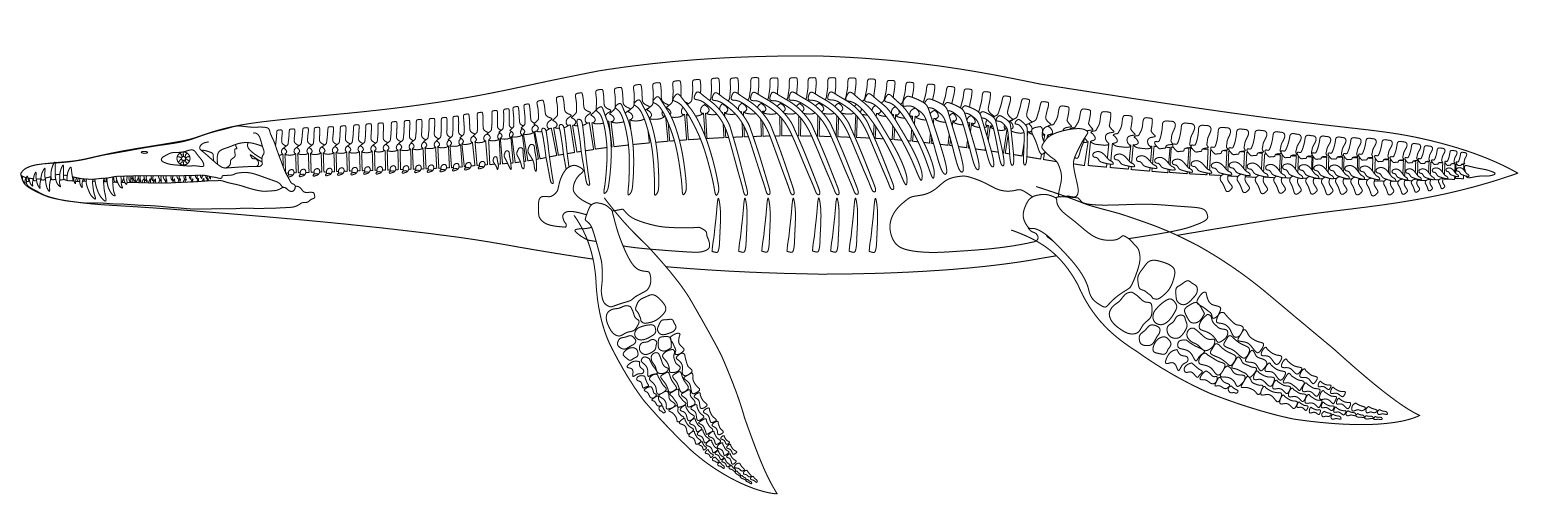
Skeletal diagram of L. ferox

Plesiosaurs typically can be described as being of the small-headed, long-necked "plesiosauromorph" morphotype or the large-headed, short-necked "pliosauromorph" morphotype. Liopleurodon is of the latter morphotype, its skull accounting for nearly one quarter of its total body length. Like all plesiosaurs, it had a short tail, a massive trunk and two pairs of large flippers. As Liopleurodon was named on the basis of a single tooth whose diagnostic value is now regarded as dubious, several authors proposed that a taxonomic revision is needed to preserve its nomenclatural stability. Nevertheless, a number of much more complete specimens referred to the genus have since been described in detail, providing a robust set of diagnostic anatomical characters.

=== Size ===
Size comparison

In his original 1873 description, Sauvage noted that the holotype tooth of L. ferox came from an animal which, according to him, had reached "completely gigantic proportions". Liopleurodon first came to the public attention in 1999 when it was featured in an episode of the BBC television series Walking with Dinosaurs, which depicted it as an enormous apex predator reaching 25 m (82 ft) long for 150 t (330,000 lb). This representation is mainly based on a vertebra discovered from the Oxford Clay near Peterborough and housed in the Peterborough Museum and Art Gallery, with which David M. Martill and Darren Naish, the former of whom then consultant to the series, extrapolated it to a length between 17 and 20 m (56 and 66 ft) and claimed that Liopleurodon and related forms could have reached the size depicted in the series, today recognized as very exaggerated but at the time seen as reliable. Subsequent descriptions deny this claim, including one led by Martill himself, with the remains of very large pliosaurs being often fragmentary and probably not being as imposing as the largest cetaceans. In addition, doubts were expressed by some authors as to the real nature of the Peterborough vertebra, a 2019 study finally re-identified it as actually coming from a sauropod dinosaur.

In 1967, Barney Newman and Tarlo made a skeletal reconstruction of an unnamed pliosaurid based on a large, partially preserved specimen discovered in the Oxford Clay Formation near Stewartby. The reconstructed animal was estimated to measure 10.97 m (36.0 ft) in total length, with a flipper span of 6.4 m (21 ft). In his 2001 doctoral dissertation, Noè suggested that the skull depicted in this reconstruction closely resembles that of the German specimen GPIT-PV-30093, which is still referred to L. ferox and originates from the same geological formation. Eight years later, in 2009, Colin McHenry proposed that the reconstruction was also partly based on another large pliosaurid specimen discovered at Stretham in the Kimmeridge Clay. Because the Stewartby and Stretham specimens were both referred to Liopleurodon by Halstead for a time, together with the specimen discussed by Noè, the 1967 reconstruction became widely used as a representation of Liopleurodon and served as the basis for numerous body size comparisons. However, since the Stewartby specimen is now regarded as an indeterminate pliosaurid and the Stretham specimen has been reassigned to Pliosaurus cf. kevani, this reconstruction can no longer be considered a reliable basis for estimating the body proportions or overall size of L. ferox. In 2026, Edward O. Bartlett, Martill, and Roy E. Smith reassessed the body size of Liopleurodon using only specimens confidently referred to the genus, particularly the most complete ones. Based on body proportions established from the thirty-seven specimens recognized at the time, they estimated a total body length ranging from 2.46 m (8.1 ft) for the smallest known individual to 8.09 m (26.5 ft) for the largest. Remarkably, both extremes are represented solely by isolated teeth discovered in England. According to their estimates, the holotype tooth of L. ferox belonged to an individual measuring approximately 5.24 m (17.2 ft) in total length. Earlier that same year, Ruizhe Jackevan Zhao similarly estimated that a L. ferox specimen measuring 5.8 m (19 ft) in total length would have had a body mass of approximately 1.8 metric tons (2.0 short tons).

== Classification ==
When Sauvage established the genus Liopleurodon in 1873, he did not assign it to any particular group of reptiles. It was not until thirteen years later, in 1880, that he recognized it as a plesiosaur, although he simultaneously synonymized his own genus with Polyptychodon. In 1874, Seeley named a new family of plesiosaurs, Pliosauridae, to contain forms similar to Pliosaurus. Since L. ferox had been referred primarily to the type genus from 1888 onward, it was consequently classified within this group of marine reptiles, an assignment that has been retained ever since. Exactly how pliosaurids are related to other plesiosaurs is uncertain. In 1940, Theodore E. White considered pliosaurids to be close relatives of Elasmosauridae based on shoulder anatomy. However, in 1943, Samuel P. Welles thought that pliosaurids were more similar to Polycotylidae, as they both had large skulls and short necks, among other characteristics. He grouped these two families into the superfamily Pliosauroidea, with other plesiosaurs forming the superfamily Plesiosauroidea. Another plesiosaur family, Rhomaleosauridae, has since been assigned to Pliosauroidea, while Polycotylidae has been reassigned to Plesiosauroidea. However, in 2012, Benson and colleagues recovered a different topology, with Pliosauridae being more closely related to Plesiosauroidea than Rhomaleosauridae. This pliosaurid-plesiosauroid clade was termed Neoplesiosauria.

In 1960, Tarlo considered Liopleurodon to be a close relative of Simolestes, since both taxa had short mandibular symphyses. He also proposed an chronospecific evolutionary scenario for Liopleurodon, in which L. pachydeirus gradually evolved into L. ferox, which in turn gave rise to the genus Stretosaurus. In 2001, Frank Robin O'Keefe recovered Liopleurodon within a clade of pliosaurids that also included Pliosaurus and Brachauchenius. However, in 2008, Adam S. Smith and Gareth J. Dyke placed it in a clade comprising Pliosaurus and Peloneustes. In 2013, Benson and Patrick S. Druckenmiller named a new clade within Pliosauridae, Thalassophonea. This clade included the "classic", short-necked pliosaurids while excluding the earlier, long-necked, more gracile forms. Liopleurodon was found to be in an intermediate position between Simolestes and a clade containing Pliosaurus and the Brachaucheninae. Subsequent studies have uncovered a similar position for Liopleurodon.

The following cladogram follows Ketchum and Benson, 2022:

- - Marmornectes candrewi
  - - Thalassophonea
      - Peloneustes philarchus
      - - Eardasaurus powelli
        - - "Pliosaurus" andrewsi
          - - Simolestes vorax
            - - Liopleurodon ferox
              - - Pliosaurus spp.
                - Brachaucheninae

== Palaeobiology ==
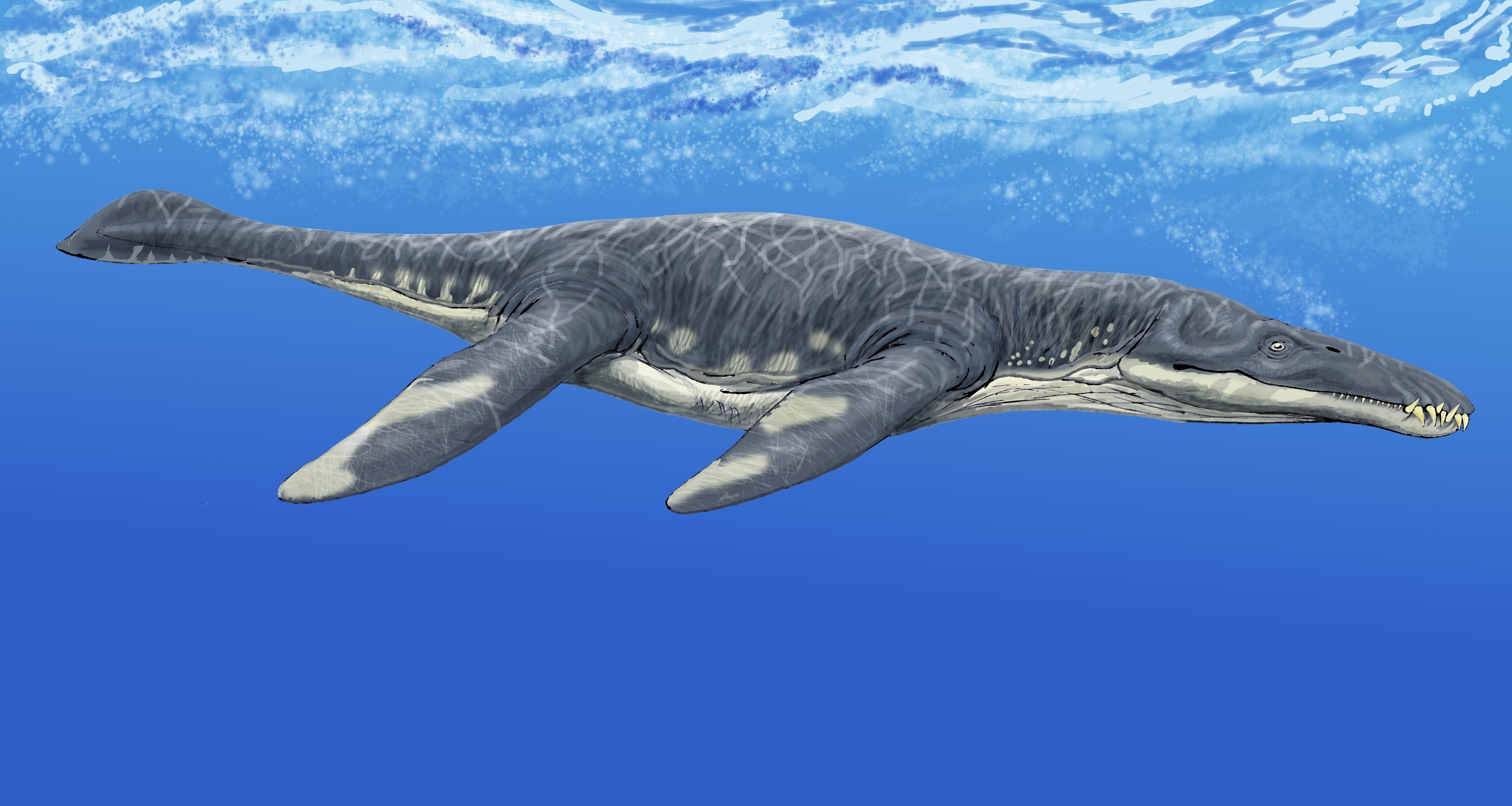
Life restoration of L. ferox based after the skeletal diagram by Newman & Tarlo (1967)

Four strong paddle-like limbs suggest that Liopleurodon was a powerful swimmer. Its four-flipper mode of propulsion is characteristic of all plesiosaurs. A study involving a swimming robot has demonstrated that although this form of propulsion is not especially efficient, it provides very good acceleration—a desirable trait in an ambush predator. Studies of the skull have shown that it could probably scan the water with its nostrils to ascertain the source of certain smells.

Currently, there are only two known examples of a Liopleurodon preserved with stomach contents. The first is a partial skeleton of a young individual from the Oxford Clay Formation, discovered in 1990 in a since-abandoned quarry in the Dogsthorpe district of Peterborough and described two years later by Martill. Owing to its poor state of preservation, Martill referred the specimen to cf. Liopleurodon sp., its specific identity being not determined with confidence. The abdominal region preserves at least seven gastroliths, numerous teuthoid cephalopods hooklets, fish bones, and a single tooth that most likely belonged to a reptile. The second specimen is the partial skeleton from Makaryev, which is associated with an anterior dorsal vertebra of a small-bodied taxon such Picrocleidus or Tricleidus. This vertebra has been interpreted as possible stomach contents.

When Martill described the Dogsthorpe specimen in 1992, he concluded that the available evidence did not allow the dietary preferences of Liopleurodon to be determined with certainty. Nevertheless, he proposed three possible feeding strategies to explain the preserved stomach contents. One possibility is that Liopleurodon could have fed on food supplies that are abundant (i.e. squids), but considering that plesiosaurs and ichthyosaurs were also abundant and that the plesiosaurs' swimming speed is likely very slow compared to squids, this interpretation may be unlikely unless Liopleurodon was an ambush predator. Another possibility is that Liopleurodon may have been an opportunistic feeder, with cephalopod hooklets being representative of the acid resistant residue of its varied diet—skeletal components of various vertebrates that lost to the acid environment of the gut; however, since the thin sections through the gut don't reveal the presence of otoliths (calcium carbonate structure of vertebrates located in the vestibular labyrinth) which are known to occur in the gut of cetaceans, fish may not have been an important part of its diet. The other possibility is that the pliosaur fed on large cephalopod-feeders, with the hooklets representing the residues of the stomach contents of the pliosaur's prey, but there is no firm evidence to this claim. The excellent preservation of the cephalopod hooklets indicates that the gastroliths were probably not used for grinding food. It is therefore possible that the pliosaur swallowed them accidentally and that they remained in its stomach, or alternatively that they represent the acid-resistant residue of carbonate-cemented sandstone.

== Paleoecology ==
=== Europe ===
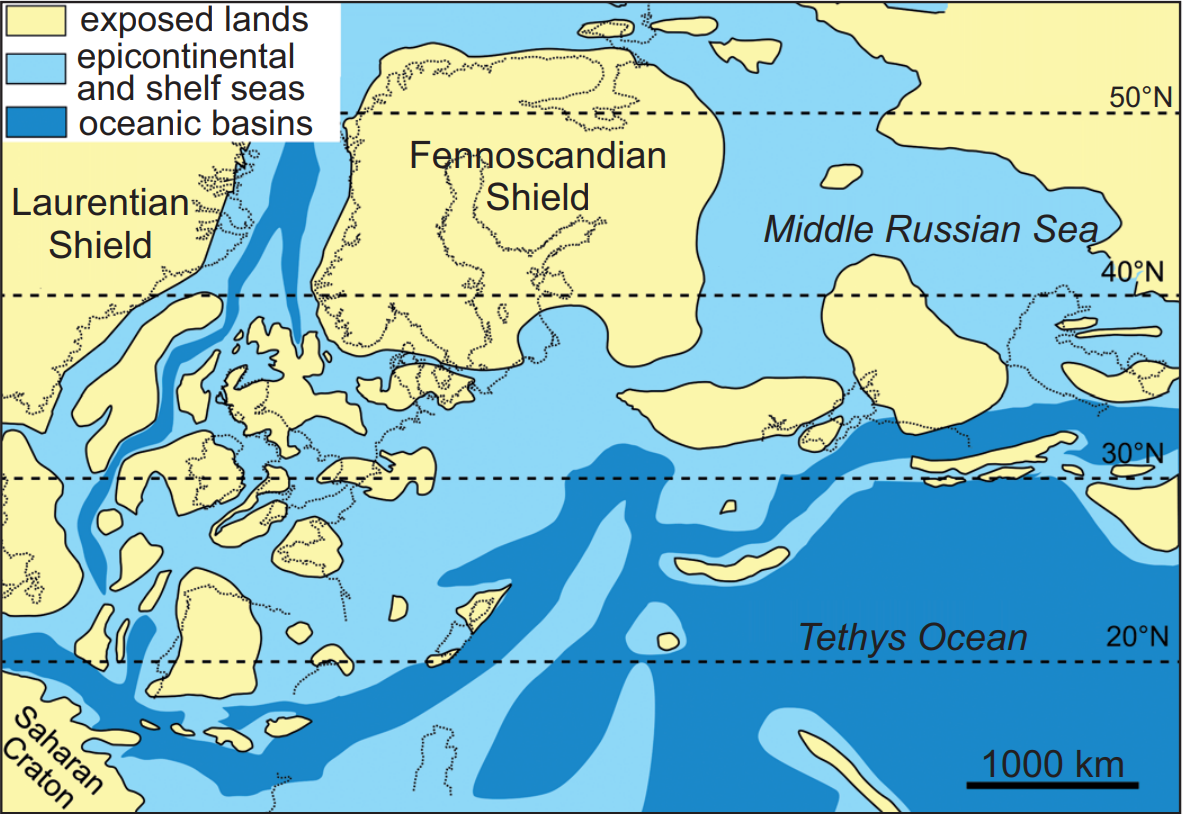
Paleogeographic map of Europe during the late Callovian, when Liopleurodon lived

Fossils attributed to Liopleurodon are primarily known from deposits dated to the Callovian stage of the Middle Jurassic in present-day Germany, England, France, and Russia. The oldest known occurrence of the genus is an isolated tooth crown discovered in a quarry near the German city of Hildesheim, dating to approximately 164.5 million years ago, i. e. lower Callovian. The youngest known European occurrence corresponds to the French holotype, recovered from upper Callovian strata dated to about 161.5 million years ago. This specimen is therefore approximately one million years younger than the numerous fossils recovered from the Peterborough Member of the Oxford Clay Formation in England, from which Liopleurodon is chiefly known.

All of these localities represent deposits of a vast epicontinental sea that developed during a major marine transgression. At that time, a eustatic rise in sea level connected the Boreal Sea, the Western European Sea, and the Central Russian Sea with the Tethys Ocean through a network of straits winding between the islands of the European archipelago. This epicontinental sea reached depths of up to approximately 100 metres (330 ft) in some areas. The climate was warm and humid, with average sea-surface temperatures estimated at around 21 °C, based on aragonite precipitation temperatures derived from the common ammonite Kosmoceras.

== See also ==
- List of plesiosaur genera
- Timeline of plesiosaur research
