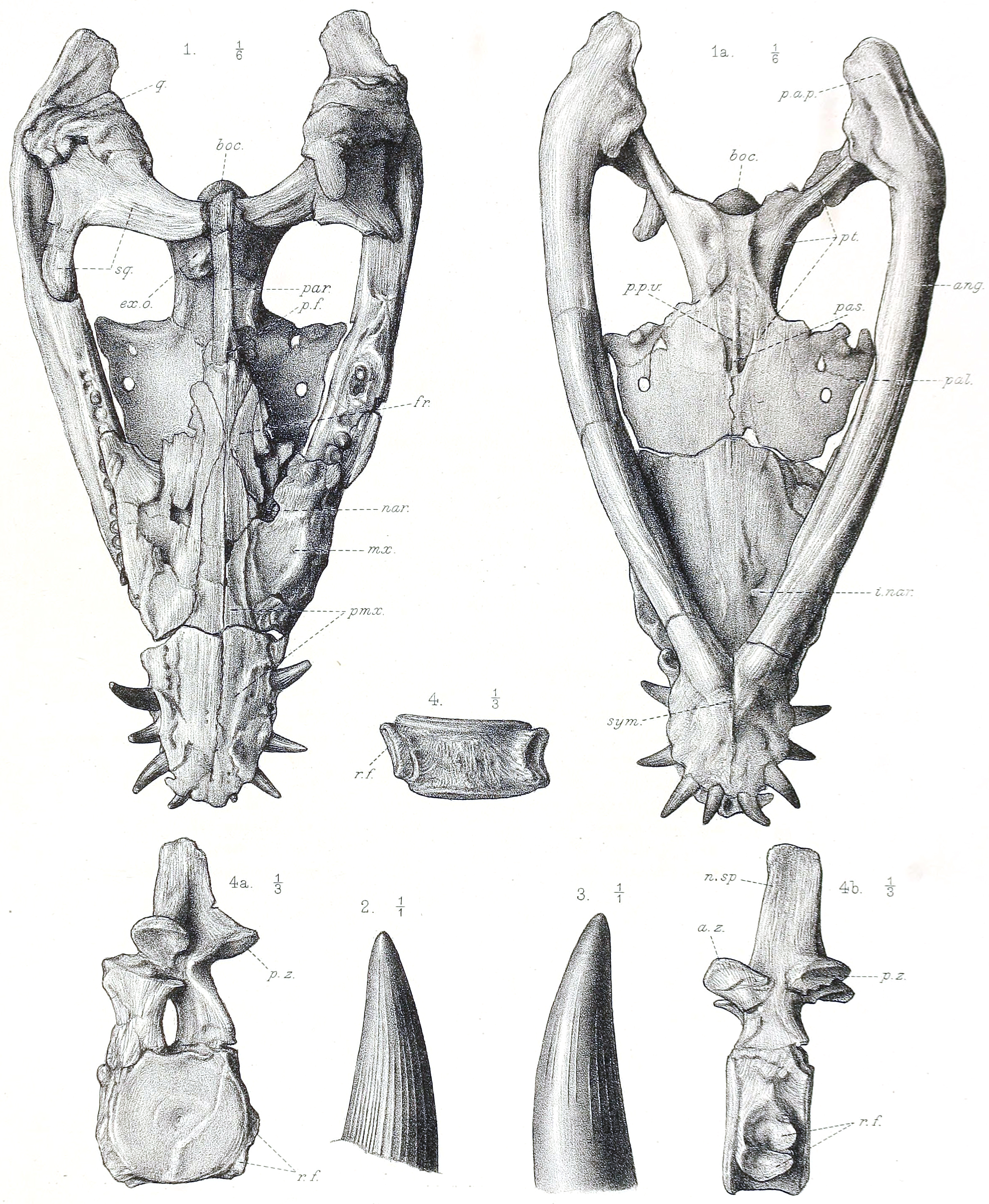
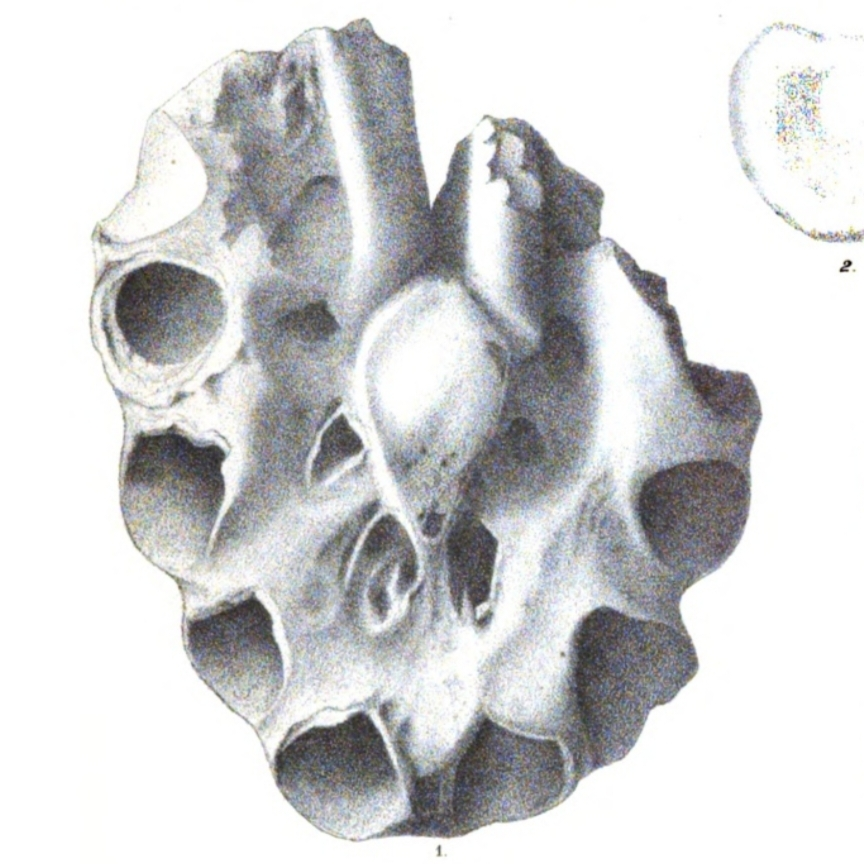
- Illustrations of the skull elements of Simolestes, Left is the S. vorax skull and Right is the mandibular symphysis of S. indicus.

Scientific classification
- Kingdom: Animalia
- Phylum: Chordata
- Class: Reptilia
- Superorder: †Sauropterygia
- Order: †Plesiosauria
- Suborder: †Pliosauroidea
- Family: †Pliosauridae
- Clade: †Thalassophonea
- Genus: †Simolestes; Andrews, 1909

Species
- †S. vorax (type); †S. indicus (?)

Synonyms
- Eurysaurus raincourti? Gaudry, 1878

= Simolestes =

Simolestes Temporal range: 171.6–145.5 Ma Middle–Late Jurassic

Extinct genus of reptiles

Simolestes (meaning "snub-nosed thief") is an extinct pliosaurid genus that lived in the Middle to Late Jurassic. The type specimen, NHMUK PV R 3319 is an almost complete but crushed skeleton diagnostic to Simolestes vorax, dating back to the Callovian of the Oxford Clay formation, England. The genus might also be known from the Tithonian Bhuj Formation of India (S. indicus), but the referral of this species to Simolestes is dubious. S. keileni from France was moved to the new genus Lorrainosaurus in 2023.

== Description ==
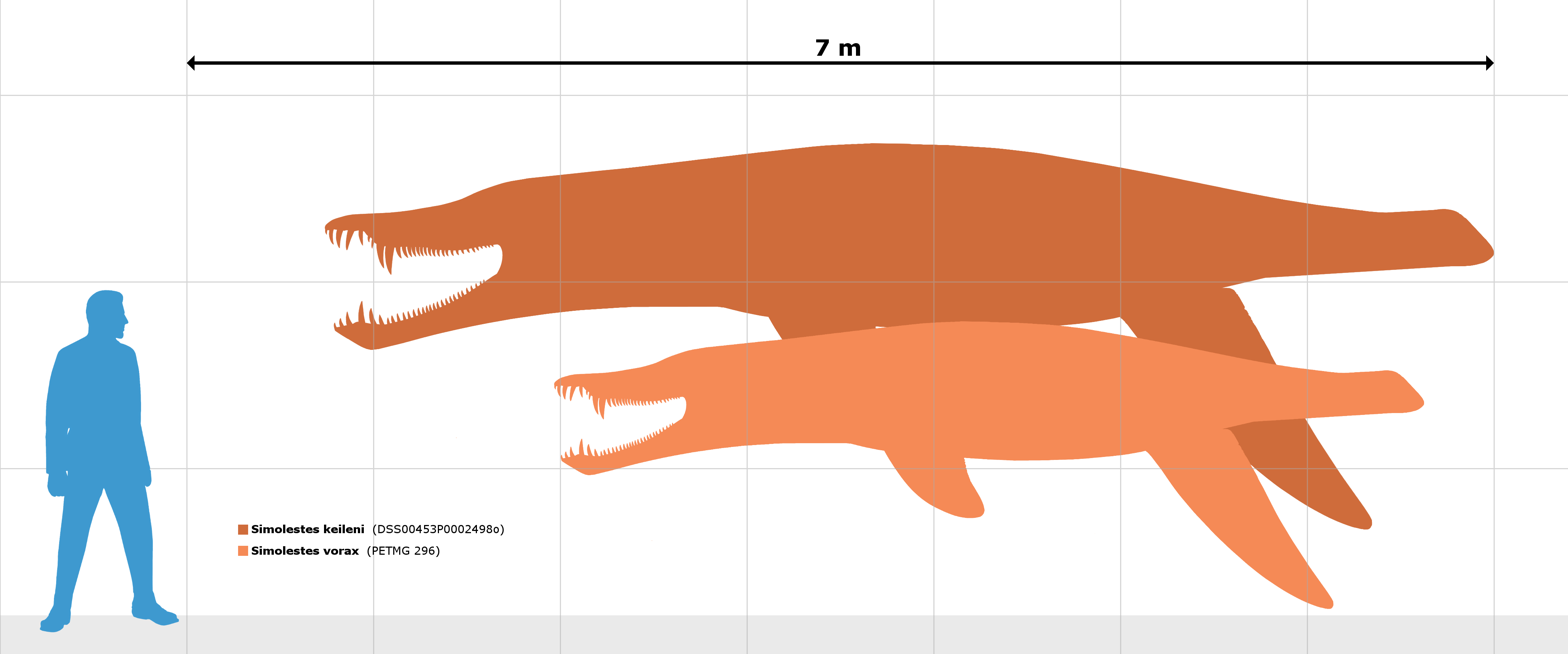
Scale diagram, presenting the largest specimens of Simolestes and Lorrainosaurus (here as a species of the former genus)

Simolestes possessed a short, high, and wide skull which was built to resist torsional forces when hunting.

The largest specimens of S. vorax reached approximately 4.6 metres (15 ft) in length, if a head to body ratio similar to Liopleurodon is applied.

== Palaeobiology ==
Like most pliosaurs, Simolestes possessed salt secreting glands, which would have enabled the animal to maintain salt balance and drink seawater. Recent studies on plesiosaur locomotion indicate that Simolestes, like other plesiosaurs, possessed a unique bauplan for movement, which differs from modern organisms in similar niches.

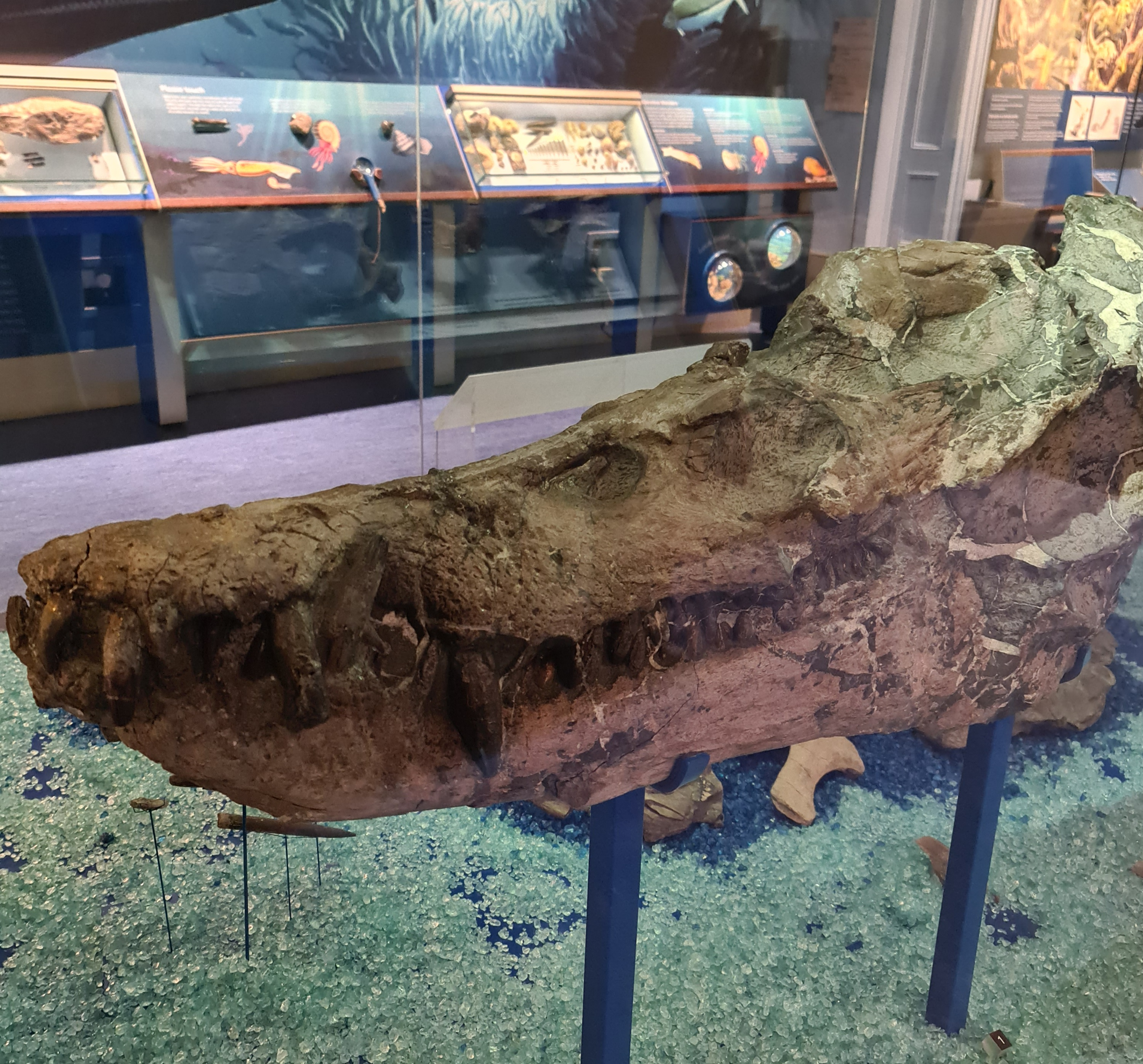
Skull specimen housed at the Peterborough Museum.

=== Feeding habits ===
Simolestes's exact feeding habits are unclear. The current consensus, however, is that the genus was primarily teuthophagous, consuming belemnites, soft teuthoids and ammonites. It is possible Simolestes was also ecologically separated from other contemporary pliosaur genera such as Liopleurodon and Pachycostasaurus by hunting in deeper waters or at night, as modern cephalopods exhibit diurnal feeding cycles, spending daylight in deeper, safer waters, and rising at night to feed.

== Classification ==
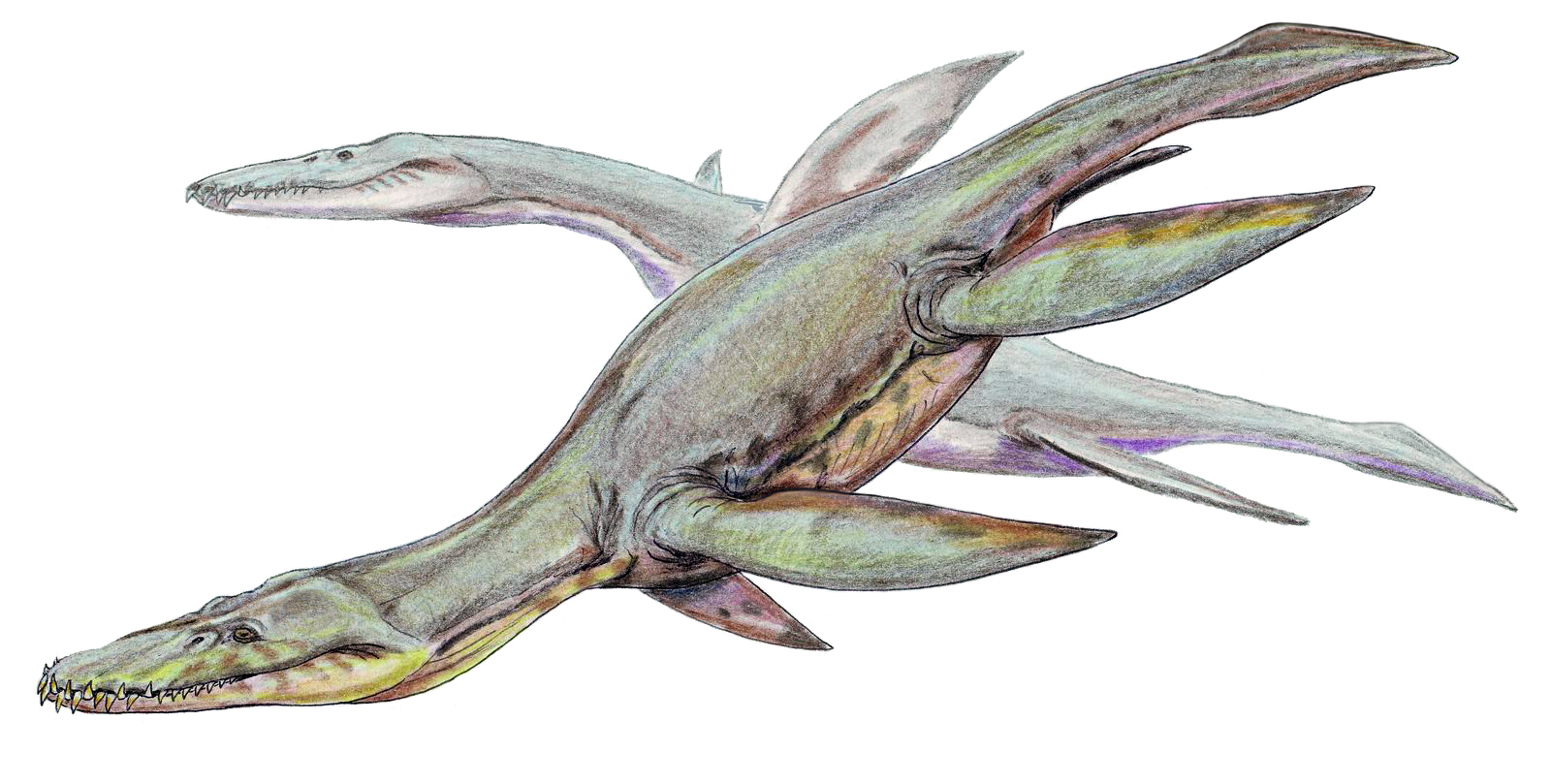
Restoration of S. vorax

The cladogram below follows a 2011 analysis by paleontologists Hilary F. Ketchum and Roger B. J. Benson, and reduced to genera only.

- Pliosauroidea
  - Rhomaleosauridae
    - Anningasaura
    - - - "Plesiosaurus" macrocephalus
        - - Archaeonectrus
          - Macroplata
      - - Atychodracon
        - - Eurycleidus
          - - Rhomaleosaurus
            - - Meyerasaurus
              - Maresaurus
  - Pliosauridae
    - Thalassiodracon
    - - Hauffiosaurus
      - - Attenborosaurus
        - - - NHMUK PV R 2439
            - Marmornectes
          - - "Pliosaurus" andrewsi
            - - - OUMNH J.02247
                - Peloneustes
              - - Simolestes
                - - Liopleurodon
                  - - Pliosaurus
                    - - Megacephalosaurus
                      - - Brachauchenius
                        - Kronosaurus
