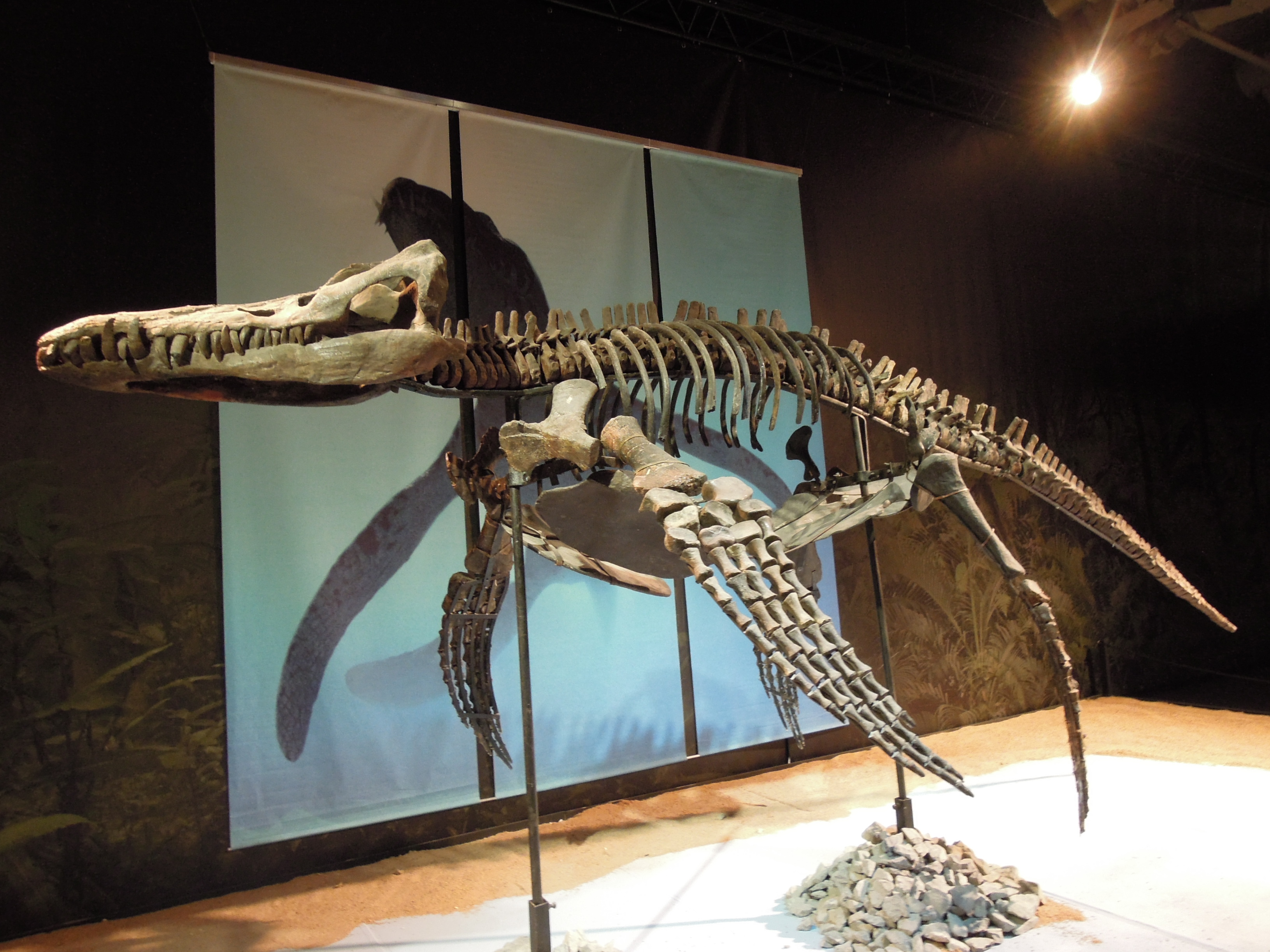
- Skeletal mount of a P. rossicus exhibited in Dinosaurium, Prague

Scientific classification
- Kingdom: Animalia
- Phylum: Chordata
- Class: Reptilia
- Superorder: †Sauropterygia
- Order: †Plesiosauria
- Suborder: †Pliosauroidea
- Family: †Pliosauridae
- Clade: †Thalassophonea
- Genus: †Pliosaurus; Owen, 1841

Type species
- †Plesiosaurus brachydeirus Owen, 1841

Other species
- List: Recognised species; †P. rossicus Novozhilov, 1948; †P. funkei Knutsen et al., 2012; †P. kevani Benson et al., 2013; †P. westburyensis Benson et al., 2013; †P. carpenteri Benson et al., 2013 Disputed species; †P. patagonicus Gasparini & O'Gorman, 2014; †P. almanzaensis O'Gorman et al., 2018

Synonyms
- List of synonyms: Synonyms of genus; Pleiosaurus Owen, 1841; Stretosaurus Tarlo, 1959; Spondylosaurus Fischer, 1845; Strongylokrotaphus Novozhilov, 1964 Synonyms of P. brachydeirus; Plesiosaurus giganteus Conybeare, 1824; Plesiosaurus (Pleiosaurus) brachydeirus Owen, 1841; Pleiosaurus brachydeirus Phillips, 1871; Pliosaurus brachydirus Lydekker, 1889 Synonyms of P. rossicus; Pliosaurus irgisensis ? Novozhilov, 1948; Strongylokrotaphus irgisensis ? Novozhilov, 1964; Liopleurodon rossicus Tarlo, 1971

= Pliosaurus =

Pliosaurus Temporal range: Late Jurassic to Lower Cretaceous (Kimmeridgian to Valanginian), 154–137 Ma Possible Oxfordian record

Extinct genus of marine reptiles

Pliosaurus is the type genus (defining example) of the pliosaurs, one of the major group of the plesiosaurs, an extinct group of aquatic marine reptiles. It lived from the Upper Jurassic to the Lower Cretaceous in what is now Europe and South America. The first known fossil consists of a partial skeleton of an immature specimen collected by William Buckland in Market Rasen, England. Although initially mentioned in a 1824 paper by William Daniel Conybeare, it was not until 1841 that it was first formally described by Richard Owen as belonging to a new species of Plesiosaurus, before being given its own genus by the same author later that year. The genus name Pliosaurus means "more lizard", Owen naming the taxon of because its appearance being more reminiscent of crocodilians than to Plesiosaurus. While many species have been assigned to Pliosaurus in the past, only six are firmly recognised as valid since a 2013 paper. Two additional species from Argentina were named in 2014 and 2018, but their assignment to the genus has not been fully confirmed in subsequent classifications.

The largest species, P. funkei and P. kevani, are among the largest pliosaurs ever discovered, with maximum sizes estimated at around 10 metres (33 ft) long and weighing nearly 11 tonnes (12 short tons). Even before both species were described in the scientific literature, their imposing size led some scientists to assign them various nicknames, the most famous being "Predator X", used to refer to the second known specimen of P. funkei. However, a large specimen composed entirely of cervical vertebrae discovered in Abingdon and putatively assigned to the genus could have reached a length exceeding 11 metres (36 ft). The elongated skull of Pliosaurus is robust, and those of the largest known species exceed 2 metres (6.6 ft) in length. The teeth are also robust and are trihedral in cross-section, which is one of the main diagnostic traits of the genus. The neck is one of the most recognizable features of the taxon, being relatively short compared to other plesiosaurs, having only 18 cervical vertebrae. The limbs of Pliosaurus were modified into flippers, with the anterior flippers of P. funkei reaching up to 3 metres (9.8 ft) in length.

Phylogenetic classifications place Pliosaurus in a relatively derived position within the Thalassophonea, with the genus often being recovered as related to Gallardosaurus. Like other plesiosaurs, Pliosaurus was well-adapted to aquatic life, using its flippers for a method of swimming known as subaqueous flight. Pliosaurid skulls are reinforced to better withstand the stresses of their feeding. The long, robust snouts of the various Pliosaurus species were used to capture large prey, piercing them with the numerous trihedral teeth at the back of the jaws. P. kevani would have achieved a bite force ranging from 9,600 to 48,000 newtons (2,160 to 10,790 lbf) depending on the area of the jaws. The rostrum of some species contains internal structures that likely housed a neurovascular system capable of detecting the movements of nearby prey in the water. The fossil record shows that Pliosaurus shared its habitat with a variety of other animals, including invertebrates, fish, thalattosuchians, ichthyosaurs, and other plesiosaurs, which would undoubtedly have constituted prey for the larger species.

== Research history ==
=== Discovery and identification ===
In 1824, William Daniel Conybeare established a new species of the genus Plesiosaurus, Plesiosaurus giganteus, to include all plesiosaurian specimens with shortened cervical vertebrae. Among the specimens that were classified in this taxon was a partial skeleton discovered in Market Rasen, Lincolnshire, England, collected by William Buckland. This specimen has since been stored in the Oxford University Museum of Natural History, where it has since been catalogued as OUMNH J.9245. Other fossils associated with this same individual are also stored in the museum, but their records tend to vary depending on the studies describing them since. Together it consists of teeth, a mandible, upper jaw, a partial spinal column, a femur, a tibia, and a fibula. Its ontogenetic stage is unknown, but the incomplete ossification of the proximal convexity of the tibia suggests that it is a juvenile or subadult specimen. In his article, Conybeare only refers specimens to this species, designating no type specimens and giving no detailed anatomical descriptions. As the referred specimens were then insufficiently characterized, the name Plesiosaurus giganteus was generally perceived as invalid in subsequent works, having since become a nomen oblitum.

In 1841, Richard Owen described the anatomy of the jaws of the Market Rasen specimen. Based on several distinctive features, he decided to make it the holotype of a subgenus accompanying a new species of Plesiosaurus, which he named Plesiosaurus (Pleiosaurus) brachydeirus. The name Pleiosaurus comes from the Ancient Greek πλειων (pleion, "more"), and σαῦρος (saûros, "lizard"), Owen named it this way because the appearance of the specimen described is closer to those of crocodilians than to those of other species then attributed to Plesiosaurus. The specific name brachydeirus also comes from Ancient Greek and comes from the words βραχύς (brakhús, "short"), and δειρή (deirḗ, "neck" or "throat"), in reference to its cervical vertebrae. Later that same year, Owen described the postcranial parts of the skeleton and relegated this taxon to a separate genus, but spelling it as Pliosaurus. In 1869, the same author erroneously claimed that another species formerly attributed to Pliosaurus, P. grandis, would be the type species of this genus. In 1871, John Phillips corrected most of Owen's taxonomic errors, recognizing P. brachydeirus as the type species and using the original spelling Pleiosaurus. Furthermore, the holotypic material of P. grandis is considered by many authors to be non-diagnostic and cannot be proven to belong to the genus. However, despite Phillips's requirement, the genus name Pliosaurus has since entered into universal usage and must be maintained according to the rule of article 33.3.1 of the ICZN. Currently, only the holotype and the fossils attributed to it constitute the only known specimen of this species.

=== Later discoveries and other species ===
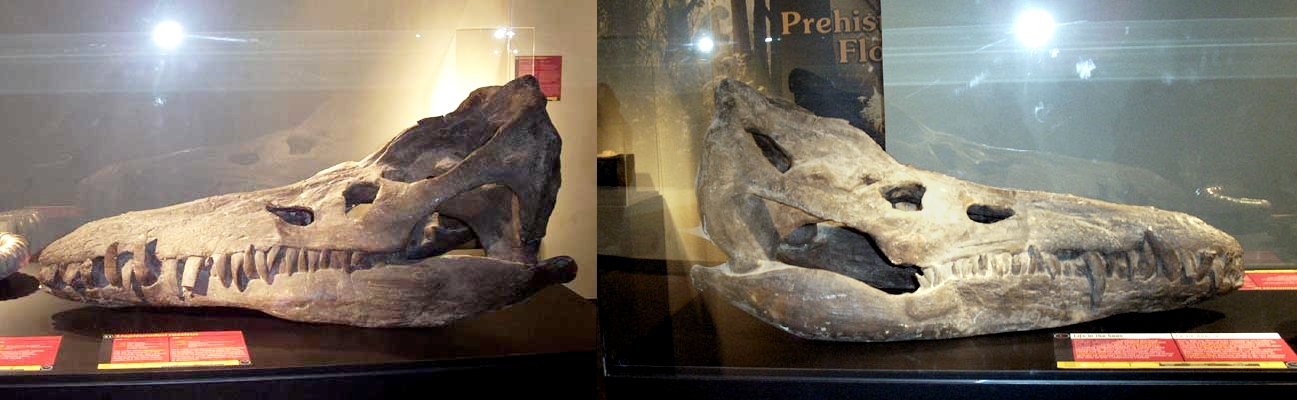
View in two sides of the holotype skull of P. rossicus (PIN 304/1)

In 1948, Nestor Novozhilov named the species P. rossicus on the basis of two more or less partial specimens discovered in two mines in the Lower Volga Basin in Russia (hence the name), and which have since been housed in the paleontological collections of the country's scientific academy. The holotype consists of a skull and postcranial remains from a relatively small specimen, since catalogued as PIN 304/1. This same specimen, which was originally a complete skeleton, was largely destroyed ten years earlier due to the exploitation of the oil shale from which it was discovered. However, pectoral elements associated with the latter are described by the same author in 1964. Based on its small size and poorly developed anatomical elements on the scapula, the holotype is interpreted as a juvenile. The second specimen, more imposing and since catalogued as PIN 2440/1, was discovered in May 1945 as a complete skeleton, but like the holotype, it was largely destroyed by mining operations. The only surviving remains of the latter are a rostrum, a proximal part of a humerus, a phalanx, and ribs fragments, which were originally described in 1947 as coming from a P. grandis by Anatoly Rozhdestvensky. In 1971, Beverly Halstead reclassified this species in the genus Liopleurodon because of its short mandibular symphysis (where the two halves of the lower jaw connect), and assigned the second specimen a complete hindlimb. However, it later turned out that this hindlimb actually originates from the holotype of the contemporary species P. irgisensis, which has since been recognised as a dubious. (Note: Initially named Peloneustes irgisensis by Novozhilov in the same publication in which he described P. rossicus, the taxon is based on a single specimen (PIN 426) from the same locality, consisting of a partial skeleton that includes a large but incomplete skull, vertebrae, a partial hindlimb, and preserved stomach contents. In 1960, Halstead (then called Tarlo) considered the species too distinct to belong to Peloneustes and provisionally placed it in Pliosaurus, suggesting that Novozhilov may have been mistaken in believing it to be the only long-snouted pliosaurid. Four years later, in 1964, Novozhilov erected the genus Strongylokrotaphus, but subsequent studies, agreeing with Halstead’s assessment, reassigned the species to Pliosaurus, with some even suggesting it may represent a junior synonym of P. rossicus. More recent research has regarded the taxon as a nomen dubium due to the non-diagnostic nature of the holotype, while nevertheless recommending a redescription of the material. However, this suggestion risks being tainted by the current state of conservation of the specimen, the skull and notably the mandible having since been seriously damaged by pyrite decay, and the associated elements being noted as lost.) Although Halstead's classification was long recognised as valid, it was questioned in a 2001 thesis by Leslie F. Noè, who noted that, due to the shape of the teeth and the length of the mandibular symphysis, the species might represent a new genus. In a revision published in 2012, Espen M. Knutsen nevertheless reassigned the species to its original genus on the basis of diagnostic features shared with other lineages within the genus.

The species P. funkei was described in 2012 by Knutsen and colleagues based on two large specimens discovered in the Norwegian archipelago of Svalbard. The holotype, catalogued as PMO 214.135, consists of a partial skeleton preserving the anterior part of the jaws with teeth, various more or less preserved vertebrae, a complete right coracoid, a nearly complete right flipper, as well as ribs and gastralia (abdominal ribs). The larger referred specimen, catalogued as PMO 214.136, includes a partial skull preserving mostly its left posterior part, a few vertebrae and several unidentifiable fragmentary bones. Based on various morphological and histological characteristics, particularly in terms of increased bone density, these two specimens appear to have been adults. The fossils were collected at 2 km (1.25 mi) intervals during eight seasons of fieldwork conducted from 2004 to 2012 by Jørn Hurum in the southern Sassenfjorden. More precisely, they were discovered in 2006, excavated over the following two years, and officially reported at a Society of Vertebrate Paleontology conference in 2009, where their affinity with the genus Pliosaurus was already noted. Due to the Arctic climate of Svalbard, the specimens were subjected to repeated freeze-thaw cycles before collection, extensively fracturing and degrading the material. The specific name honours Bjørn Funke, the discoverer of the holotype, and his wife May-Liss Knudsen Funke, for their years of voluntary service to the paleontological collections of the University of Oslo Natural History Museum, where the specimens have since been housed. In their article, Knutsen and colleagues conclude that it cannot be definitively excluded that P. funkei and P. rossicus would represent different ontogenetic stages of the same species based on the available material. Nevertheless, the two taxa are still maintained as distinct on the basis that their respective holotypes exhibit proportionally very different humeral lengths. (Note: This specific distinction is based on the fact that other plesiosaurian taxa such as Leptocleidus have body-to-limb length ratios that are identical in both juveniles and adults within the same species. Since both known specimens of P. funkei are adults and the holotype of P. rossicus is seen as a juvenile, this precise difference is then seen as sufficient to maintain the distinction.) The rather remarkable size of the fossils led the Hurum's paleontological teams to nickname them "The Monster" for the holotype and "Predator X" for the referred specimen, which gave the taxon significant media coverage even before they were firmly described. This popularity led the species to appear in a 2009 documentary broadcast on the American television channel History, then in a 2010 low-budget science fiction horror film.

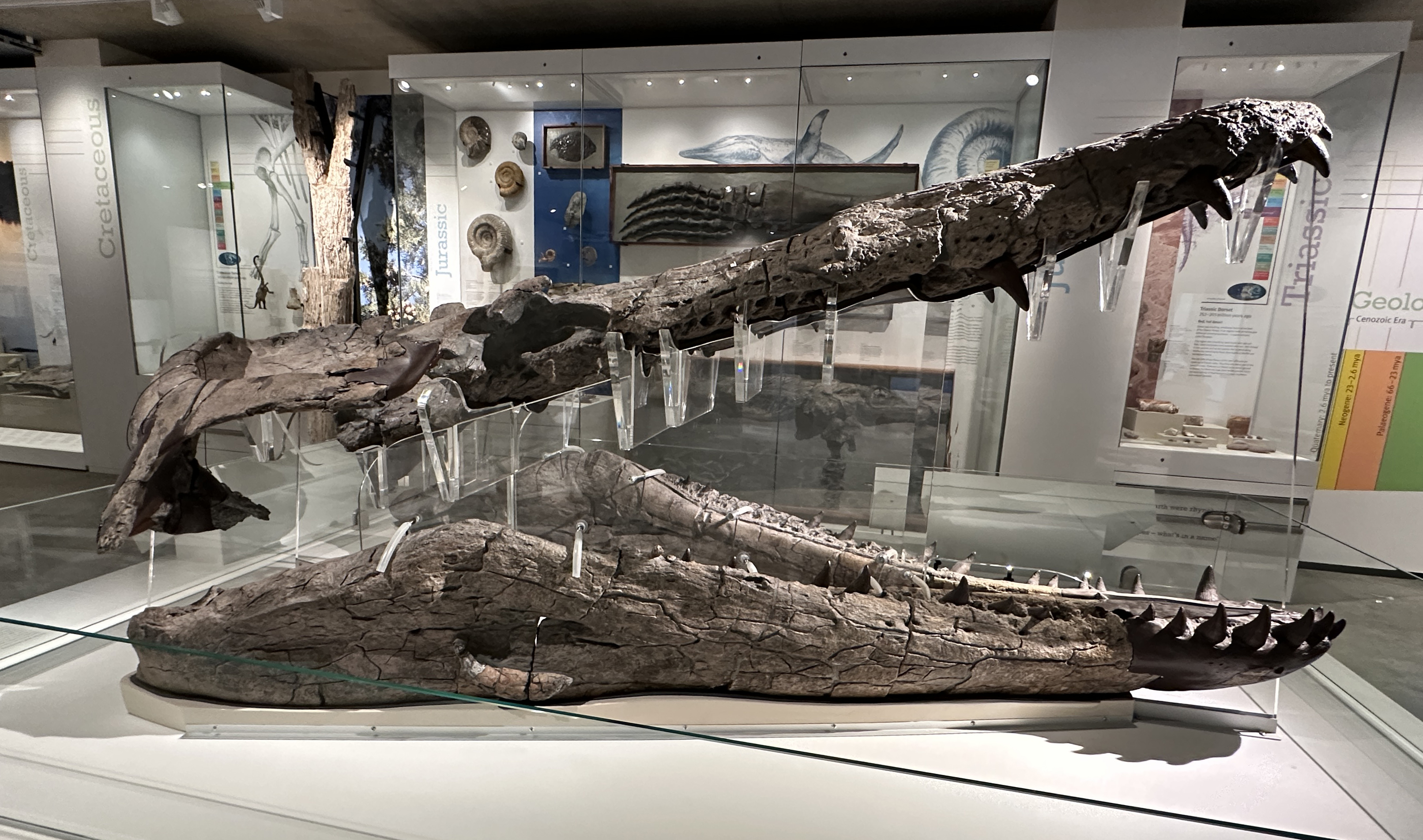
Holotype skull of P. kevani (DORCM G.13,675)

In a 2013 paper published in the mega journal PLOS ONE, Roger B. J. Benson and colleagues described three additional species of Pliosaurus, all of whose fossils were discovered in England. The first of these three species described was P. kevani, whose holotype consists of a large, nearly complete skull of a probable adult, which was discovered in a cliff at Osmington Mills Bay, Dorset. This specimen was collected over a period of eight years via fragmented parts weighing up to 60 kg (130 lb). Most of the fossils comprising the skull were taken without prior permission from loose or fallen boulders, while others were collected locally and purchased from landowners. The specimen was quickly identified as a pliosaurid by geologist Richard Edmonds. The remarkable size and completeness of this specimen, like "The Monster" and "Predator X", gave it widespread media coverage, to the point of earning the nickname "Weymouth Bay pliosaur" before its official description. The Dorset Museum's acquisition of the specimen was publicly announced in 2009, where it has since been catalogued as DORCM G.13,675. However, it was not officially opened by David Attenborough until July 2011. This discrepancy is due in part to the time taken to prepare the fossils, which took 200 hours for the lower jaw and over 365 hours for the rest of the skull. The specific name for this taxon honours Kevan Sheehan, owner of a small cafe overlooking the sea at Osmington Mills, who collected most of the holotype specimen during daily walks along the shore. In addition to the holotype skull, Benson and colleagues tentatively assigned two other large pliosaurid specimens discovered in the Cambridgeshire as P. cf. kevani os the basis of their tooth morphology. The first consists of a large, mostly postcranial skeleton catalogued as CAMSM J.35990, discovered in Stretham, (Note: Discovered in 1952, this specimen was successively studied by Halstead (then called Tarlo), who published several articles about it. Initially, it was assigned in 1958 to P. macromerus, but the morphology of this specimen, particularly of a bone interpreted by the author as a scapula, led Halstead to place the species in its own genus, Stretosaurus, the following year. In subsequent works, however, he reassigned the species to Liopleurodon, citing the short mandibular symphysis of the referred specimens. Since 2004, Stretosaurus has been regarded as a junior synonym of Pliosaurus, based on its tooth morphology. In his 2012 revision, Knutsen not only supported this interpretation but also demonstrated that the bone previously identified as a scapula in the Stretham specimen is in fact an ilium.) while the second is a single tooth catalogued as LEICT G418.1965.108, discovered in Ely, which are stored at the Sedgwick Museum of Earth Sciences and the Leicester Museum & Art Gallery respectively.

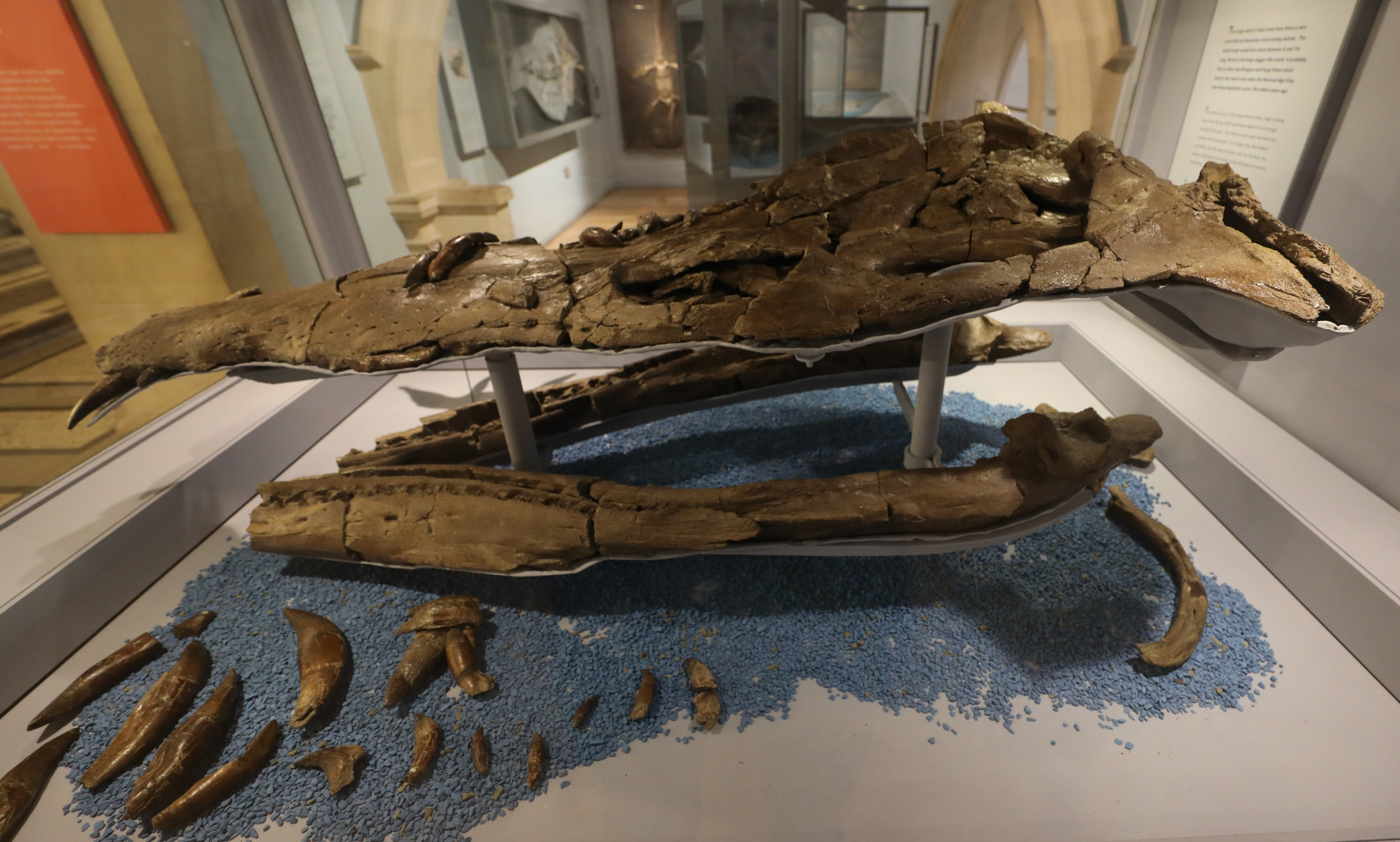
Holotype skull of P. westburyensis (BRSMG Cc332).

The other two species described in the 2013 paper are P. westburyensis and P. carpenteri, both of whose holotypes were discovered in a quarry near Westbury, Wiltshire, and were subsequently donated to the Bristol Museum & Art Gallery, where they have since been catalogued as BRSMG Cc332 and BRSMG Cc6172, respectively. The holotype of the first species consists of a skull with some postcranial remains, while the second consists of a partial skeleton, respectively discovered on July 2, 1980, and May 12, 1994. Informally dubbed as the "first Westbury pliosaur", BRSMG Cc332 was first described in a 1993 paper by Michael A. Taylor and Arthur Cruickshank, in which they identified it as a specimen of P. brachyspondylus. The first anatomical description of BRSMG Cc6172 was not carried out until much later, by Judyth Sassoon and colleagues in 2012, although some historical details relating to its excavation had already been published in earlier works. In their publication, these two specimens are both classified in Pliosaurus, although without a species assignment, a point of view also followed in the genus revision conducted by Knutsen in the same year. Based on their morphological differences and their close stratigraphic levels within the same quarry, Sassoon and colleagues described these specimens as exhibiting intraspecific variation, and possibly sexual dimorphism within the same species, interpreting BRSMG Cc332 as a young male and BRSMG Cc6172 as an old female. However, in the article published the following year, Benson and his colleagues consider that the differences between them are relatively significant when observed in the context of specimens from other localities, and therefore justify a specific distinction. The specific name of the first cited species refers to the town of Westbury, while that of the second honours Simon Carpenter, discoverer of the holotype of the latter species. From June 2017 to February 2018, the holotype specimen of P. carpenteri, then nicknamed "Doris", was temporarily mounted as part of a special exhibition at Bristol Museum & Art Gallery.

The South American species P. patagonicus and P. almanzaensis were described in 2014 and 2018, respectively, from fossils discovered in different localities of Neuquén Province, Argentina. The holotype of P. patagonicus consists of a partial skull discovered in 1975 by Zulma Gasparini and a team from the La Plata Museum, in the Zapala Department. The specimen, since catalogued as MLP 80-V-29-1 within the museum, was prepared using acid, a technique frequently employed at the time, but its application was incorrect. Although the mandible had been partially well exposed, the palate and the other cranial bones, originally crushed dorsoventrally, were so damaged that they became difficult to identify. As a result, the taxonomic identity of the specimen remained uncertain for more than three decades. Thus, in works led by Gasparini, the specimen was first assigned to Stretosaurus sp. from 1982 to 1992, then referred to as Liopleurodon cf. macromerus in 1997, before being classified simply as Liopleurodon sp. from 2007 to 2011. A new preparation of the specimen allowed Gasparini and José P. O'Gorman to reidentify it as a new species of the genus Pliosaurus, P. patagonicus, the specific epithet referring to Patagonia, the region where the holotype was discovered. The holotype of P. almanzaensis consists of a large, relatively well-preserved skull followed by several vertebrae and skeletal elements from the flippers. It was discovered in 1986 by brothers Sergio and Rafael Cocca in the locality of Cajón de Almanza (hence the name), about 10 km (6.2 mi) east of the village of Loncopué. A field mission was subsequently carried out the same year by the team of the Provincial Museum of Natural Sciences of Zapala, accompanied by Gasparini, in order to determine the possible position of the skull. In February 1987, the entire specimen, later catalogued as MOZ 3728P within the museum, was finally collected, and Luis A. Spalletti precisely determined its stratigraphic position in January 1988. However, the specimen was only formally described in 2018 by O'Gorman, Gasparini, and Spalletti as representing a new species of Pliosaurus, contemporaneous with P. patagonicus.

== Description ==
Plesiosaurs are usually categorized as belonging to the small-headed, long-necked "plesiosauromorph" morphotype or the large-headed, short-necked "pliosauromorph" morphotype, Pliosaurus belonging to the latter category. Like all other plesiosaurs, it had a short tail, a barrel-shaped body, and all of its limbs modified into large flippers.

=== Size ===
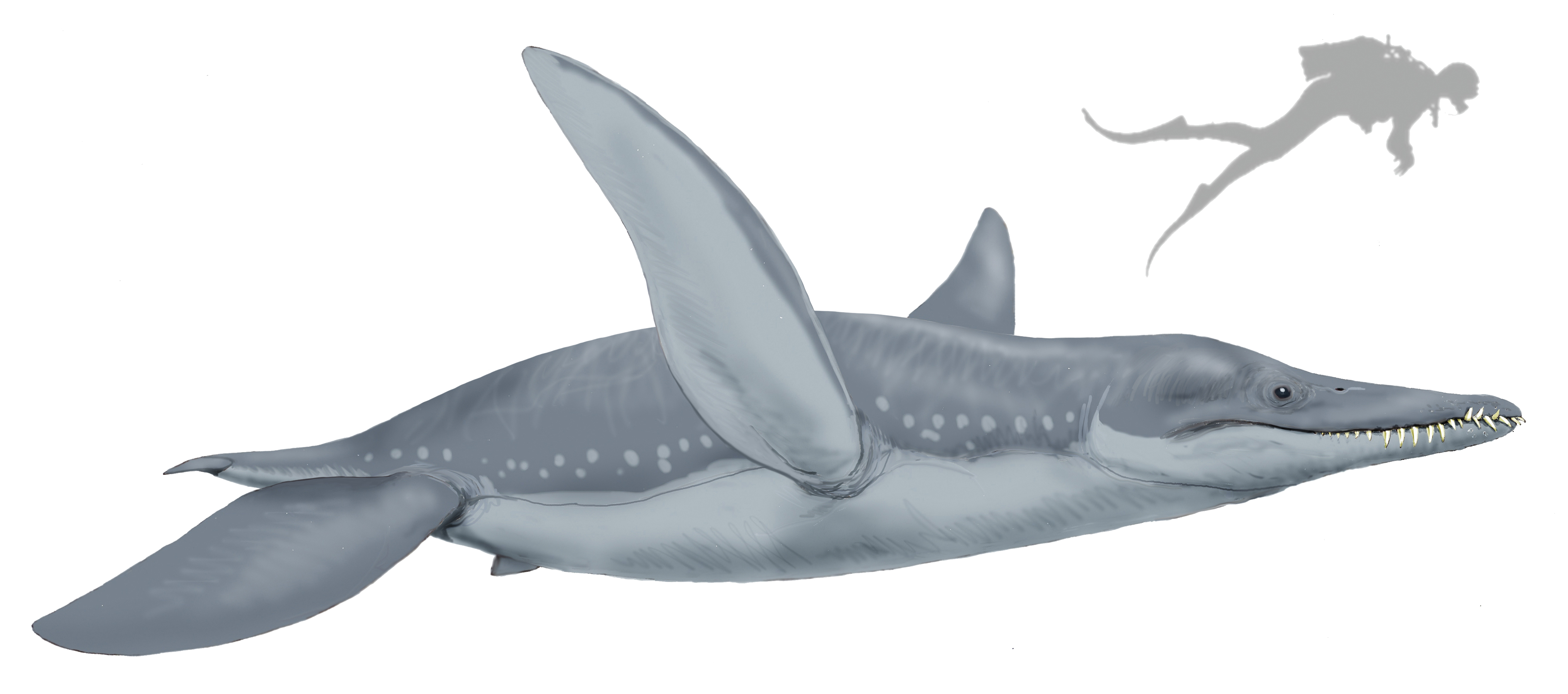
Life restoration of P. funkei

P. funkei and P. kevani are the largest known species of the genus and are among the largest pliosaurs ever discovered in the world. Even before their fossils were formally described in the scientific literature, the media estimated their lengths as ranging from 13 to 15 m (43 to 49 ft) for the P. funkei specimens and from 12 to 16 m (39 to 52 ft) for the holotype of P. kevani. However, more serious estimates published from 2012 reduce these estimates by 10 to 13 m (33 to 43 ft) for a skull exceeding 2 m (6 ft 7 in) in length. In 2023, David Martill and colleagues described four posterior cervical vertebrae from a large specimen putatively assigned as Pliosaurus sp., discovered in the Kimmeridge Clay of Abingdon, Oxfordshire. Based on comparisons made with other pliosaurid genera, the authors gave a body length estimate of 9.8 to 14.4 m (32 to 47 ft). In 2026, Ruizhe Jackevan Zhao compared the specimens attributed to P. cf. kevani and P. funkei, and concluded that both would not be significantly different in terms of measurements, with an estimated body length of 9.8 m (32 ft) and body mass of approximately 10.7–10.9 t (10.5–10.7 long tons; 11.8–12.0 short tons).

Few estimates have been given for other species. The immature status of the holotype specimen of P. brachydeirus suggests that it could have reached larger measurements as an adult. The temporary skeletal mount of the holotype of P. carpenteri suggests a size of about 8 m (26 ft) long for a skull reaching 1.8 m (5 ft 11 in). The holotype skull of P. westburyensis is 1.7 m (5 ft 7 in) long, making it slightly smaller than P. carpenteri.

=== Teeth ===
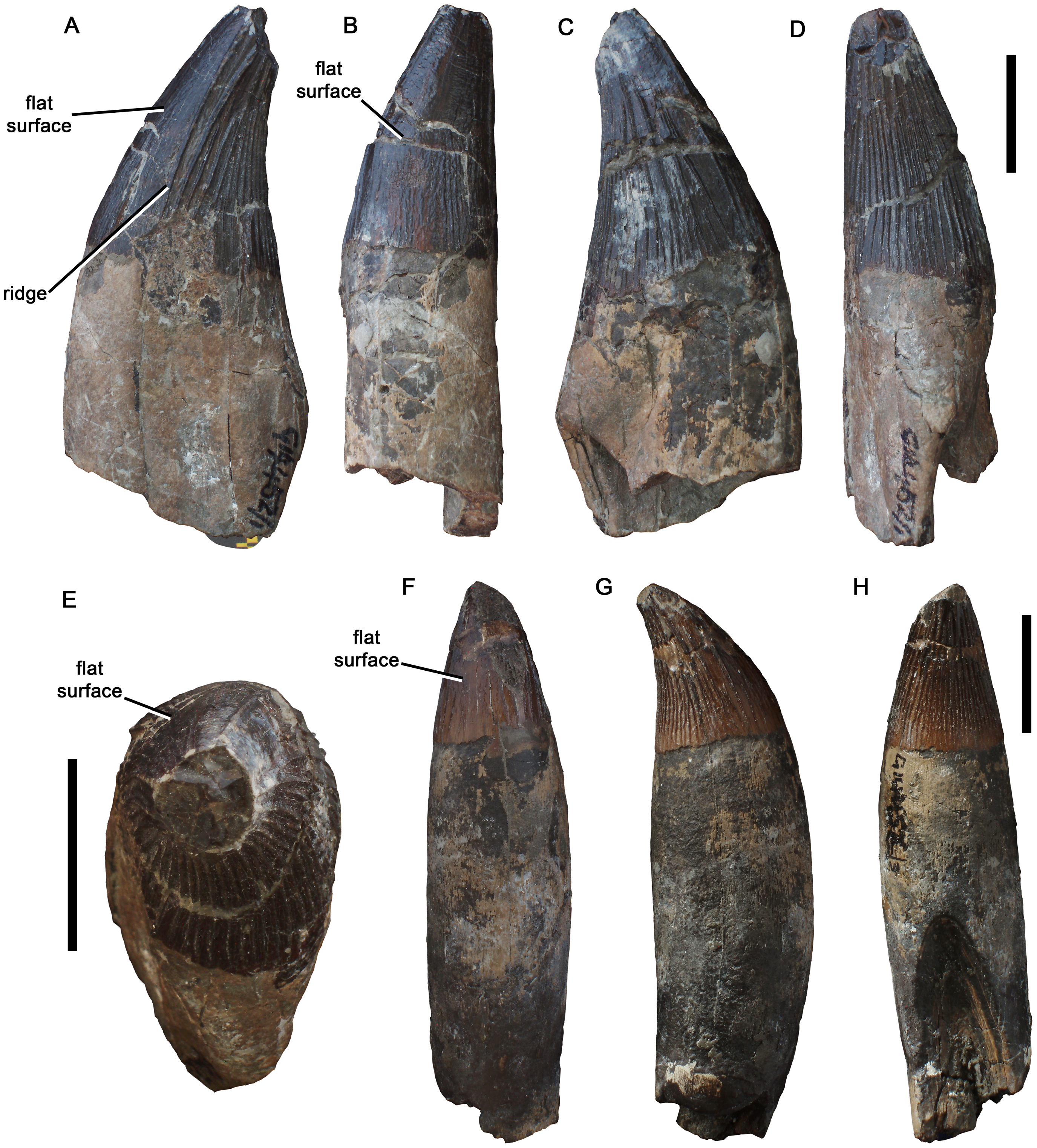
Multi-angle view of two teeth from the holotype of P. kevani

One of the main identifying features of Pliosaurus is that the teeth are often trihedral in cross-section, with flat and smooth labial surfaces (the side facing lips), but convex lingual surfaces (the side facing the tongue) bearing longitudinal enamel ridges. However, P. kevani is the only recognized species in which the teeth are sub-trihedral in shape, possessing slightly flattened labial surfaces with finely distributed enamel ridges. In some species such as P. kevani and P. carpenteri, the premaxillary teeth are anisodont, meaning they vary in size, which is not the case in P. brachydeirus or P. westburyensis.

The different species of Pliosaurus can also be distinguished by the number of teeth present in the premaxillae, maxillae (the latter two sometimes bearing caniniform dentition), the mandibular symphysis, and the dentary as a whole. However, since not all fossils are sufficiently well preserved, the dental counts of some species remain uncertain: P. brachydeirus possessed four to six premaxillary teeth, twenty-two or more maxillary teeth, thirty-five to thirty-seven dentary teeth, and more than seven to thirteen pairs of symphyseal teeth; P. rossicus had six premaxillary teeth and six pairs of symphyseal teeth; P. funkei had at least five premaxillary teeth and six pairs of symphyseal teeth; P. kevani had six premaxillary teeth, about twenty-five maxillary teeth, more than twenty-eight to thirty-seven dentary teeth, and more than six to fifteen pairs of symphyseal teeth; P. westburyensis had more than five premaxillary teeth, about twenty-five maxillary teeth, more than twenty-one dentary teeth, and possibly nine pairs of symphyseal teeth; and P. carpenteri had six premaxillary teeth, more than twenty-seven maxillary teeth, twenty-seven dentary teeth, and eight to nine pairs of symphyseal teeth.

=== Postcranial skeleton ===
The vast majority of recognized Pliosaurus species do not preserve any sufficiently complete postcranial skeletons, making comparisons difficult. A possible exception is P. kevani, one of whose referred specimens consists of a large postcranial skeleton. However, this skeleton cannot be diagnosed with certainty as belonging to a distinct or already known species, despite its current attribution. Thus, the postcranial anatomy of Pliosaurus is primarily known from vertebrae and limb elements documented in the holotype specimens of P. brachydeirus, P. funkei, and P. carpenteri, although rare diagnostic postcranial elements have also been reported in P. rossicus and P. westburyensis.

The cervical vertebrae of Pliosaurus are massive, short, and possess flattened centra that are subcircular to slightly oval in shape. The ventral surface of these vertebrae is an important criterion for distinguishing species. In P. brachydeirus, the ventral surface of the cervical vertebrae is marked by a pronounced longitudinal ridge, a feature absent in P. westburyensis and P. carpenteri. The cervical vertebrae of P. rossicus and P. funkei have rugose ventral surfaces lacking median ridges. Like other pliosaurids that lived during the Jurassic, Pliosaurus likely possessed double-headed cervical ribs. Like other pliosaurids, the pectoral vertebrae of P. funkei bear articulations for their respective ribs, partially on both the centra and neural arches. The dorsal vertebrae are approximately as long as they are wide, in contrast to the cervical vertebrae. Although the caudal vertebrae are poorly known in the genus, with only one documented in P. brachydeirus, they likely supported a tail fin, as documented in other plesiosaurs.

The few known elements of the pectoral girdle in the genus are currently documented only in P. rossicus and P. funkei. These elements are also present in P. carpenteri, but they have not been described in detail in studies concerning this species. The scapula of P. rossicus features a dorsally directed process, and the longitudinal axes of the scapulocoracoid openings intersect at an angle greater than 140°. The coracoid of P. funkei is among the largest identified in pliosaurids. In dorsal view, it is longer than wide, with its width tapering anteriorly. This coracoid also has a more elongate anteromedial process than that of P. rossicus, although this may be explained by ontogenetic factors.

Limb proportions also vary between species. For example, P. funkei is distinguished by particularly elongated forelimbs, which could reach up to 3 metres (9.8 ft), with humeri whose length exceeds seven times the average width of the cervical vertebrae. In comparison, P. rossicus has proportionally shorter limbs, with humeri less than 4.5 times the width of the cervical vertebrae. The radius and ulna of P. funkei are nearly equal in proportions, being about twice as long as they are wide. The phalanges are hourglass-shaped, becoming shorter and narrower distally. The tibia and fibula of P. brachydeirus are shorter than they are wide, a feature generally observed only in polycotylids. In P. carpenteri, the radius, ulna, tibia, and fibula are characterized by highly convex proximal articular surfaces.

== Classification ==
=== History of taxonomy ===
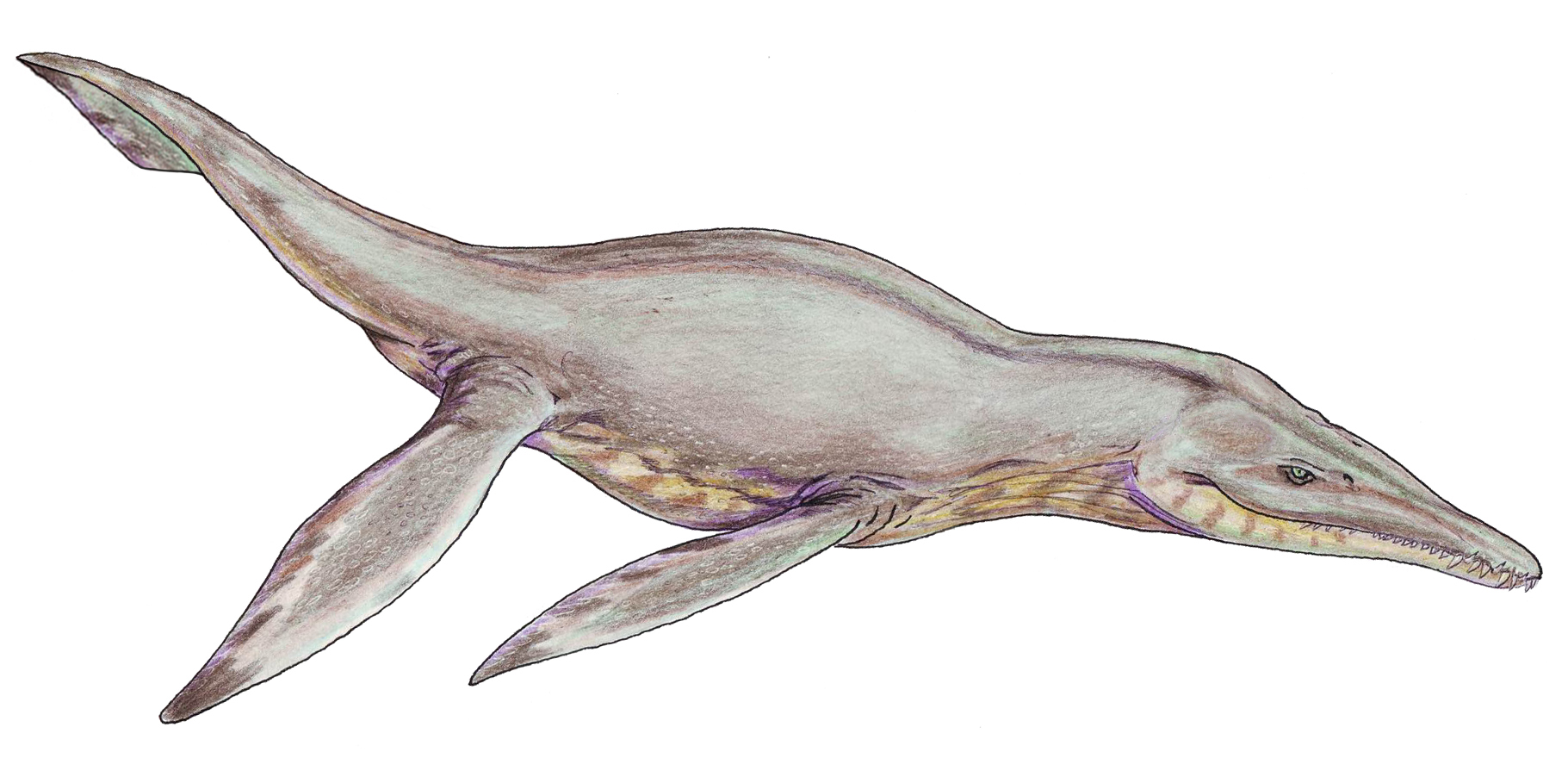
Life restoration of P. brachydeirus.

Although being the type genus of pliosaurids, Pliosaurus was for nearly two centuries a poorly understood taxon due to the lack of an adequate description of the holotype of P. brachydeirus. This led in particular to many pliosaur genera since recognised as distinct being sometimes considered species, or even junior synonyms, of Pliosaurus. In 1960, Halstead (then called Tarlo) revised the taxonomy of Late Jurassic pliosaurids, making the first revision of the type genus. In his paper, he considered the following three species as valid: P. brachydeirus, P. brachyspondylus, and the newly described P. andrewsi. Simultaneously with the publication of the official description of P. funkei in 2012, Another article written by Knutsen alone and concerning the taxonomic revision of the genus Pliosaurus as a whole is published. According to him, the species P. brachydeirus, P. brachyspondylus, P. macromerus, P. rossicus (Note: When he described the proposed neotype of P. macromerus, Knutsen suggested that P. rossicus might be a synonym, noting the shared presence of only six symphyseal tooth sockets and five premaxillary tooth sockets. However, he maintained the validity of both taxa, as their stratigraphic ranges do not overlap and the specimens have not been adequately described. The following year, Benson and colleagues observed that the proposed neotype of P. macromerus actually possesses seven symphyseal tooth sockets, and that it may originally have had as many as nine in life. Thus, this difference was considered sufficient to distinguish it from P. rossicus. The authors of this study even provisionally classify a specimen historically attributed to P. macromerus, discovered in Cumnor, Oxfordshire, as belonging to P. rossicus on the basis of the number of symphyseal tooth sockets.) and P. funkei are valid. However, he maintains the validity of both species P. brachyspondylus and P. macromerus on the basis of proposed neotypes, their original type specimens being deemed non-diagnostic. P. andrewsi, which was long considered a valid species of the genus, turns out to have too many morphological differences to be placed in Pliosaurus. In 2013, Benson and colleagues recognised the validity of the following six species: P. brachydeirus, P. rossicus, P. funkei, P. kevani, P. westburyensis, and P. carpenteri. As no formal petition to ICZN was made to designate the neotypes of P. brachyspondylus and P. macromerus, these two species are then considered as dubious.

=== Systematics and phylogeny ===
In 1874, Harry Govier Seeley named a new family of plesiosaurs, Pliosauridae, to contain forms similar to Pliosaurus. Exactly how pliosaurids are related to other plesiosaurs is uncertain. In 1940, palaeontologist Theodore E. White considered pliosaurids to be close relatives of Elasmosauridae based on shoulder anatomy. However, in 1943, Samuel P. Welles thought that pliosaurids were more similar to Polycotylidae, as they both had large skulls and short necks, among other characteristics. He grouped these two families into the superfamily Pliosauroidea, with other plesiosaurs forming the superfamily Plesiosauroidea. Another plesiosaur family, Rhomaleosauridae, has since been assigned to Pliosauroidea, while Polycotylidae has been reassigned to Plesiosauroidea. However, in 2012, Benson and colleagues recovered a different topology, with Pliosauridae being more closely related to Plesiosauroidea than Rhomaleosauridae. This pliosaurid-plesiosauroid clade was termed Neoplesiosauria.

In 1960, Halstead considered Pliosaurus to be a close relative of Peloneustes, since both taxa had elongated mandibular symphyses. According to him, the genus Pliosaurus would comprise a chronospecific sequence represented, in order of succession, by the species P. andrewsi, P. brachyspondylus, and P. brachydeirus. In 2001, F. Robin O’Keefe recovered Pliosaurus as the sister taxon of Brachauchenius. However, in 2008, Adam S. Smith and Gareth J. Dyke considered Pliosaurus to be the sister taxon of Peloneustes. In 2012, Patrick S. Druckenmiller and Knutsen recovered the genus Pliosaurus as a monophyletic group comprising the species P. brachydeirus, P. rossicus, P. funkei, P. brachyspondylus, and P. macromerus, although their cladogram also included an unspecified specimen catalogued as NHMUK R2439. In 2013, Benson and Druckenmiller named a new clade within Pliosauridae, Thalassophonea. This clade included the "classic", short-necked pliosaurids while excluding the earlier, long-necked, more gracile forms. Since the publication of this study, Pliosaurus has since been seen as being related to Gallardosaurus. In the same year, in order to keep the genus Pliosaurus as monophyletic again, Benson and colleagues removed Gallardosaurus, P. rossicus and its potential junior synonym P. irgisensis from their cladogram. The inclusion of the species P. patagonicus and P. almanzaensis within the genus Pliosaurus has been discussed by some authors. In 2019, María Páramo-Fonseca and colleagues considered that these two taxa do not appear to form a monophyletic group with the European species of the genus. In 2023, Valentin Fischer and colleagues recovered P. almanzaensis within the genus in their cladograms, but placed P. patagonicus among the Brachaucheninae, a subgroup of thalassophoneans whose representatives mainly lived during the Cretaceous. Some of their alternative cladograms even recover the species as the sister taxon of the Russian genus Luskhan.

The following cladogram follows the Bayesian analysis made by Fischer et al. (2023), although the species P. brachyspondylus, P. macromerus and P. irgisensis are considered as doubious.

- Pliosauridae
  - Attenborosaurus conybeari
  - - Thalassiodracon hawkinsi
    - - - Hauffiosaurus zanoni
        - Hauffiosaurus tomistomimus
        - Hauffiosaurus longirostris
      - - Anguanax zignoi
        - Marmornectes candrewi
        - Thalassophonea
          - Peloneustes philarchus
          - - "Pliosaurus" andrewsi
            - - Simolestes vorax
              - - Liopleurodon ferox
                - - Gallardosaurus iturraldei
                  - - Pliosaurus almanzaensis
                    - Pliosaurus irgisensis
                    - Pliosaurus rossicus
                    - Pliosaurus brachyspondylus
                    - Pliosaurus macromerus
                    - Pliosaurus brachydeirus
                    - Pliosaurus carpenteri
                    - Pliosaurus westburyensis
                    - Pliosaurus funkei
                    - - Pliosaurus kevani
                      - Pliosaurus cf. kevani
                  - Brachaucheninae
                    - Pliosaurus patagonicus
                    - - Luskhan itilensis
                      - - - Makhaira rossica
                          - Stenorhynchosaurus munozi
                        - - Acostasaurus pavachoquensis
                          - - Sachicasaurus vitae
                            - - Monquirasaurus boyacensis
                              - Kronosaurus-Eiectus
                              - - QM F51291
                                - - Brachauchenius MNA
                                  - Brachauchenius lucasi
                                  - Megacephalosaurus eulerti
                                  - Polyptychodon sp.

== Paleobiology ==
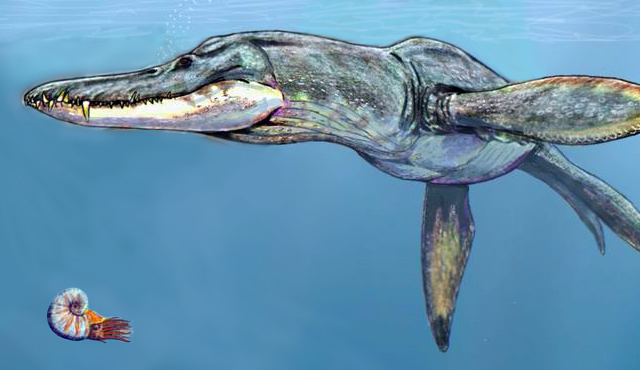
Life restoration of P. rossicus

Plesiosaurs were well-adapted to marine life. They grew at rates comparable to those of birds and had high metabolisms, indicating homeothermy or even endothermy. A 2019 study by palaeontologist Corinna Fleischle and colleagues found that plesiosaurs had enlarged red blood cells, based on the morphology of their vascular canals, which would have aided them while diving. Plesiosaurs such as Pliosaurus employed a method of swimming known as subaqueous flight, using their flippers as hydrofoils. Plesiosaurs are unusual among marine reptiles in that they used all four of their limbs, but not movements of the vertebral column, for propulsion. The short tail, while unlikely to have been used to propel the animal, could have helped stabilise or steer the plesiosaur. Computer modelling by Susana Gutarra and colleagues in 2022 found that due to their large flippers, a plesiosaur would have produced more drag than a comparably-sized cetacean or ichthyosaur. However, plesiosaurs counteracted this with their large trunks and body size. Due to the reduction in drag by their shorter, deeper bodies, Judy Massare proposed in 1988 that plesiosaurs could actively search for and pursue their food instead of having to lie in wait for it.

=== Feeding mechanics ===
Pliosaurus is interpreted by palaeontologists as a marine predator at the top of the food chain, with powerful cranial musculature that gave it an exceptionally strong bite, although its skull was relatively weak against twisting or lateral bending. Unlike basal thalassophoneans such as Peloneustes and Luskhan, which were better adapted to small, mobile prey, Pliosaurus appeared to favor a predatory strategy based on short, targeted bites, delivered to the back of the jaw where the force of pressure was greatest. This anatomical configuration suggests that it avoided violently shaking or twisting its prey, which could compromise the integrity of its skull. It likely captured a wide variety of marine prey, ranging from medium-sized fish to smaller marine reptiles, which it subdued by firmly immobilizing with its robust jaws before crushing or swallowing them in dismemberment. This strategy of combining muscular power and attack precision allowed it to adapt to a wide range of prey, characteristic of a generalist predator of the Jurassic seas.

The second study focuses on bite force. By modeling the mandibular musculature and reconstructing the geometry of the skull using computed tomography and finite element analysis techniques, the researchers determined that the force exerted ranged from 9,600 to 48,000 newtons (2,160 to 10,790 lbf) depending on the area of the lower jaws, a force comparable to, or even greater than, that of the largest living crocodilians. Since this power was concentrated in the back of the jaw, this suggests that P. kevani used a biting strategy designed to puncture or crush robust prey. However, despite this impressive force, the cranial structure has certain weaknesses when faced with bending or lateral torsional stresses. This also indicates that P. kevani did not kill its prey by violent jerks, but by a direct and powerful bite, optimized to quickly incapacitate large prey without excessive head movements. Such behavior was also suggested for the holotype of P. westburyensis in 1993. A Pliosaurus-like pliosaur has also been suggested to have inflicted bite marks upon an indeterminate ophthalmosaurid ichthyosaur by Nikolay Zverkov and colleagues in 2015.

=== Sensory functions ===
Pliosaurs are generally regarded as visually oriented predators. The cranial anatomy of the holotype specimen of P. westburyensis reveals greatly enlarged orbits, indicative of large eyes and suggesting a high degree of visual acuity. Sclerotic rings known from other pliosaurs support this interpretation and point to vision specifically adapted to aquatic environments. In contrast, the lack of acoustic isolation in the auditory capsules indicates that, unlike modern cetaceans, pliosaurs did not possess echolocation. The size and arrangement of the orbits further suggest that their vision was effective under low-light conditions, such as in the turbid waters of coastal seas or the deeper part of the photic zone. Similarly, P. carpenteri is thought to have possessed limited stereoscopic vision but a wide lateral field of view. The nasal cavities of Pliosaurus are remarkably small relative to the size of the skull, too reduced to provide effective respiration. This peculiarity has led to the hypothesis that these structures were not primarily involved in ventilation but instead had a sensory function. By analogy with Rhomaleosaurus, it has been suggested that the nares were used for aquatic olfaction, with water passing through inverted palatal grooves toward the internal choanae. This interpretation would explain why the size of the nares did not scale proportionally with that of the animal, as their role was related to chemical detection rather than respiration.

In another study published slightly earlier in 2014, Foffa and colleagues also described the internal anatomy of the rostrum of the P. kevani holotype, again using computed CT scans. These revealed a neurovascular system within the premaxillae, whose canals, filled with sediment and pyrite, were clearly distinguishable from digital models of the surrounding bone. The largest canals reach 23 mm (0.91 in) in diameter, while the finest branches, about 2 mm (0.079 in) wide, extend to the periphery of the rostrum. At the level of the sixth premaxillary tooth socket, there is evidence of a major branching from which a second canal arises, a feature also observed in theropod dinosaurs of the spinosaurid group, such as Spinosaurus and Baryonyx. The canals connect the interior of the bones to more than two hundred small foramina visible on the surface, primarily on the premaxillae and maxillae. Some of these canals open near the tooth alveoli, while others emerge directly on the dorsal and lateral surfaces of the snout. Together, they form a complex neurovascular system indicating dense innervation and developed vascularization in the rostral region. This network is interpreted as the termination of branches of the trigeminal nerve, which would have transmitted sensory information from the skin to the animal’s brain. Such neurovascular systems are comparable to those observed in several extant and extinct animals, including crocodilians, Spinosaurus, lepidosauromorphs, ichthyosaurs, and other sauropterygians (the group including plesiosaurs and their close relatives). The authors of the study emphasize, however, that the exact function of the neurovascular network in P. kevani remains uncertain, although the very high number of innervated pits on its rostrum suggests a sensory role likely related to detecting movements in the water, a valuable adaptation for hunting in low-light conditions. Similar rostral structures have been reported in the holotype specimens of P. carpenteri and P. westburyensis, but these have not yet been described in detail.

=== Paleopathology ===
In their 2012 publication describing the cranial anatomy of the future holotype of P. carpenteri, Sassoon and colleagues identified several bone pathologies that had affected the animal during adulthood. Detailed observations revealed erosive osteoarthritis of the mandibular joint, particularly at the articular glenoid surfaces, which led to a progressive misalignment of the lower jaw: the joint surfaces are irregularly hollowed and show extensive deformation consistent with advanced articular degeneration. This type of lesion is interpreted as analogous to osteoarthritis in modern vertebrates. Among other anomalies observed in the specimen are the presence of callus-like bone growth around certain tooth alveoli and irregular lateral cavities in the mandible, suggesting repeated episodes of stress or trauma affecting the jaw bones. Together, these pathological modifications indicate not only age-related degenerative disease, but also long-term mechanical consequences—such as asymmetric biting caused by the altered joint—which likely influenced the animal’s ability to capture and process prey over time.

When Taylor and Cruickshank described in 1993 what would later become the holotype specimen of P. westburyensis, they interpreted an asymmetric rugosity of the parietal crest as a pathological feature, possibly related to a tumor or to a reaction following trauma, such as an infection or a wound. However, as similar structures have been observed in other pliosaurs, Sassoon and colleagues instead proposed that it represents a variable character, even suggesting the possibility of sexual dimorphism, in line with their interpretation of specimens BRSMG Cc332 and BRSMG Cc6172, although this latter view has since been contradicted by Benson et al. (2013). In this same latter study, the authors also report the presence of a pronounced and irregular depression on the ventral surface of the fused squamosal bones of the holotype skull of P. kevani. This feature could correspond to a pathology, a bite mark, or an alteration of the bone surface that occurred during the specimen's biostratinomic history.

== Paleoecology ==
=== England ===
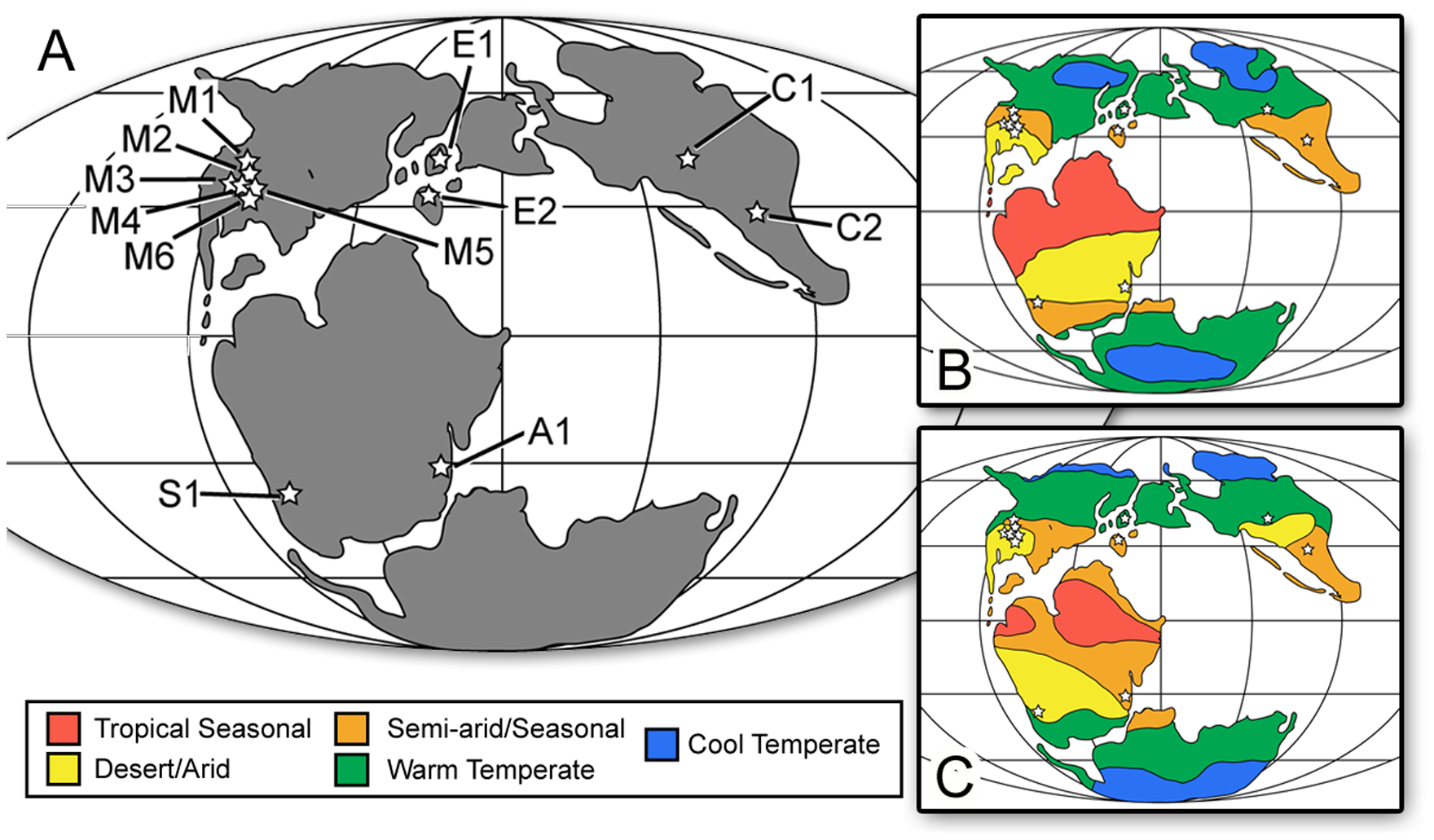
Map of the world in the Jurassic, the Kimmeridge Clay Formation is located at E1

P. brachydeirus, P. kevani, P. westburyensis, P. carpenteri and a possible specimen of P. rossicus are known from the Kimmeridgian and Tithonian stages of the Upper Jurassic in the Kimmeridge Clay Formation, England. This formation was deposited in a deep-sea marine environment reaching about 150 to 200 m (490 to 660 ft) depth, known as the Jurassic Sub-Boreal Seaway. Known invertebrates are mainly represented by ammonites and crustaceans.

=== Slavic regions ===
In Russia, the first two known specimens of P. rossicus were discovered in Tithonian rocks of the Lower Volga Basin. Due to the abundant presence of the ammonite Dorsoplanites panderi in the type locality of the taxon, the stratigraphic unit thus bears this name. Little is known or published about Volga fossils from this period, although a fairly large number of invertebrates have been recorded. These include ammonites, bivalves, radiolarians, and dinoflagellates. Except P. rossicus and the dubious P. irgisensis, fossils of several contemporary marine reptiles have been discovered, including several species of ichthyosaurs in the region, notably the ophthalmosaurids Arthropterygius, Grendelius, Nannopterygius and Undorosaurus. In addition, fossils belonging to a metriorhynchid thalattosuchian are also known from contemporary sediments in this region. In 2015, a single tooth discovered at the summit of Mount Sheludivaya in Crimea was attributed to Pliosaurus by Zverkov on the basis of the typical trihedral shape of the genus. Dating to the late Valanginian of the Early Cretaceous, it represents the most recent known occurrence of the genus in the fossil record. Prior to this find, brachauchenines were the only pliosaurids thought to have persisted across the Jurassic–Cretaceous boundary.

=== Svalbard ===
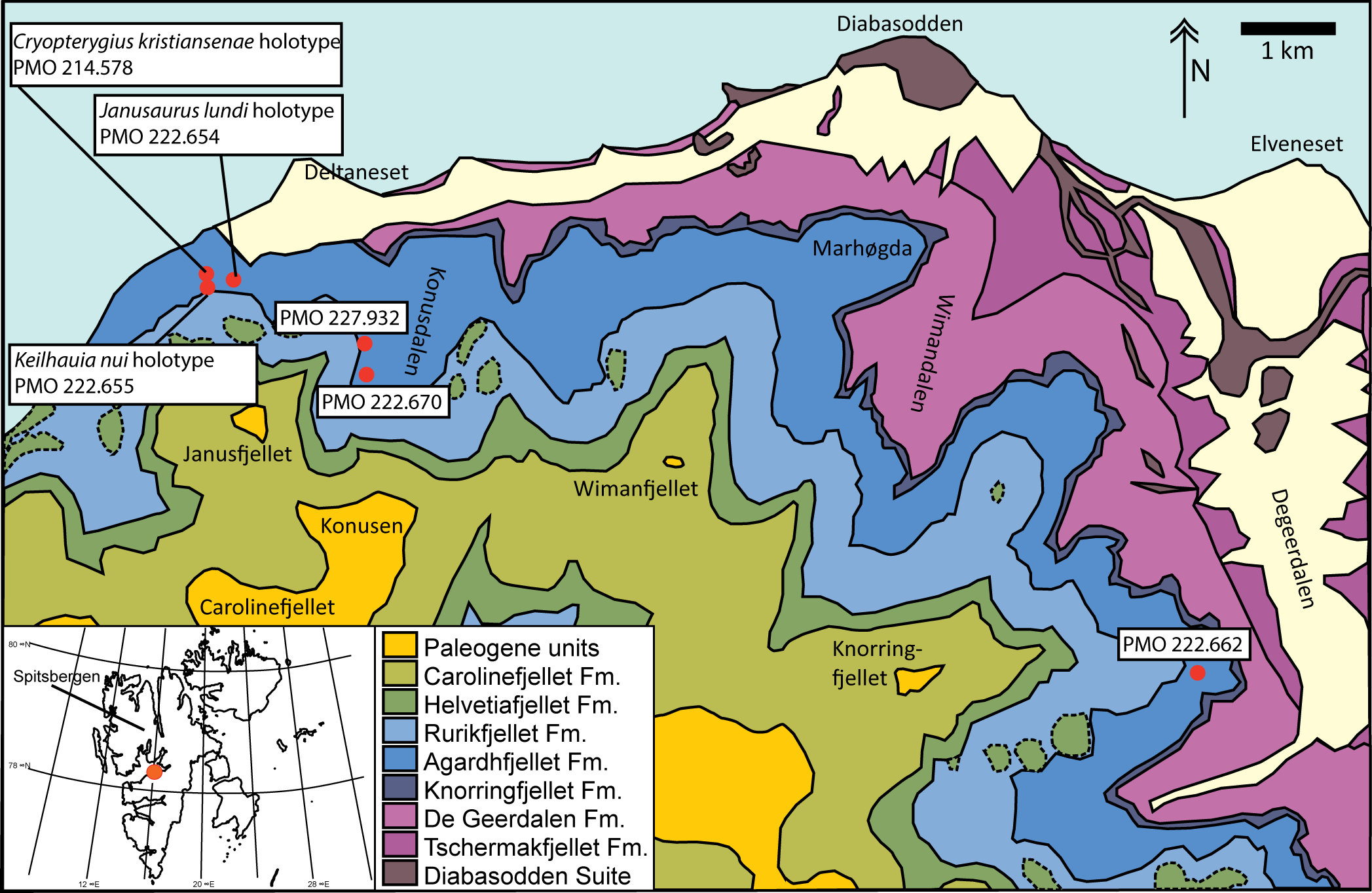
Geological map of central Svalbard, Norway. The Agardhfjellet Formation, from which P. funkei is known, is shown in dark blue

In Svalbard, P. funkei is known from Tithonian-aged rocks of the Slottsmøya Member of the Agardhfjellet Formation. This unit consists of a mix of shales and siltstones and was deposited in a shallow water methane seep environment. The seafloor, which was located about 150 m (490 ft) below the surface, seems to have been relatively dysoxic, or oxygen-poor, although it was periodically oxygenated by clastic sediments. Despite this, near the top of the member, various diverse assemblages of invertebrates associated with cold seeps have been discovered; these include ammonites, lingulate brachiopods, bivalves, rhynchonellate brachiopods, tubeworms, belemnoids, tusk shells, sponges, crinoids, sea urchins, brittle stars, starfish, crustaceans and gastropods. Though direct evidence from Slottsmøya is currently lacking, the high latitude of this site and relatively cool global climate of the Tithonian mean that sea ice was likely present at least in the winter. A considerable number of plesiosaurs and ichthyosaurs are known from the Slottsmøya Member. As a large apex predator, P. funkei may have included some of them in its diet. Aside from P. funkei itself, the other plesiosaurs reported are Colymbosaurus, Djupedalia, Ophthalmothule, and Spitrasaurus, all of which belong to the family Cryptoclididae. The contemporary ichthyosaurs known from the Slottsmøya Member are ophthalmosaurids of the genera Arthropterygius, Brachypterygius, Undorosaurus, and Nannopterygius. Many of the fossils of these marine reptiles are preserved in three dimensions and partially articulated, a condition correlated with the high abundance of organic material in the sediments in which they were buried, as well as the absence of local invertebrates.

== See also ==
- List of plesiosaur genera
- Timeline of plesiosaur research
