= Predator X (TV program) =

2009 television special on the History Channel

Predator X is a 2009 television special on the History Channel. The show documents the excavation of a giant pliosaur on an island in the Norwegian Svalbard archipelago. The special follows Dr. Jørn Hurum and a team of paleontologists from the University of Oslo as they excavate the site.

The specimen — claimed by Hurum at the time to be a new species — had not received a taxonomic classification by the time of the television special and was, therefore, codenamed "Predator X". The team initially called their discovery "The Monster", and the nickname has been used extensively by the media.

The initial discovery was made in 2006, as part of a find of dozens of pliosaur and plesiosaur specimens. First estimates were of nearly 15 m (49 ft) in length, "The Monster" is the largest pliosaur skeleton ever discovered, considerably larger than Kronosaurus. This estimate was later downsized to around 10~12m, and was then further revised to 9.8~10.3m, making it comparable to Kronosaurus in size.

In 2012, it was given the taxonomic name Pliosaurus funkei.
