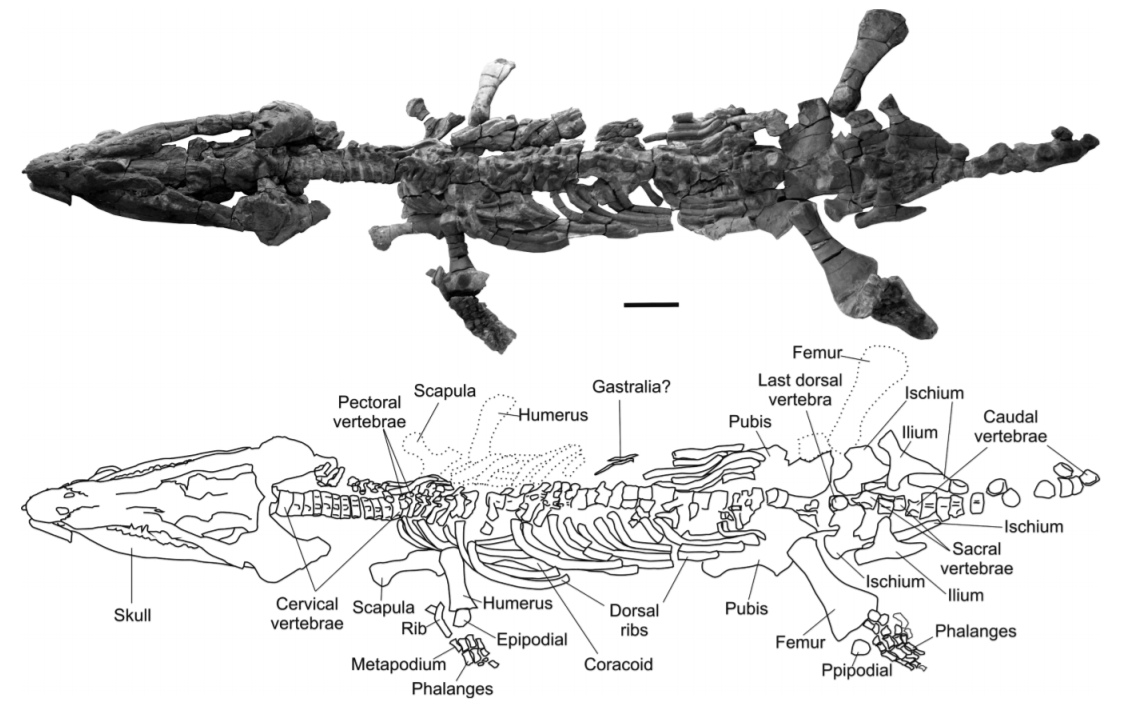
- Holotype specimen of Sachicasaurus.

Scientific classification
- Kingdom: Animalia
- Phylum: Chordata
- Class: Reptilia
- Superorder: †Sauropterygia
- Order: †Plesiosauria
- Suborder: †Pliosauroidea
- Family: †Pliosauridae
- Subfamily: †Brachaucheninae
- Genus: †Sachicasaurus
- Species: †S. vitae

Binomial name
- †Sachicasaurus vitae Páramo Fonseca et al., 2018

= Sachicasaurus =

Sachicasaurus Temporal range: Early Cretaceous (Barremian) ~130–120 Ma

Extinct genus of pliosaurid

Sachicasaurus is an extinct genus of brachauchenine pliosaurid known from the Barremian of the Paja Formation, Altiplano Cundiboyacense in the Colombian Eastern Ranges of the Andes. The type species and only species is S. vitae.

== Etymology ==
The genus name Sachicasaurus refers to Sáchica, the location where the fossil was found, and saurus, meaning "lizard" in Latinised Greek. The species epithet vitae, meaning "of life" in Latin, was chosen because of the life in Sáchica the fossil find has sparked.

== Description ==
Size comparison

Sachicasaurus was a large pliosaur, with the type specimen measuring approximately 10–10.35 metres (32.8–34.0 ft) long and weighing 10.3–12.8 metric tons (11.4–14.1 short tons). The holotype specimen, MP111209-1, was found in 2013 and is known from a near complete skull, and postcranial elements including a complete hindlimb and various vertebrae. Diagnostic features include a very short mandibular symphysis, reduced number of mandibular teeth (17 to 18 versus 25 to 40 in other pliosaurids), slender teeth, among other features. With a preserved length of 9.9 metres (32 ft) (which may be missing the vertebrae from the end of the tail), the specimen is interpreted as a sub-adult individual. It is one of the largest and most complete pliosaurid specimens.

== Paleoenvironment ==
Sachicasaurus is one of four pliosaurids from the Paja Formation, others being Acostasaurus, Stenorhynchosaurus, and Monquirasaurus. It is also contemporaneous with the elasmosaurids Callawayasaurus and Leivanectes, the marine turtle Desmatochelys padillai, the sandowniid turtle Leyvachelys, and the ophthalmosaurid ichthyosaurs Muiscasaurus and Kyhytysuka.
