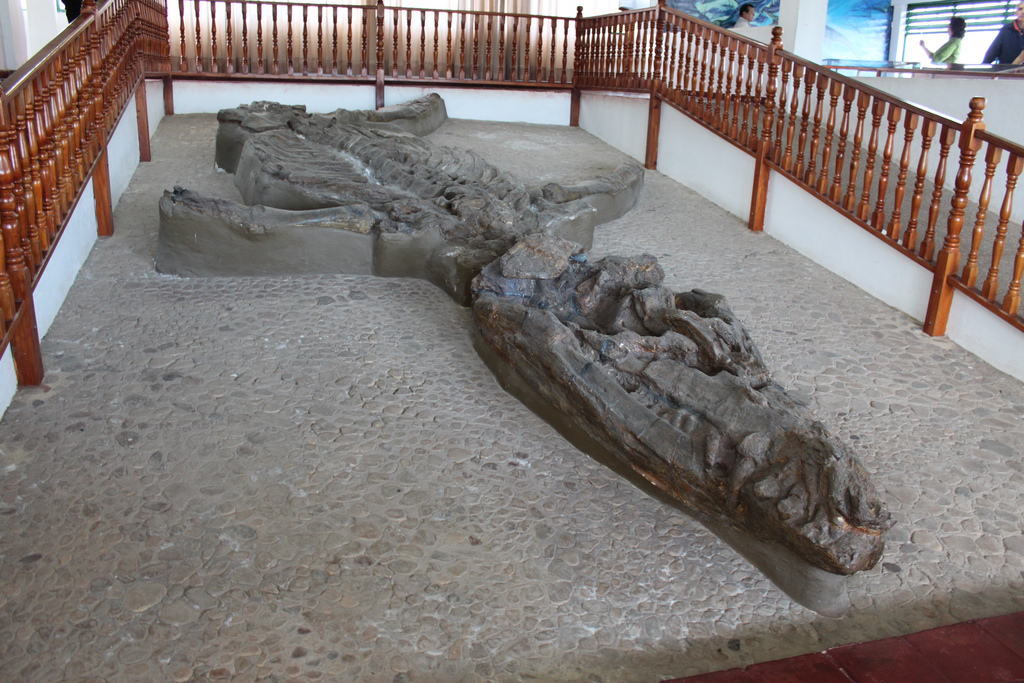
- Holotype specimen in Villa de Leyva, Boyaca, Colombia

Scientific classification
- Kingdom: Animalia
- Phylum: Chordata
- Class: Reptilia
- Superorder: †Sauropterygia
- Order: †Plesiosauria
- Suborder: †Pliosauroidea
- Family: †Pliosauridae
- Genus: †Monquirasaurus; Noè & Gómez-Pérez, 2021
- Species: †M. boyacensis

Binomial name
- †Monquirasaurus boyacensis (Hampe, 1992)

Synonyms
- Kronosaurus boyacensis Hampe, 1992

= Monquirasaurus =

Monquirasaurus Temporal range: late Aptian ~119–112 Ma

Extinct genus of reptiles

Monquirasaurus ("Monquirá lizard") is an extinct genus of giant short-necked pliosaurs who lived during the Early Cretaceous (Aptian) in what is now Colombia. One species is known, M. boyacensis, described in 2021 from an almost complete fossil skeleton, discovered in 1977 in the town of Villa de Leyva, located in Boyacá. Published descriptions of the holotype specimen estimate that it should reach a total size approaching 9–11 m (30–36 ft) in length and weighing nearly 10 metric tons (11 short tons), making Monquirasaurus a large representative of the pliosaurids.

The taxon has long been informally identified as a species belonging to the related genus Kronosaurus, even being named Kronosaurus boyacensis in a study published in 1992. This identification was because the holotype specimen was not made available to researchers, and the descriptions were made from photographs. It was not until 2021 that a more complete description of the skeleton was made, confirming that it belonged to a separate genus.

The site where Monquirasaurus was discovered is the Paja Formation, that was once an environment containing a vast diversity of marine reptiles, including other large related pliosaurs, such as Stenorhynchosaurus and Sachicasaurus.

== History and naming ==
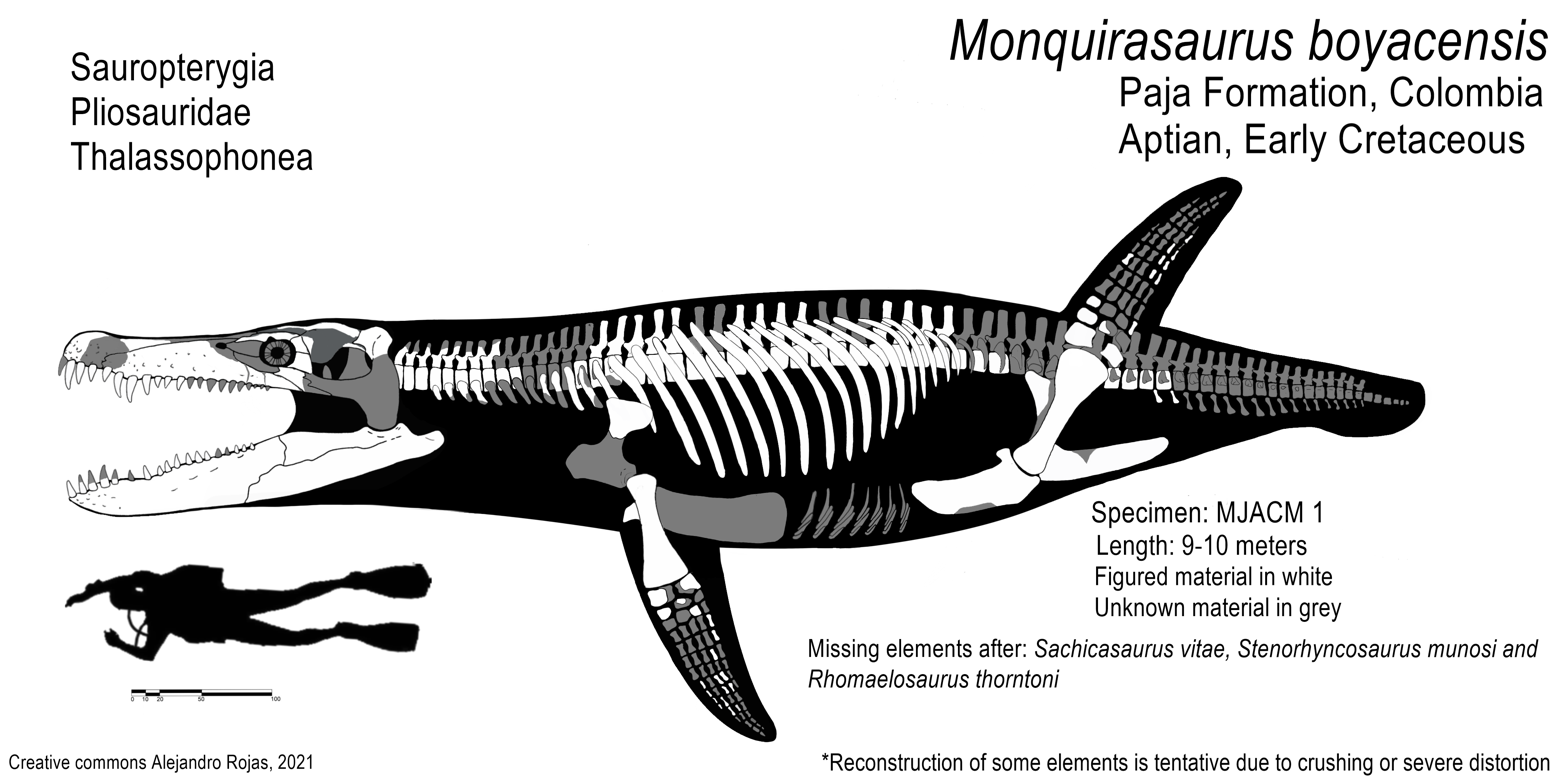
Skeletal diagram with known elements in white and unknown elements in grey

The holotype and only known specimen of Monquirasaurus is a 7.3-metre-long (24 ft) (as preserved), substantially incomplete (have many missing tail vertebrae) and articulated skeleton of a young adult animal discovered in 1977 by Samuel Vargas, Enrique Zubieta and German Zubieta on the lands of Tito Hurtado. Excavations were conducted by geologists, archaeologists and palaeontologists from the Instituto Colombiano de Geología y Minería (now Servicio Geológico Colombiano), the Instituto Colombiano de Antropología e Historia and the Universidad Nacional de Colombia.

Locally the specimen soon became known as "El Fósil", before being formally described as Kronosaurus boyacensis by Hampe in 1992 after being informally attributed to Kronosaurus in the years prior. This description, however, was conducted using photographs and remote imaging techniques, as the Junta de Acción Comunal and local community did not allow access to the holotype specimen, resulting in a lacking and untrustworthy description. Not until 2021 was the specimen reexamined first hand and described as a distinct genus, Monquirasaurus boyacensis. The holotype specimen still remains in the type locality, with the local "Museo El Fósil" having been built around the fossil.

The generic name derives from Monquirá, the Vereda (administrative division) where the holotype has been discovered. Similarly, the species name refers to the Boyacá Department.

== Description ==
Size compared to a human

Monquirasaurus was a relatively large pliosaur, with length estimates varying between 9.1 and 11.1 metres (30 and 36 ft) long and body mass estimates around 9.9 metric tons (10.9 short tons). In 2021, Noè & Gómez-Pérez suggested that a sexually mature, sub-adult individual would have measured 8 metres (26 ft) long.

=== Skull ===
The skull of Monquirasaurus is large and blunt, 2.45 m (8.0 ft) long from the snout tip to the posterior end of the right squamosal (2.65 to the posterior end of the retroarticular process of the mandible) and 1.2 m (3.9 ft) wide across the lateral margin of the quadrates. When viewed from the side the cranium is elongated and low; however, it is still severely crushed. The jaws of the holotype are tightly closed and most of the dentition is preserved in situ. The cranium does not only suffer from crushing, but most of the dorsal surface is also heavily weathered and many bones are missing, making it almost impossible to observe most of the skull sutures. The skull has undulating margins, with three lateral expansions visible in dorsal view. The first is present along the lateral margins of the premaxilla, followed by an expansion around the large anterior caniniforms and one just beneath the orbits. A fourth expansion was probably also present in the posterior area of the skull, around the lateral margins of the temporal fenestra. Both anterior expansions are immediately followed by a medial constriction of the cranium. The nares are located 1.13 m (3.7 ft) from the snout tip, anterior to the orbits and on the same level as the 11th maxillary tooth. The mandible is preserved in better condition than the cranium, largely resisting the crushing that affected the latter. There is, however, still some dorsoventral compression present around the mandibular rami.

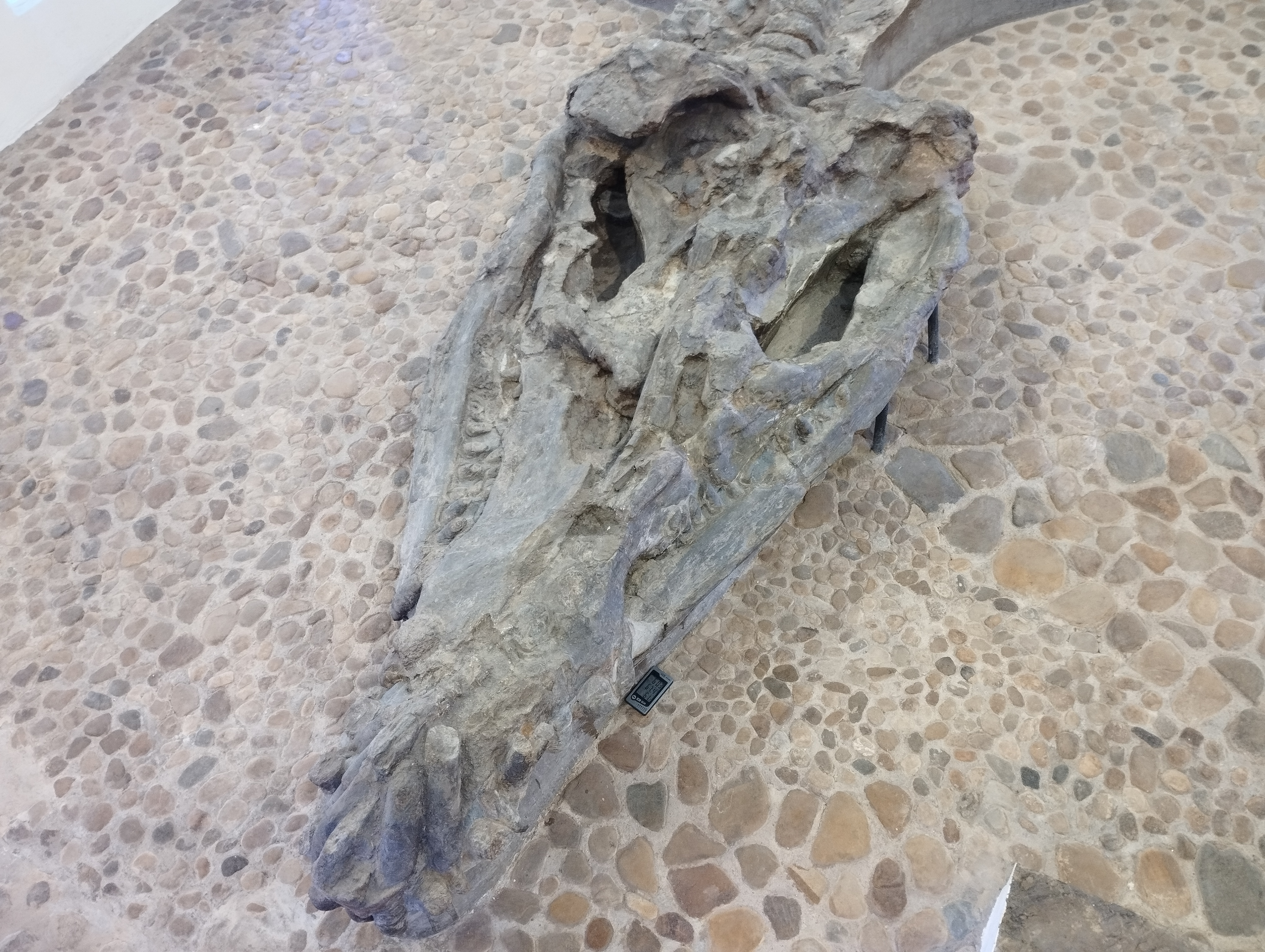
Skull of the holotype

The mandible is robust and resembles classic pliosaurid morphology with large caniniform teeth housed at the anterior margin of the bone. The anterior portion is slightly upturned and expanded as in Simolestes and Acostasaurus. The teeth of Monquirasaurus are round in cross-section with the largest being the caniniforms. The anterior dentition is markedly anisiodont and interlocking, while more posterior areas of the skull have tooth rows overlapping. The anterior caniniforms of the maxilla for instance obscure the dentary teeth of that region, while further posterior the dentary teeth form a pronounced underbite obscuring the posterior maxillary teeth. All of this makes it difficult to determine the original tooth count of the animal.

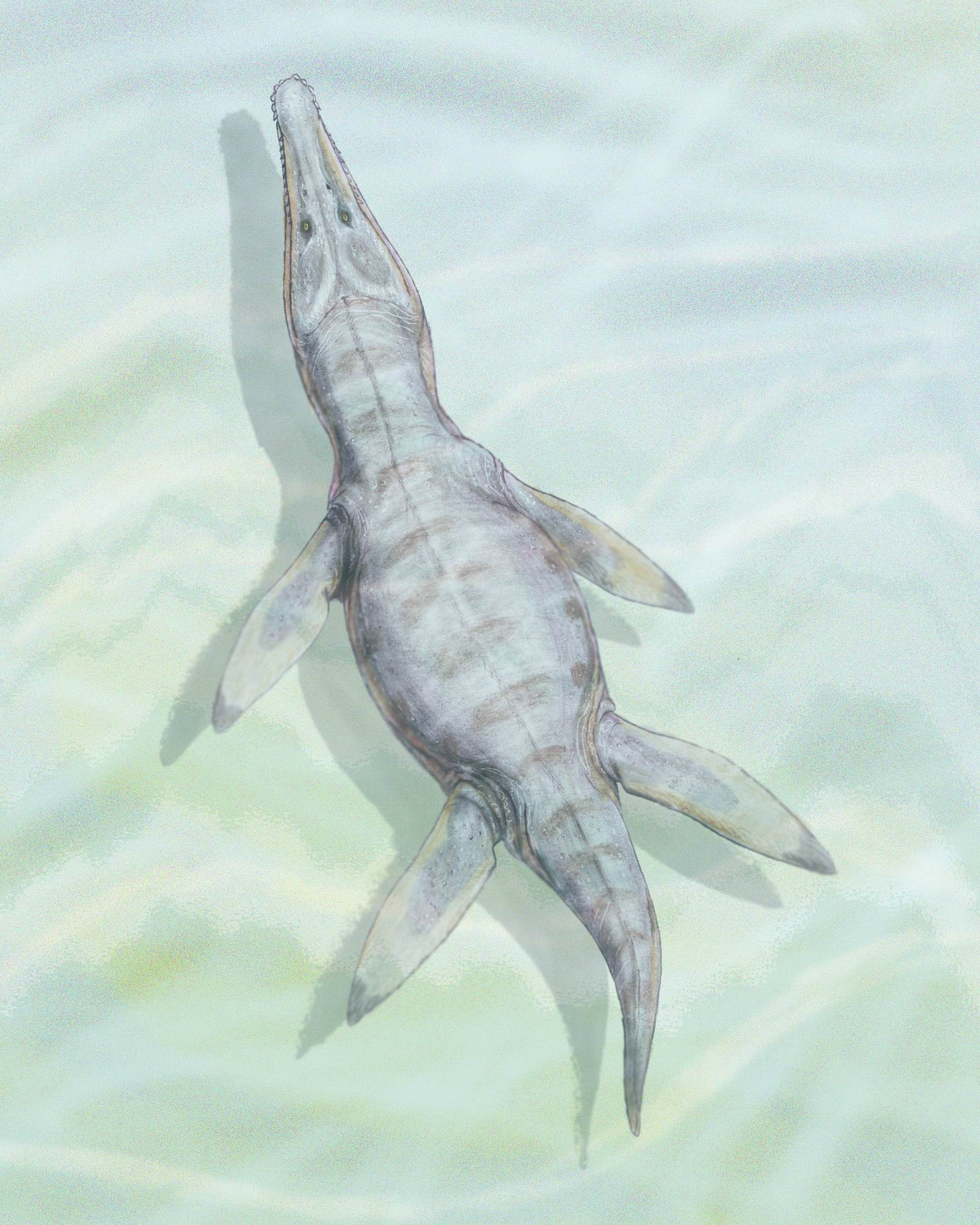
Life restoration

The anterior expansion of the premaxilla contains four teeth on each side, with premaxillary tooth 2 being the largest, extending halfway down the mandible. While the third and fourth teeth are both large in their own right, they are still smaller than the preceding tooth. Some uncertainty surrounds the presence of a small tooth just behind the fourth premaxillary. This area is almost entirely obscured by the fourth dentary caniniform; however, there is a hint of a small alveolus in that area. While the absence of visible sutures makes the separation of premaxillary and maxillary dentition uncertain, Noè & Gómez-Pérez suggest that, if a small tooth would have been present, it would most likely been a maxillary.

They reason that all pliosaurids of the Paja Formation are united through the presence of four premaxillary teeth, while furthermore pointing out that the first maxillary tooth in pliosaurs is oftentimes much smaller and followed by a large caniniform (such as the next preserved tooth in Monquirasaurus). Between the last preserved premaxillary and first maxillary caniniform extends a toothless gap or diastema, equivalent in diameter to the area taken up by a large tooth. The first preserved (potentially second overall) maxillary tooth is the largest in the jaw, although broken on either side this tooth is inferred to have reached beyond the ventral margin of the mandible.

Following this tooth are continuously smaller caniniforms followed by many much smaller maxillary teeth that progressively grow smaller towards the posterior. The anterior mandibular teeth are large and interlocking with the premaxillary teeth. The largest of these is the 4th dentary, which is still smaller than the later maxillary caniniforms, but larger than any of the premaxillary teeth. The dentary teeth after the small 5th tooth are obscured by the maxillary caniniforms; however, most likely also rather small. Larger dentary teeth are preserved posterior to this overlap. Overall Monquirasaurus may have had a minimum of 19 teeth in its upper jaw while the mandibles preserve 19 tooth positions on the right and 23 on the left.

=== Postcranial skeleton ===
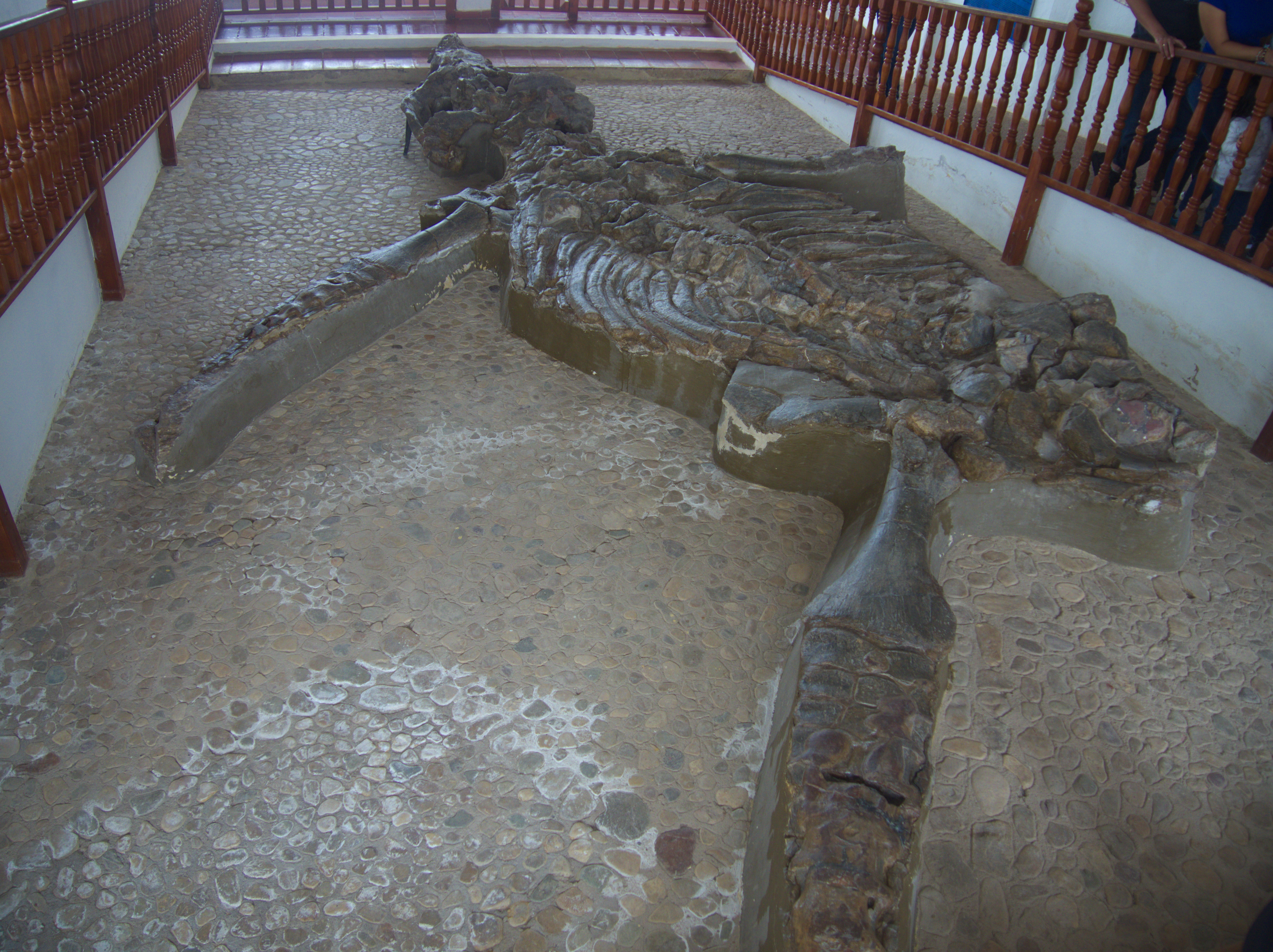
Hind view of the holotype

The body of Monquirasaurus was 4.65 metres (15.3 ft) long along the vertebral column, not including the skull and missing tail. As preserved, the body was broad; however, in life it would have been narrower. The vertebral column is largely preserved in articulation, with some gaps towards the posterior end of the body. The neck of Monquirasaurus was short, with eight articulated vertebrae preserved excluding the atlas-axis complex, which is obscured by the cranium (the presence of a third vertebra obscured by the cranium is possible, but not certain). The cervical series is followed by three pectoral, 22 dorsal and three sacral vertebrae. Out of these vertebrae, the last dorsal and first two sacrals are only preserved as impressions.

The preserved neural arch of the 17th and 18th vertebrae (dorsals 5 and 6) are dorsally subtriangular, narrow anteriorly and flattened posteriorly, suggesting a "tongued-and-grooved" interlocking arrangement. This would make the back stiff and rigid, as in other plesiosaurians. Most of the tail is missing, with only three preserved caudal vertebrae articulating with the sacrals. The appendicular skeleton is only partly preserved, with all limbs missing the distal end of the flippers and girdles obscure by the overlaying torso.

== Phylogeny ==
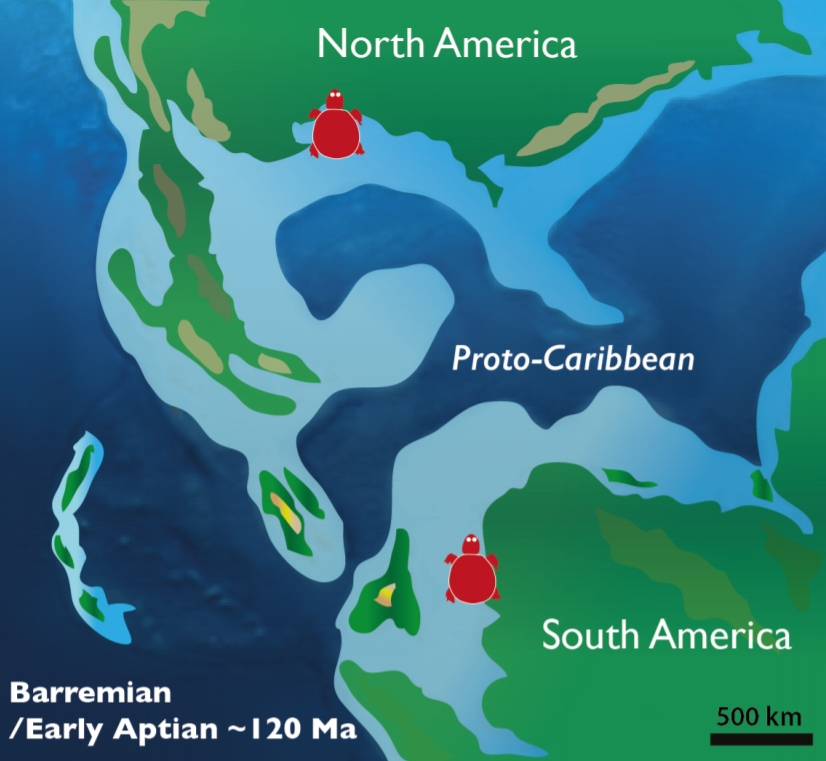
Paleogeography of northern South America during the Barremian and early Aptian

Although Noè & Gómez-Pérez did not conduct a phylogenetic analysis, comparison of the morphology of Monquirasaurus and the morphology of Pliosaurid families suggests that while it was certainly a member of the Pliosauridae, it is considered unlikely to be a member of Brauchaucheniinae, which was previously considered the only Cretaceous pliosaurid lineage. The authors instead suggest that it, alongside Sachicasaurus and Acostosaurus, may have been part of an unrecognized lower-Cretaceous non-Brauchaucheniin family of pliosaurs. However, more extensive phylogenetic analysis are required to support this hypothesis.

== Paleobiology ==
Monquirasaurus was found in the Arcillolitas abigarradas member of the Paja Formation. This formation preserves a shoreface to lower shoreface environment with a great diversity of marine reptiles including elasmosaurids, protostegid and sandownid marine turtles, large-bodied teleosaurids and various ichthyosaurs including the macropredatory Kyhytysuka which was also described in 2021. The formation is also known for its diversity in pliosaurs specifically, with four distinct genera being known from the region. Besides Monquirasaurus, the formation preserves the bones of the relatively small Acostasaurus and Stenorhynchosaurus as well as the giant Sachicasaurus.
