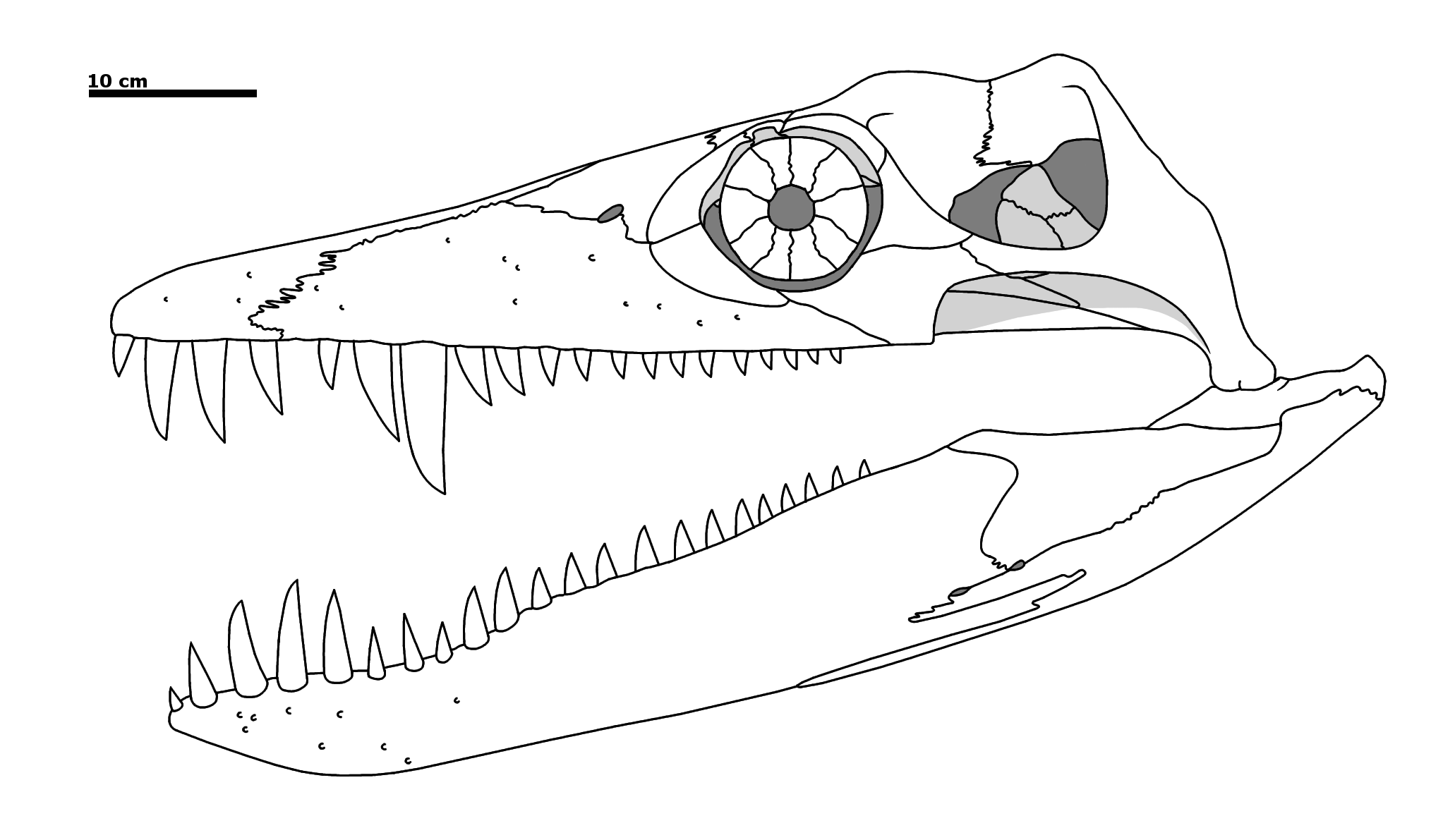
- Cranial reconstruction of Acostasaurus pavachoquensis

Scientific classification
- Kingdom: Animalia
- Phylum: Chordata
- Class: Reptilia
- Superorder: †Sauropterygia
- Order: †Plesiosauria
- Suborder: †Pliosauroidea
- Family: †Pliosauridae
- Genus: †Acostasaurus
- Species: †A. pavachoquensis

Binomial name
- †Acostasaurus pavachoquensis Gómez Pérez & Noè, 2017

= Acostasaurus =

Acostasaurus Temporal range: Barremian ~130–120 Ma

Genus of pliosaurid (fossil)

Acostasaurus (meaning "Acosta's lizard") is an extinct genus of possibly Thalassophonean pliosaurid known from the Barremian of the Paja Formation, Colombia. The type specimen, UNDG R-1000, is known from a near complete skull, and postcranial elements including a complete hindlimb and various vertebrae. The specimen has an estimated size of over 4 metres (13 ft) in length.

== Description ==
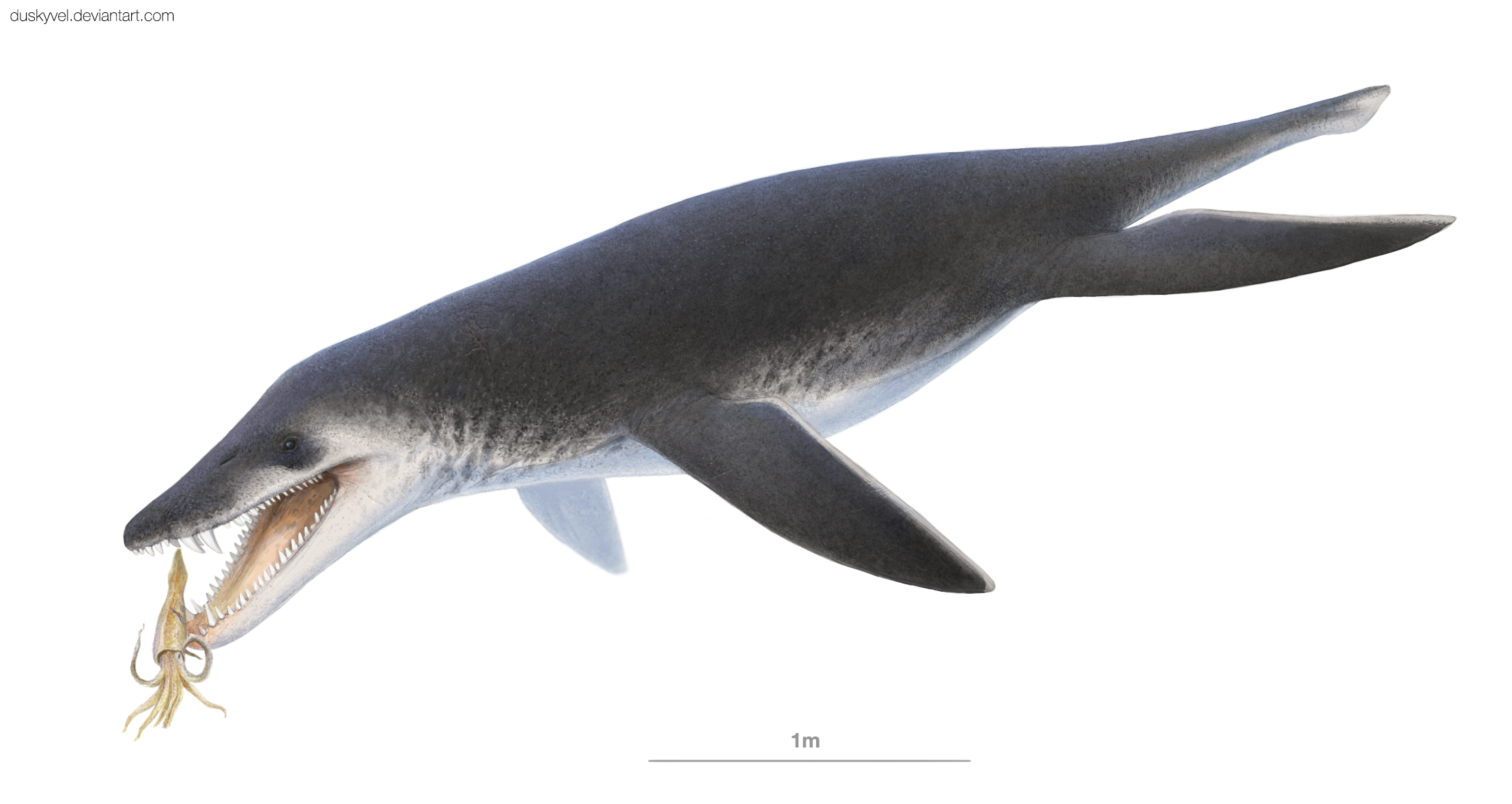
Reconstruction

The type specimen is noted for possessing several features that pertain to a subadult individual: for example, the sagittal crest is not fully ossified, as well as possessing undeveloped palatine wings. It is possible however that Acostasaurus, like other plesiosaurs, was paedomorphic.

From what is preserved, the orbits are large, rounded and deeply notched dorsally. The scleral ring of the specimen is also very large, suggesting that Acostasaurus was adapted to see in deep or murky waters.

An unusual feature of Acostasaurus is that it possesses a short mandibular symphysis, containing only 6 pairs of functional alveoli (5 and ½, considering that the symphysis terminates level with the middle of the sixth pair). The short, wide symphysis is one of the features which differentiates Acostasaurus from other contemporary pliosaurids such as the various brachauchenine pliosaurs from the formation. Other pliosaurids which possess this condition include the Jurassic taxon Simolestes, which like Acostasaururs has large orbits, as well as a short symphysis. Gómez-Pérez et al. note that the base of the functional alveoli in Acostasaurus are confluent with Meckel's canal as in Simolestes, and that it also possessed a heavily swollen and ornamented sagittal crest to form a parietal knob, also found in Simolestes.

== Classification ==
As brachauchenine pliosaurs are the only pliosaurids known from the Barremian stage, especially from Colombia, Gómez Pérez et al. compared Acostasaurus to a variety of brachauchenine taxa in the paper. The authors however concluded that referral of the genus to the subfamily is problematic: Acostasaurus possesses caniniform dentition, whereas brachauchenines possess longirostrine homodont dentition. As discussed before, Simolestes and other less derived pliosaurids possess similar dentition, especially in the arrangement that are present in Acostasaurus.
