= List of marine reptiles =

Following is a list of marine reptiles, reptiles which are adapted to life in marine or brackish environments.

== Extant ==
The following marine reptiles are species which are currently extant or recently extinct.

=== Crocodiles ===
- Crocodylus

Crocodylus acutus (American crocodile)
Crocodylus porosus (Saltwater crocodile)

=== Lizards ===
- Iguanidae

- Amblyrhynchus

Amblyrhynchus cristatus (Marine iguana)

- Varanidae

- Varanus

Varanus indicus (Mangrove monitor)

=== Snakes ===
- Acrochordidae (file snakes)

- Acrochordus

Acrochordus arafurae (Arafura file snake)
Acrochordus granulatus (Little file snake)
Acrochordus javanicus (Javan file snake)

- Dipsadinae

- Farancia

Farancia abacura (Mud snake)
Farancia erytrogramma (Rainbow snake)

- Helicops

Helicops angulatus (Brown-banded water snake)
Helicops infrataeniatus
Helicops scalaris

- Hydrops

Hydrops triangularis

- Leptodeira

Leptodeira rubricata (Costa Rican cat-eyed snake)

- Pseudoeryx

Pseudoeryx relictualis

- Tretanorhinus

Tretanorhinus nigroluteus
Tretanorhinus variabilis

- Grayiinae

- Grayia

Grayia smythii (Smith's African water snake)

- Homalopsidae (Bockadams)

- Bitia hydroides (Keel-bellied water snake)
- Cantoria violacea (Cantor's water snake)
- Cerberus (Dog-faced water snakes)

Cerberus australis
Cerberus dunsoni
Cerberus microlepis
Cerberus rynchops
Cerberus schneiderii

- Djokoiskandarus annulata (Banded water snake)
- Myrrophis

Myrrophis bennettii (Bennett's mud snake)

- Fordonia leucobalia (White-bellied mangrove snake)
- Myron

Myron karnsi
Myron resetari
Myron richardsonii

- Hydrophiinae (Sea snakes)

- Aipysurus

Aipysurus eydouxii (Spine-tailed sea snake)
Aipysurus laevis (Olive sea snake)

- Astrotia stokesii (Stoke's sea snake)
- Disteira

Disteira major (Olive-headed or greater sea snake)
Disteira nigrocincta
Disteira walli (Wall's sea snake)

- Enhydrina schistosa (Beaked sea snake, hook-nosed sea snake, common sea snake, Valakadyn sea snake)
- Enhydrina zweifeli (Sepik or Zweifel’s beaked seasnake)
- Hydrophis

Hydrophis belcheri (Faint-banded sea snake, Belcher's sea snake)
Hydrophis bituberculatus (Peters' sea snake)
Hydrophis brooki
Hydrophis caerulescens (Dwarf sea snake)
Hydrophis cantoris
Hydrophis cyanocinctus (Annulated sea snake, blue-banded sea snake)
Hydrophis elegans (Elegant sea snake)
Hydrophis fasciatus (Striped sea snake)
Hydrophis gracilis (Graceful small-headed sea snake, slender sea snake)
Hydrophis inornatus (Plain sea snake)
Hydrophis klossi (Kloss' sea snake)
Hydrophis lapemoides (Persian Gulf sea snake)
Hydrophis mamillaris (Bombay sea snake)
Hydrophis melanocephalus (Slender-necked sea snake)
Hydrophis obscurus (Russell's sea snake)
Hydrophis ornatus (Ornate reef sea snake)
Hydrophis semperi (Garman's sea snake)
Hydrophis spiralis (Yellow sea snake)
Hydrophis stricticollis (Collared sea snake)
Hydrophis viperinus

- Kerilia jerdonii (Jerdon's sea snake)
- Kolpophis annandalei (Bighead sea snake)
- Lapemis

Lapemis curtus (Shaw's sea snake)
Lapemis hardwickii (Hardwicke's spine-bellied sea snake)

- Laticauda

Laticauda colubrina (Colubrine sea krait, yellow-lipped sea krait)
Laticauda laticaudata (Blue-lipped sea krait)

- Pelamis platurus (Yellowbelly sea snake, pelagic sea snake)
- Thalassophis

Thalassophis anomalus (Anomalous sea snake)

=== Sea turtles ===
- Dermochelyidae

Dermochelys coriacea (leatherback sea turtle)

- Cheloniidae

Caretta caretta (Loggerhead sea turtle)
Lepidochelys kempii (Kemp's ridley)
Lepidochelys olivacea (Olive ridley)
Chelonia mydas (Green sea turtle)
Eretmochelys imbricata (Hawksbill sea turtle)
Natator depressus (Flatback sea turtle)

== Extinct ==
From the Permian to the present day there have been numerous groups of extinct reptiles that adapted to life in the marine realm:

=== Mesosaurs ===
- Mesosauridae: Early Permian

Mesosaurus

=== Phytosaurs ===
- Pseudopalatinae: Late Triassic

Mystriosuchus

=== Squamates ===
- Dolichosauridae: Late Cretaceous

Adriosaurus
Dolichosaurus
Judeasaurus

- Mosasauroidea

- Aigialosauridae

Opetiosaurus
Aigialosaurus
Portunatasaurus

- Mosasauridae

- Kaganaias
- Mosasaurinae

Carinodens
Clidastes
Dallasaurus
Globidens
Kaikaifilu
Mosasaurus
Plotosaurus
Prognathodon
Thalassotitan

- Halisaurinae

Eonatator
Halisaurus

- Tylosaurinae

Hainosaurus
Tylosaurus
Taniwhasaurus

- Plioplatecarpinae

Platecarpus
Plioplatecarpus
Selmasaurus

- Ophidia

- Simoliophiidae: Late Cretaceous

Eupodophis
Haasiophis
Pachyophis
Pachyrhachis

- Palaeophiidae: Late Cretaceous - Eocene

Archaeophis
Palaeophis
Pterosphenus

- Sphenodontia

- Pleurosauridae Early - Late Jurassic (-Early Cretaceous?)

Pleurosaurus
Palaeopleurosaurus
Vadasaurus?
Derasmosaurus?

- Ankylosphenodon

=== Tanysauria ===
- Dinocephalosaurus: Middle Triassic
- Tanystropheus: Middle Triassic

=== Sauropterygians ===
- Placodonts: Triassic

Cyamodus
Henodus
Palatodonta
Paraplacodus
Placochelys
Placodus
Psephoderma
Protenodontosaurus
Glyphoderma
Psephosauriscus
Psephochelys
Pararcus
Parahenodus
Sinocyamodus

- Nothosauroidea: Triassic

- Nothosauridae

Ceresiosaurus
Germanosaurus
Lariosaurus
Nothosaurus
Silvestrosaurus

- Simosauridae

Simosaurus

- Pachypleurosaurs: Triassic

Anarosaurus
Dactylosaurus
Keichousaurus
Neusticosaurus (Pachypleurosaurus)
Dawazisaurus
Diandongosaurus
Dianmeisaurus
Hanosaurus
Honghesaurus
Majiashanosaurus
Panzhousaurus
Qianxisaurus
Wumengosaurus
Dianopachysaurus
Luopingosaurus
Odoiporosaurus
Prosantosaurus
Serpianosaurus
Chusaurus

- Pistosaurus:Middle Triassic
- Plesiosaurs: Early Jurassic - Late Cretaceous

- Plesiosauroids: Early Jurassic - Late Cretaceous
  - Plesiosaurus
  - Cimoliasauridae
  - Cryptoclididae

Cryptoclidus
Microcleidus
Muraenosaurus

- Elasmosauridae

Elasmosaurus
Futabasaurus
Hydrotherosaurus
Kimmerosaurus
Libonectes
Mauisaurus
Morturneria
Thalassomedon
Tuarangisaurus

- Polycotylidae

Dolichorhynchops
Edgarosaurus
Manemergus
Sulcusuchus
Thililua
Trinacromerum

- Pliosaurs: Early Jurassic - Late Cretaceous

Kronosaurus
Liopleurodon
Pliosaurus
Macroplata
Peloneustes
Rhomaleosaurus
Umoonasaurus
Sachicasaurus

=== Ichthyosaurs ===
Ichthyosaurus
Ichthyotitan
Mixosaurus
Ophthalmosaurus
Shastasaurus
Shonisaurus

=== Choristoderes ===
- Champsosaurus
- Simoedosaurus
- ?Pachystropheus (sometimes considered a thalattosaur)
- ?Actiosaurus

=== Crocodylomorphs ===
- Thalattosuchia: Early Jurassic - Early Cretaceous

- Metriorhynchoidea

Eoneustes
Teleidosaurus
Zoneait
Aggiosaurus
Dakosaurus
Enaliosuchus
Geosaurus
Metriorhynchus
Neustosaurus
Purranisaurus
Teleidosaurus

- Teleosauridae

Machimosaurus
Pelagosaurus
Platysuchus
Teleosaurus
Steneosaurus

- Tethysuchia: Middle Jurassic - Early Eocene

- Pholidosauridae: Middle Jurassic - Late Cretaceous

Elosuchus
Oceanosuchus
Terminonaris

- Dyrosauridae: Late Cretaceous - Early Eocene

Arambourgisuchus
Atlantosuchus
Dyrosaurus
Guarinisuchus
Phosphatosaurus
Rhabdognathus

- Gavialoidea: Late Cretaceous - Recent

Eothoracosaurus
Thoracosaurus
Eosuchus
Argochampsa
Eogavialis
Ikanogavialis
Piscogavialis
Siquisiquesuchus
Gryposuchus
Aktiogavialis

=== Testudines ===
- Chelonioidea

Allopleuron
Archelon
Pneumatoarthrus
Protostega

- Araripemydidae

Araripemys

- Bothremydidae

=== Thalattosaurs ===
- Agkistrognathus
- Anshunsaurus
- Askeptosaurus
- Concavispina
- Clarazia
- Endennasaurus
- Gunakadeit
- Hescheleria
- Miodentosaurus
- Nectosaurus
- Paralonectes
- Thalattosaurus
- Wapitisaurus
- Wayaosaurus
- Xinpusaurus
