= Hydrophis sibauensis =

Conservation status
- Data Deficient (IUCN 3.1)

Scientific classification
- Kingdom: Animalia
- Phylum: Chordata
- Class: Reptilia
- Order: Squamata
- Suborder: Serpentes
- Family: Elapidae
- Genus: Hydrophis
- Species: H. sibauensis

Binomial name
- Hydrophis sibauensis Rasmussen, Auliya & Böhme, 2001

Synonyms
- Chitulia sibauensis Kharin, 2005

Species of sea snake

Hydrophis sibauensis, also known as the Kalimantan sea snake, is a species of venomous sea snake in the family Elapidae that is native to Indonesia, and endemic to Borneo. The specific epithet sibauensis refers to the Sibau River. It is notable for being one of only two known species of sea snake that are only found in freshwater, the other species being Hydrophis semperi.

== Behaviour ==
The species is viviparous.

== Distribution and habitat ==
The range of the snake is limited to the Sibau River, a tributary of the Kapuas River, in West Kalimantan, Borneo, in fresh water some 1,000 km upriver from the sea. The type locality is Putussibau.
