= Hydrophis torquatus =

Conservation status
- Data Deficient (IUCN 3.1)

Scientific classification
- Kingdom: Animalia
- Phylum: Chordata
- Class: Reptilia
- Order: Squamata
- Suborder: Serpentes
- Family: Elapidae
- Genus: Hydrophis
- Species: H. torquatus

Binomial name
- Hydrophis torquatus Günther, 1864

Synonyms
- Chitulia torquata Kharin, 2005

Species of sea snake

Hydrophis torquatus, also known as the west coast black-headed sea snake, is a species of venomous sea snake in the family Elapidae that is native to Southeast Asia. The specific epithet torquatus ("collared") refers to the body markings.

== Subspecies ==
- Hydrophis torquatus torquatus (Günther, 1864)
- Hydrophis torquatus diadema (Günther, 1864)
- Hydrophis torquatus aagaardi (Smith, 1920)

== Description ==
The species grows to about 104 cm in length. The upper body is grey or whitish, with a yellow to whitish belly, and with black bands which fade with age. The head is black with a yellowish band on the snout and along the sides.

== Behaviour ==
The species is viviparous.

== Distribution and habitat ==
The range of the snake encompasses the southern South China Sea, the Gulf of Thailand and the Straits of Malacca, including the adjoining coastal waters of the Malay Peninsula, Sumatra and Borneo, as well as the fresh water Tonlé Sap lake in Cambodia.
