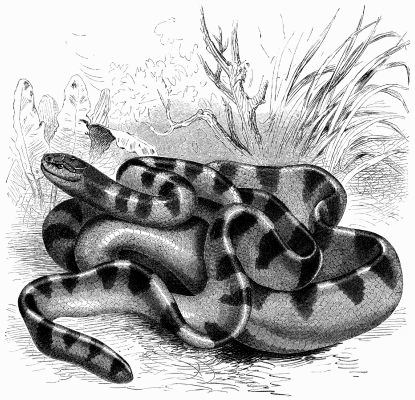
- Annulated sea snake, H. cyanocinctus

Scientific classification
- Kingdom: Animalia
- Phylum: Chordata
- Class: Reptilia
- Order: Squamata
- Suborder: Serpentes
- Family: Elapidae
- Subfamily: Hydrophiinae
- Genus: Hydrophis; Latreille In Sonnini & Latreille, 1801

Type species
- Hydrophis platurus Linnaeus, 1766

Species
- See text

Synonyms
- Disteira Lacépède, 1804

= Hydrophis =

Genus of snakes

Hydrophis is a genus of sea snakes, venomous snakes in the subfamily Hydrophiinae of the family Elapidae. Species in the genus Hydrophis are typically found in Indo-Australian and Southeast Asian waters. Currently, around 36 species are recognized as being valid.

== Systematics and classification ==
There are more than 30 recognized species in the genus.

| Species | Authority | Subsp.* | Common name | Geographic range |
|---|---|---|---|---|
| H. annandalei | (Laidlaw, 1901) | 0 | bighead sea snake, Annandale's sea snake | Indian Ocean |
| H. anomalus | P. Schmidt, 1852 | 0 | anomalous sea snake | South Chinese Sea, Indian Ocean |
| H. atriceps | Günther, 1864 | 0 | black-headed sea snake | |
| H. belcheri | (Gray, 1849) | 0 | Belcher's sea snake | Queensland and New Territories, Australia |
| H. bituberculatus | W. Peters, 1873 | 0 | Peters' sea snake | Indian Ocean (Sri Lanka, Thailand) |
| H. brookii | Günther, 1872 | 0 | Brooke's sea snake | |
| H. caerulescens | (Shaw, 1802) | 2 | dwarf sea snake | Queensland, Australia |
| H. cantoris | Günther, 1864 | 0 | Cantor's narrow-headed sea snake, Cantor's small-headed sea snake | |
| H. coggeri | (Kharin, 1984) | 0 | slender-necked sea snake, Cogger's sea snake | Western Australia |
| H. curtus | (Shaw, 1802) | 0 | Shaw's sea snake, short sea snake, Hardwicke's sea snake, spine-bellied sea snake | |
| H. cyanocinctus | Daudin, 1803 | 0 | annulated sea snake, blue-banded sea snake | |
| H. czeblukovi | (Kharin, 1984) | 0 | fine-spined sea snake | |
| H. donaldi | Ukuwela, Sanders & Fry, 2012 | | rough-scaled sea snake | Northern Australia |
| H. elegans | (Gray, 1842) | 0 | elegant sea snake | |
| H. fasciatus | (Schneider, 1799) | 0 | striped sea snake | |
| H. hardwickii | (Gray, 1834) | 0 | Hardwicke's spine-bellied sea snake | |
| H. inornatus | (Gray, 1849) | 0 | plain sea snake | Western Australia |
| H. jerdonii | (Gray, 1849) | 2 | Jerdon's sea snake | Indian Ocean |
| H. kingii | Boulenger, 1896 | 0 | King's sea snake | |
| H. klossi | Boulenger, 1912 | 0 | Kloss' sea snake | |
| H. laboutei | Rasmussen & Ineich, 2000 | 0 | Laboute's sea snake | New Caledonia |
| H. lamberti | M.A. Smith, 1917 | 0 | Lambert's sea snake | |
| H. lapemoides | (Gray, 1849) | 0 | Persian Gulf sea snake | |
| H. macdowelli | Kharin, 1983 | 0 | small-headed sea snake, McDowell's sea snake | Western Australia |
| H. major | (Shaw, 1802) | 0 | greater sea snake, olive-headed sea snake | |
| H. mamillaris | (Daudin, 1803) | 0 | Bombay sea snake | |
| H. melanocephalus | Gray, 1849 | 0 | slender-necked sea snake | |
| H. melanosoma | Günther, 1864 | 0 | black-banded robust sea snake | |
| H. nigrocinctus | Daudin, 1803 | 0 | black-banded sea snake | Sunderbans,(Bangladesh, India) |
| H. obscurus | Daudin, 1803 | 0 | estuarine sea snake, Russel's sea snake | |
| H. ocellatus | (Gray, 1849) | 0 | spotted sea snake | |
| H. ornatus | (Gray, 1842) | 4 | ornate reef sea snake | |
| H. pacificus | Boulenger, 1896 | 0 | large-headed sea snake | |
| H. parviceps | M.A. Smith, 1935 | 0 | Smith's small-headed sea snake | |
| H. peronii | (A.M.C. Duméril, 1853) | 0 | Peron's sea snake | |
| H. platurus | Linnaeus, 1766 | 0 | yellow-bellied sea snake | |
| H. schistosus | Daudin, 1803 | 0 | beaked sea snake | Indian Ocean and Persian Gulf to Pacific Ocean |
| H. semperi | Garman, 1881 | 0 | Lake Taal snake, Garman's sea snake, Philippine freshwater sea snake, Luzon sea snake | |
| H. sibauensis | A. Rasmussen, Auliya & W. Böhme, 2001 | 0 | Kalimantan sea snake | |
| H. spiralis | (Shaw, 1802) | 0 | yellow sea snake | |
| H. stokesii | (Gray, 1846) | 0 | Stokes' sea snake, Stokes's sea snake | |
| H. stricticollis | Günther, 1864 | 0 | collared sea snake | |
| H. torquatus | Günther, 1864 | 2 | west coast black-headed sea snake | |
| H. viperinus | P. Schmidt, 1852 | 0 | viperine sea snake | Persian Gulf and Western Indian Ocean to Western Pacific Ocean |
| H. vorisi | Kharin, 1984 | 0 | estuarine sea snake | Torres Strait, Queensland |
| H. zweifeli | (Kharin, 1985) | 0 | Sepik beaked sea snake, Zweifel's beaked sea snake | |

*) Not including the nominate subspecies (typical form).

Nota bene: A binomial authority in parentheses indicates that the species was originally described in a genus other than Hydrophis.

== See also ==
- Sea snake
- Snakebite
