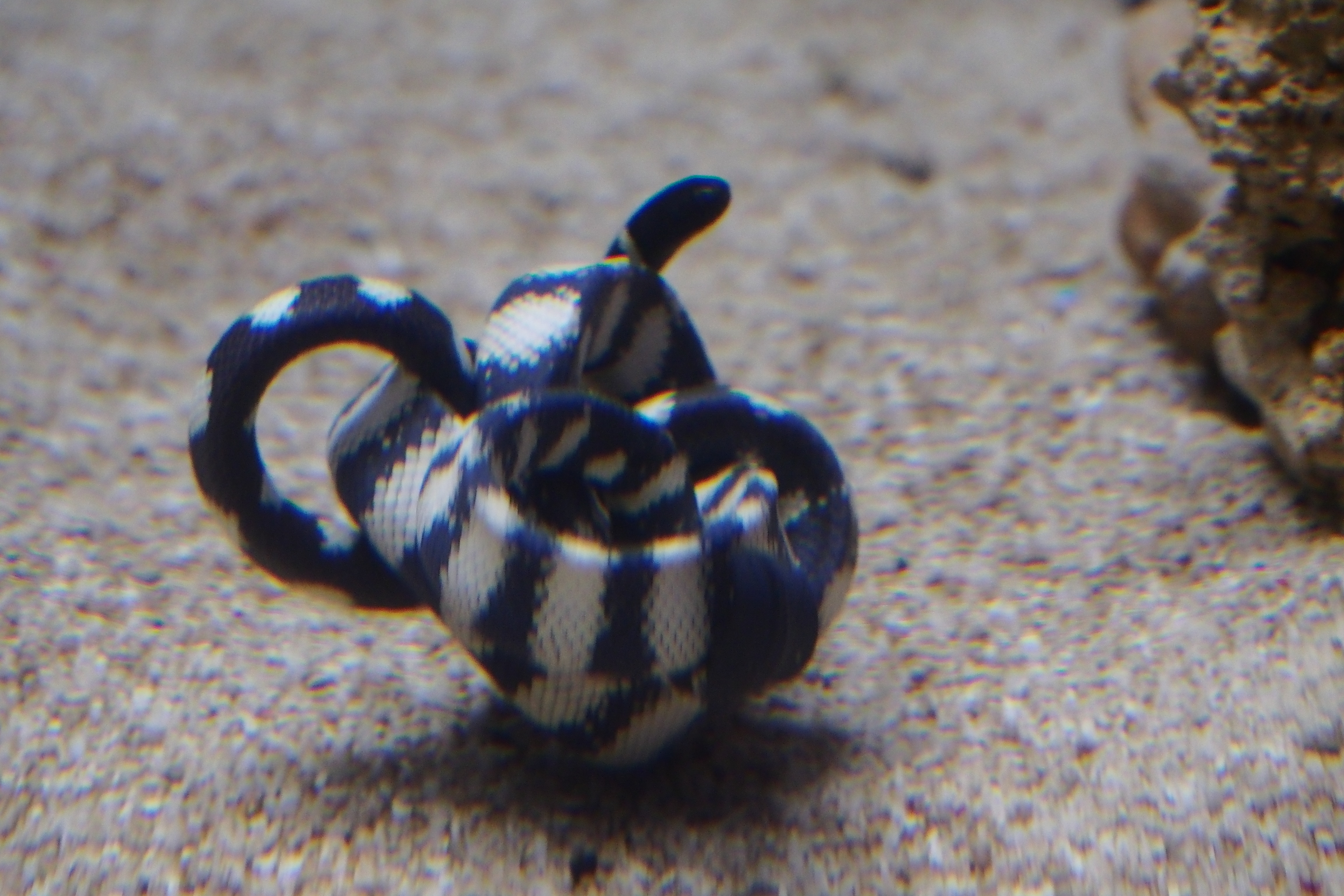

Conservation status
- Data Deficient (IUCN 3.1)

Scientific classification
- Kingdom: Animalia
- Phylum: Chordata
- Class: Reptilia
- Order: Squamata
- Suborder: Serpentes
- Family: Elapidae
- Genus: Hydrophis
- Species: H. melanocephalus

Binomial name
- Hydrophis melanocephalus Gray, 1849

Synonyms
- Hydrophis sublævis Var. melanocephala Gray, 1849; Hydrophis melanocephalus; Boulenger, 1896; Microcephalophis melanocephalus - Stejneger, 1898; Disteira melanocephala; Stejneger, 1907; Leioselasma melanocephala - Welch, 1994

= Hydrophis melanocephalus =

Species of snake

Hydrophis melanocephalus, commonly known as the slender-necked sea snake, is a species of venomous sea snake in the family Elapidae.

== Geographic range ==
- South China Sea, Jeju Island, Korea.
- Japan (Ryūkyū, Hokkaidō, Kochi).
- Coasts of Taiwan and Guangdong northward to Zhejiang (China).
- Australia (North Territory?, Western Australia), New Guinea.

== Description ==
Head black dorsally and ventrally, with a yellowish bar on the prefrontals, and with a yellowish streak behind the eye on the postocular and upper portion of last upper labial. Anterior part of body black dorsally and ventrally, with yellow crossbars on the dorsum. Posterior part of body olive dorsally and yellow ventrally, with black rings, which are broader on the dorsum.

The type specimen, a female, is 107 cm (42 in) in total length, with a tail 8.5 cm (3 1/4 in) long.

All dorsal scales rhomboidal and imbricate (overlapping). Dorsal scales on neck smooth, arranged in 25 rows. Dorsal scales on body with a short keel or small tubercle, in 35 rows. Ventrals 329.

The head very small and the body long, very slender anteriorly. Rostral slightly broader than deep. Frontal nearly twice as long as broad, as long as its distance from the rostral, slightly shorter than the parietals. One preocular and one postocular. A single anterior temporal. Seven or eight upper labials, second largest and in contact with the prefrontal, third and fourth (or third, fourth, and fifth) entering the eye. There are two pairs of small chin shields, in contact with each other. The tail is laterally flattened and oar-like.
