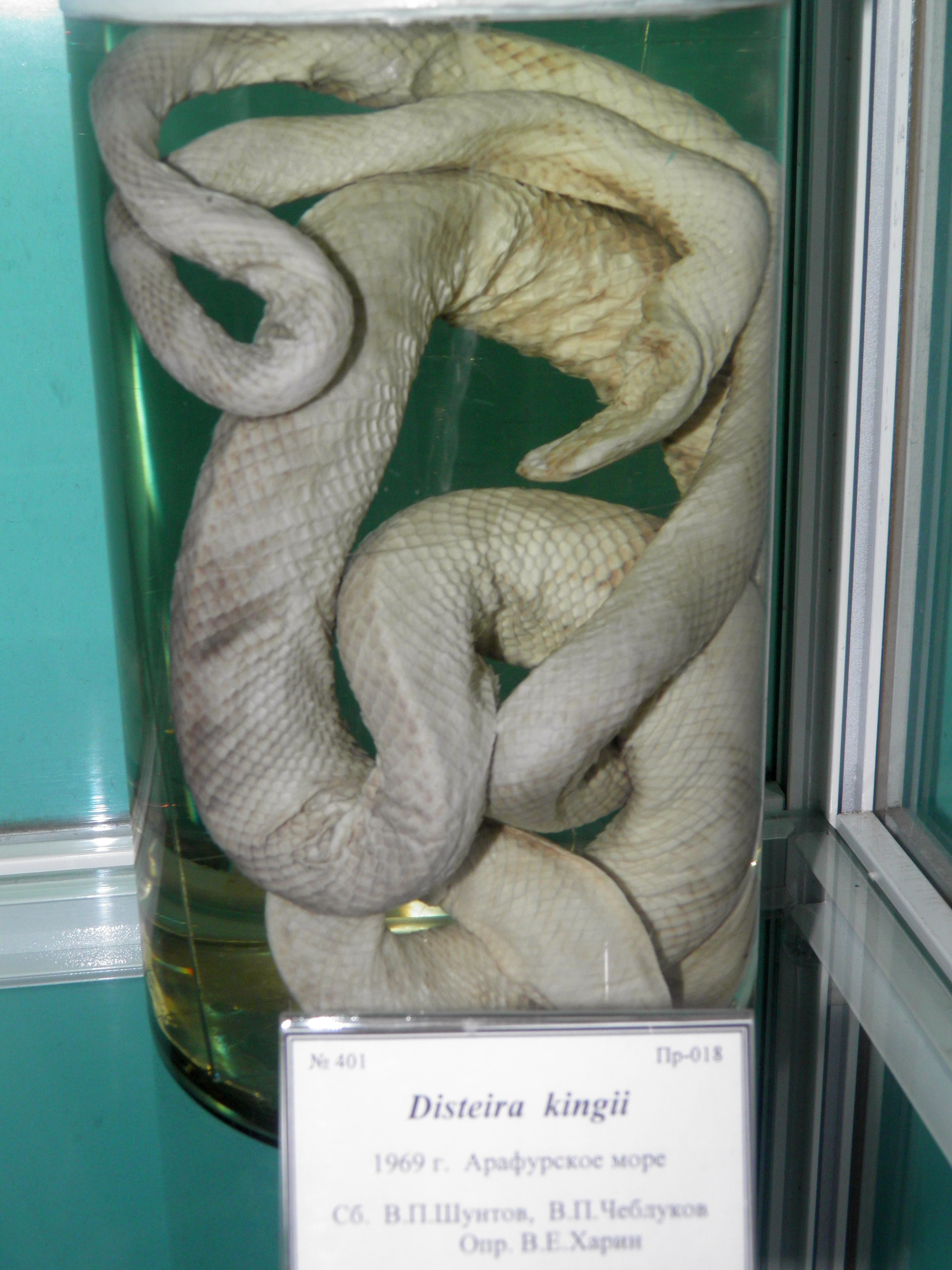

Conservation status
- Least Concern (IUCN 3.1)

Scientific classification
- Kingdom: Animalia
- Phylum: Chordata
- Class: Reptilia
- Order: Squamata
- Suborder: Serpentes
- Family: Elapidae
- Genus: Hydrophis
- Species: H. kingii

Binomial name
- Hydrophis kingii Boulenger, 1896

Synonyms
- Disteira kingii (Boulenger, 1896)

= Spectacled sea snake =

Species of snake

The spectacled sea snake (Hydrophis kingii), also known commonly as King's sea snake, is species of venomous sea snake in the family Elapidae. The species is native to waters off northern Australia and the southern coast of New Guinea.

== Etymology ==
The specific name, kingii, is in honor of Australian marine surveyor Philip Parker King.

== Description ==
H. kingii usually attains a total length (including tail) of not more than 1.9 m (6.2 ft). The head is black, and a there is a white ring around the eye. The anterior chin shields are in contact with the mental groove. The dorsal scales are keeled, and overlapping.

== Habitat ==
The preferred natural habitat of H. kingii is marine waters, to a depth of 22 m (72 ft), with a muddy or sandy bottom.

== Diet ==
H. kingii preys upon small fishes.

== Reproduction ==
H. kingii is ovoviviparous.

== Venom ==
H. kingii is dangerously venomous.
