= Hydrophis cantoris =

Conservation status
- Data Deficient (IUCN 3.1)

Scientific classification
- Kingdom: Animalia
- Phylum: Chordata
- Class: Reptilia
- Order: Squamata
- Suborder: Serpentes
- Family: Elapidae
- Genus: Hydrophis
- Species: H. cantoris

Binomial name
- Hydrophis cantoris Günther, 1864

Synonyms
- Hydrophis cantoris Günther, 1864; Distera gillespiae Boulenger, 1899; Microcephalophis cantoris — Wall, 1921; Hydrophis (Microcephalophis) cantoris — Kharin, 2004

Species of snake

Hydrophis cantoris, also known commonly as Cantor's narrow-headed sea snake and Cantor's small-headed sea snake, is a species of venomous sea snake in the family Elapidae.

== Etymology ==
The specific name, cantoris, is in honor of Danish zoologist Theodore Edward Cantor.

== Description ==
H.cantoris has the following diagnostic characters: Head small, body long and slender anteriorly; scales on thickest part of body juxtaposed; 5-6 maxillary teeth behind fangs; 23-25 (rarely 21) dorsal scale rows at neck, 41–48 at thickest part of body (increase from neck to midbody 18–24); ventrals divided by a longitudinal fissure; prefrontal in contact with third upper labial; ventrals 404–468.

The maximum recorded total length (including tail) of males is 1,450 mm (57 in), and of females is 1,880 mm (74 in). The maximum tail length of males is 120 mm (4.7 in), and of females is 140 mm (5.5 in).

== Geographic range ==
Indian Ocean (Bangladesh, Pakistan, India, Myanmar (= Burma), Thailand, Malaysia), Andaman Islands.

== Habitat ==
The preferred natural habitat of H. cantoris is the marine neritic zone, at depths of 20 m (66 ft) or less.

== Reproduction ==
H. cantoris is viviparous.
