= Hydrophis laboutei =

Conservation status
- Data Deficient (IUCN 3.1)

Scientific classification
- Kingdom: Animalia
- Phylum: Chordata
- Class: Reptilia
- Order: Squamata
- Suborder: Serpentes
- Family: Elapidae
- Genus: Hydrophis
- Species: H. laboutei

Binomial name
- Hydrophis laboutei Rasmussen & Ineich, 2000

Synonyms
- Chitulia laboutei (Rasmussen & Ineich, 2000)

Species of sea snake

Hydrophis laboutei, also known commonly as Laboute's sea snake, is a species of venomous sea snake in the subfamily Hydrophiinae of the family Elapidae. The species is native to New Caledonia.

== Etymology ==
The specific epithet, laboutei, honours Pierre Laboute, a French researcher at the IRD station in Nouméa, who collected the holotype.

== Description ==
H. laboutei has 44–46 rows of dorsal scales at midbody, and it has 186–187 vertebrae.

== Geographic range ==
H. laboutei is found in the marine waters of New Caledonia. The type locality is the Chesterfield Islands in the Coral Sea.

== Habitat ==
Other than being marine, the precise habitat of H. laboutei is unknown. The holotype was collected with a trawl at a depth of 62 m (203 ft).

== Reproduction ==
H. laboutei is ovoviviparous.
