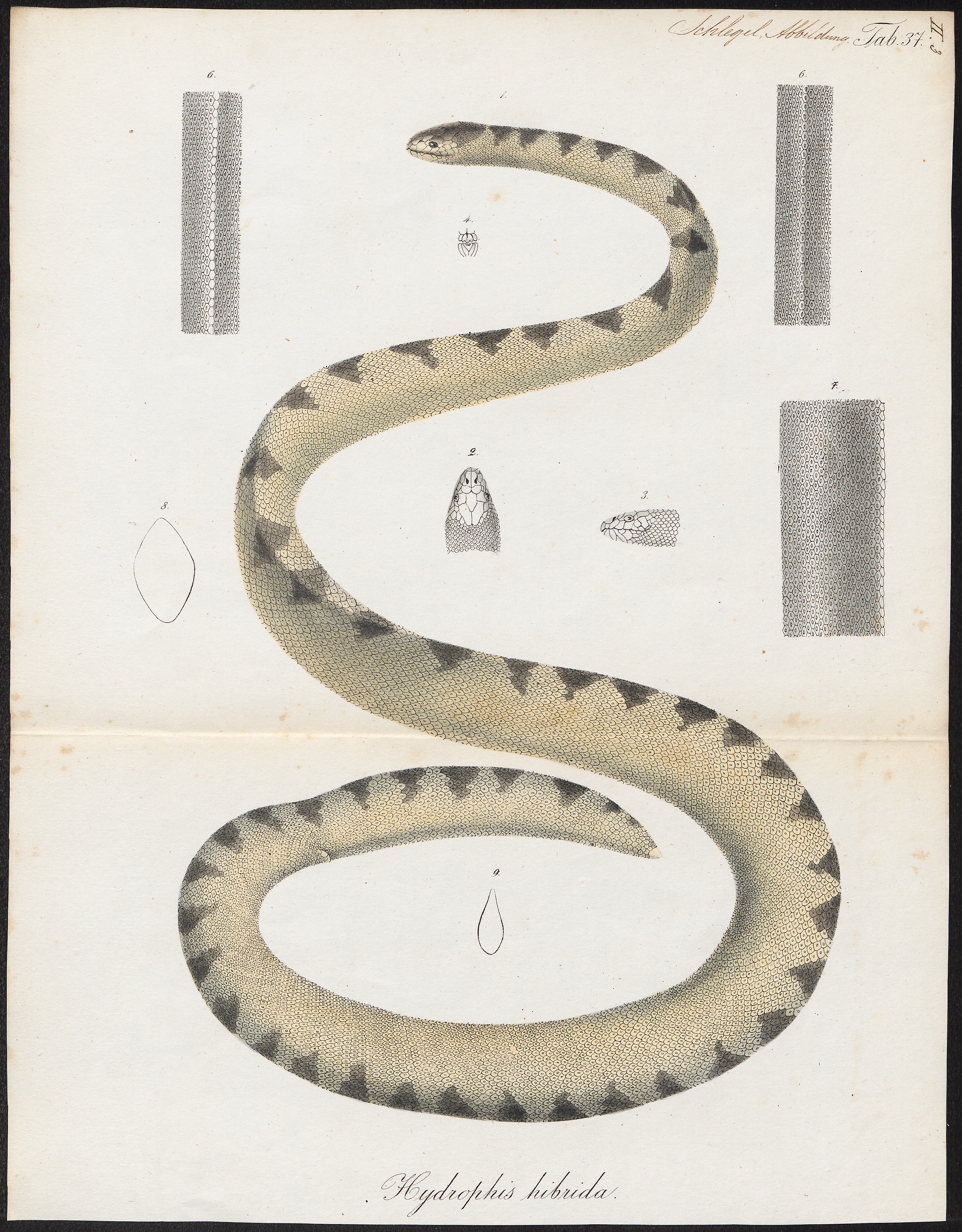

Conservation status
- Least Concern (IUCN 3.1)

Scientific classification
- Kingdom: Animalia
- Phylum: Chordata
- Class: Reptilia
- Order: Squamata
- Suborder: Serpentes
- Family: Elapidae
- Genus: Hydrophis
- Species: H. caerulescens

Binomial name
- Hydrophis caerulescens (Shaw, 1802)

Synonyms
- Hydrus cærulescens Shaw, 1802; Hydrophis cærulescens; Gray, 1842; Polyodontognathus cærulescens - Wall, 1921; Aturia caerulescens; Welch, 1994; Polyodontognathus caerulescens - Kharin, 2005

= Hydrophis caerulescens =

Species of snake

Hydrophis caerulescens, commonly known as the dwarf sea snake, is a species of venomous sea snake in the family Elapidae.

== Geographic range ==
Indian Ocean (Pakistan, India, Bangladesh, Myanmar (Burma), Thailand, W Indonesia, Malaysia), Coasts of Shandong and Guangdong (China), South China Sea, Australia (Queensland), New Caledonia/Loyalty Islands.

== Description ==
The dwarf sea snake is bluish or grayish blue dorsally, merging to yellowish ventrally, with 35–58 deep bluish-black crossbands. The crossbands are as wide or wider than the interspaces, well defined in younger specimens, but obscure in older specimens. The head is black, and in juveniles may also have a yellowish horseshoe-shaped mark.

Adults may attain a total length of 74 cm (2 ft 5 in).

The dorsal scales are arranged in 38–54 rows at midbody (31–43 rows on the neck). Ventrals 253–334.

Each hollow poison fang is followed by a series of 14–18 solid maxillary teeth. The dorsal scales on the thickest part of the body are quadrangular or hexagonal in shape, feebly imbricate (overlapping) or juxtaposed. The ventrals are almost twice as large as the adjacent body scales.

Head very small. Anterior part of body very slender, its diameter about one third the diameter of the posterior part. Rostral broader than deep. Frontal longer than broad, shorter than its distance from the rostral, much shorter than the parietals. One preocular, and one post ocular. Two superposed anterior temporals. Seven upper labials, the third and fourth entering the eye. Chin shields very small, the posterior pair separated by scales. Ventrals distinct throughout the entire body length.
