= Estuarine sea snake =

Conservation status
- Data Deficient (IUCN 3.1)

Scientific classification
- Kingdom: Animalia
- Phylum: Chordata
- Class: Reptilia
- Order: Squamata
- Suborder: Serpentes
- Family: Elapidae
- Genus: Hydrophis
- Species: H. vorisi

Binomial name
- Hydrophis vorisi Kharin, 1984

Species of snake

The estuarine sea snake (Hydrophis vorisi), also known commonly as Kharin's sea snake, is a species of marine venomous snake in the family Elapidae. The species is native to waters around the northern tip of Australia in the Torres Strait.

== Etymology ==
The specific name, vorisi, is in honor of American herpetologist Harold Knight Voris (born 1940).

== Habitat ==
The preferred natural habitat of H. vorisi is the neritic zone.

== Reproduction ==
H. vorisi is viviparous.
