= Large-headed sea snake =

Conservation status
- Near Threatened (IUCN 3.1)

Scientific classification
- Domain: Eukaryota
- Kingdom: Animalia
- Phylum: Chordata
- Class: Reptilia
- Order: Squamata
- Suborder: Serpentes
- Family: Elapidae
- Genus: Hydrophis
- Species: H. pacificus

Binomial name
- Hydrophis pacificus (Boulenger, 1896)

Species of snake

The large-headed sea snake (Hydrophis pacificus) is sea snake in the family Elapidae native to waters off northern Australia.
