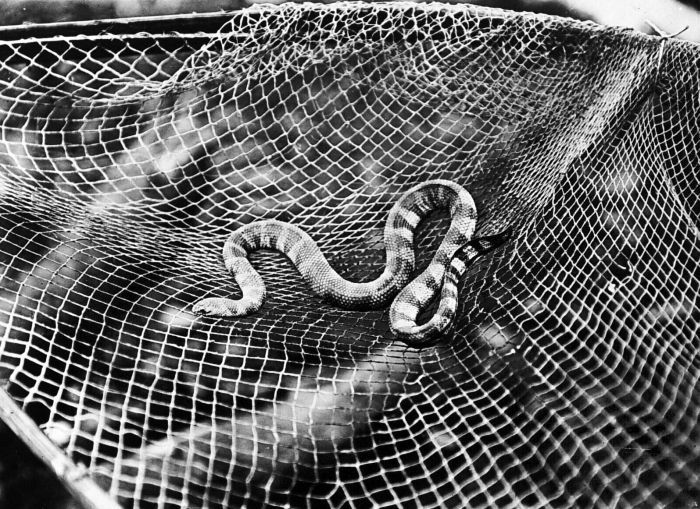

Conservation status
- Data Deficient (IUCN 3.1)

Scientific classification
- Domain: Eukaryota
- Kingdom: Animalia
- Phylum: Chordata
- Class: Reptilia
- Order: Squamata
- Suborder: Serpentes
- Family: Elapidae
- Genus: Hydrophis
- Species: H. anomalus

Binomial name
- Hydrophis anomalus (Schmidt, 1852)

Synonyms
- Thalassophis anomalus

= Hydrophis anomalus =

Species of snake

The anomalous sea snake (Hydrophis anomalus) is a species of sea snake. Its distribution includes the South Chinese Sea (Malaysia, Gulf of Thailand), and the Indian Ocean (Sumatra, Java, Borneo).
