= Hydrophis obscurus =

Conservation status
- Least Concern (IUCN 3.1)

Scientific classification
- Kingdom: Animalia
- Phylum: Chordata
- Class: Reptilia
- Order: Squamata
- Suborder: Serpentes
- Family: Elapidae
- Genus: Hydrophis
- Species: H. obscurus

Binomial name
- Hydrophis obscurus Daudin, 1803

Species of snake

Hydrophis obscurus, commonly known as Russell's sea snake, is a species of venomous sea snake in the family Elapidae.

== Distribution ==
This species is found in the Indian Ocean (India, Myanmar [formerly Burma], Bangladesh) and Thailand. It may also be found in Sri Lanka.
