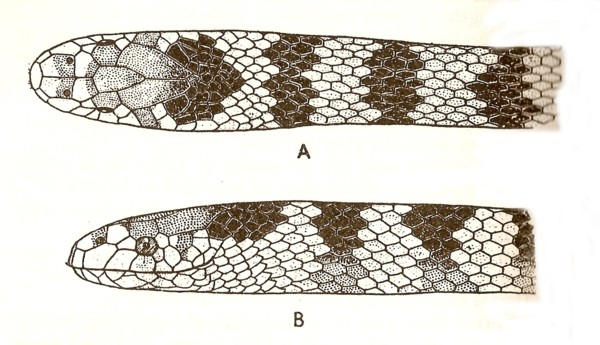

Conservation status
- Least Concern (IUCN 3.1)

Scientific classification
- Kingdom: Animalia
- Phylum: Chordata
- Class: Reptilia
- Order: Squamata
- Suborder: Serpentes
- Family: Elapidae
- Genus: Hydrophis
- Species: H. cyanocinctus

Binomial name
- Hydrophis cyanocinctus Daudin, 1803

Synonyms
- Distira cyanocincta - F. Werner, 1895; Leioselasma cyanocincta - Wall, 1921

= Hydrophis cyanocinctus =

Species of snake

Hydrophis cyanocinctus, commonly called the annulated sea snake or the blue-banded sea snake, is a species of venomous sea snake in the family Elapidae.

== Description ==
Head moderate. Diameter of eye less than its distance from the mouth in the adult. Rostral slightly more broad than deep. Nasals shorter than the frontal, more than twice as long as the suture between the prefrontals. Prefrontals usually in contact with the second upper labial. Frontal more long than broad, as long as its distance from the rostral or the tip of the snout. One preocular and two postoculars. Two superposed anterior temporals. Seven or eight upper labials; third, fourth, and usually fifth entering the eye. Both pairs of chin-shields in contact, or posterior pair separated by one scale.

Body long. Dorsal scales subimbricate, keeled or with two or three tubercles, in 39-45 rows (27-33 anteriorly). Ventrals 281–385, smooth or with two or more tubercles.

Greenish-olive above, with blackish or olive transverse bars or annuli, broadest on the back, sometimes connected by a black band along the belly; or yellowish, with a black vertebral band and a few black bars on the neck.

Length of head and body 1,360 mm (54 in); tail 140 mm (5.5 in).

In a 2019 study it has been found it uses a complex system of blood vessels in its head called, the Modified Cephalic Vascular Network (MCVN) which is an adaptation that helps provide the brain with extra oxygen from water when submerged.

== Distribution ==
Found in the Indian Ocean (From the Persian Gulf, Iran, Pakistan, India, Sri Lanka, Bangladesh, Myanmar, Thailand, Malaysia, Philippines: Visayan Sea, Panay) and the marine waters around Korea, Japan, Solomon Islands, South China Sea (including Hainan), East China Sea (including Taiwan), coastal regions of Shandong and Liaoning (China) coasts of Persian Gulf (Oman, United Arab Emirates), east through South Asia until New Guinea. It is also reported from Brunei

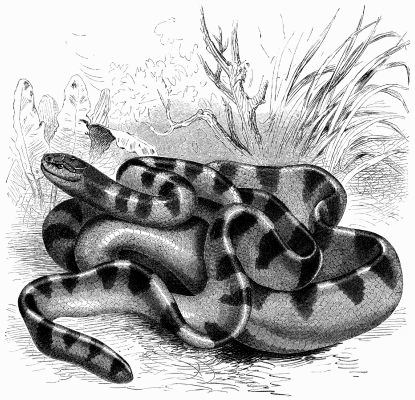
H. cyanocinctus

== Behavior ==
Hydrophis cyanocinctus inhabits shallow coastal waters. It is often accidentally caught by prawn trawlers.

== Diet ==
It feeds on marine invertebrates and also on various groups of fish such as eels and gobies.

== Reproduction ==
This species is ovoviviparous. The young are born alive in broods of 3–16. The newborns are about 38 centimetres (15 in) long.

== Antimicrobial peptide ==
Vipericidin, a protein of 187 amino acids synthesized by H. cyanocinctus, is the precursor of a cathelicidin, a type of antimicrobial peptide (AMP). The peptide, Hc-CATH, consists of 30 amino acids derived from cleavage of vipericidin. Hc-CATH mainly assumes an amphipathic alpha-helical conformation typical of vertebrate AMPs, with the hydrophobic amino acids concentrated on one side of the helix and the hydrophilic cationic amino acids on the other; this conformation is universal for cationic linear AMPs. The high positive charge and the typical amphipathic alpha-helical conformation of Hc-CATH may be responsible for its potent antimicrobial activity.

Hc-CATH is apparently present in the venom gland, spleen, lung, and skin. Gene-encoded AMPs represent the main component of an innate immune system that protects snakes from microbial infections. Sea snakes inhabit an ecological niche that differs from that of terrestrial snakes, and encounter distinct pathogens. The innate immune system of sea snakes apparently enables them to resist both terrestrial and marine pathogens.

== See also ==
- Yellow-bellied sea snake
