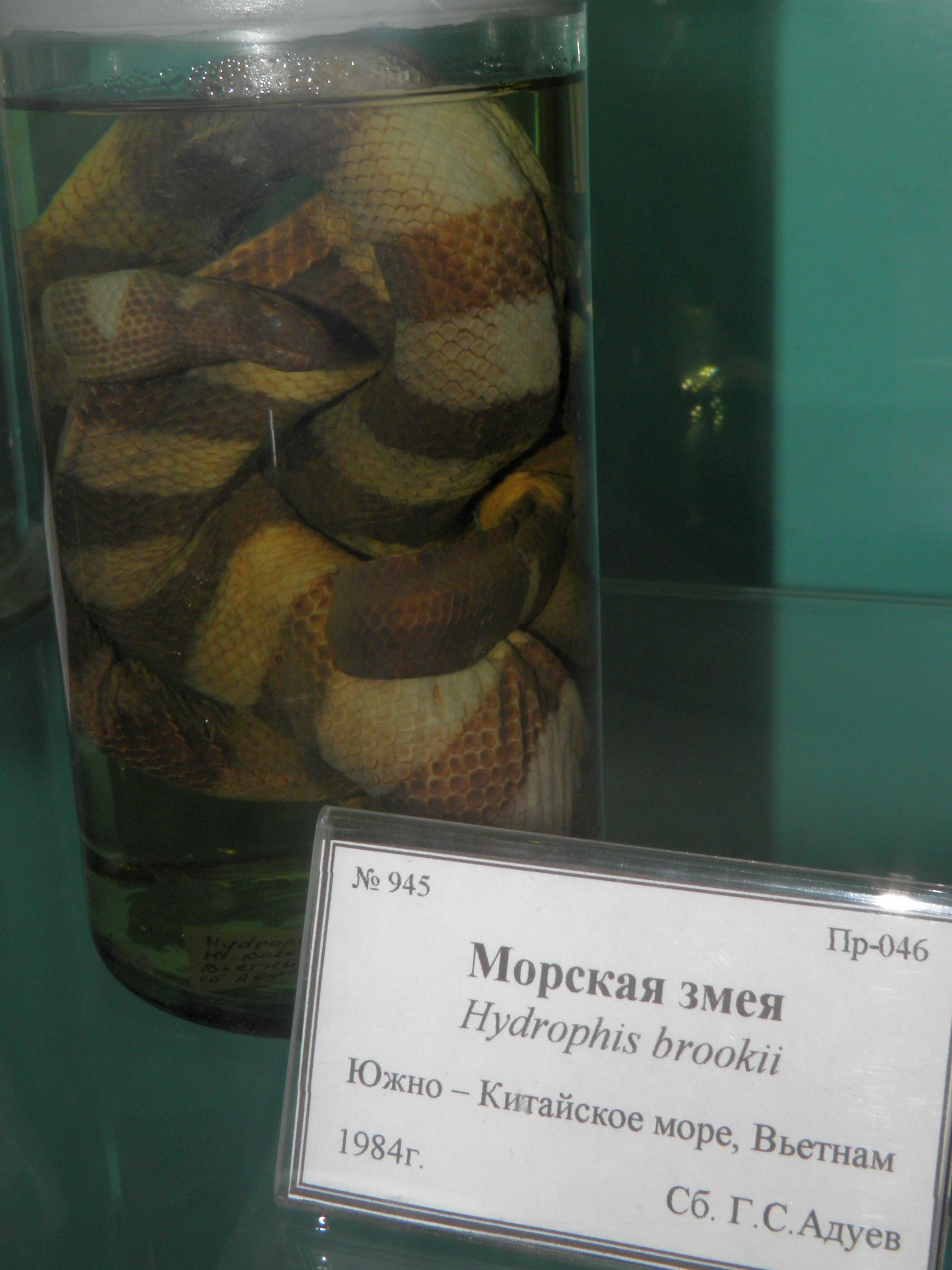

Conservation status
- Least Concern (IUCN 3.1)

Scientific classification
- Kingdom: Animalia
- Phylum: Chordata
- Class: Reptilia
- Order: Squamata
- Suborder: Serpentes
- Family: Elapidae
- Genus: Hydrophis
- Species: H. brookii

Binomial name
- Hydrophis brookii Günther, 1872

Synonyms
- Hydrophis brookii Günther, 1872; Hydrophis consobrinus M.A. Smith, 1917; Hydrophis brookei [sic] — de Rooij, 1917; Hydrophis brooki [sic] — Pyron & Burbrink, 2013; Hydrophis brookii — Wallach, K. Williams & Boundy, 2014

= Hydrophis brooki =

Hydrophis brookii

Species of snake

Hydrophis brookii is a species of venomous sea snake in the subfamily Hydrophiinae of the family Elapidae. The species is native to bodies of water in Southeast Asia.

== Etymology ==
The specific name, brookii, is in honor of British adventurer James Brooke, who became the first White Rajah of Sarawak.

== Geographic range ==
H. brookii is found in the Indian Ocean (Malaysia, Vietnam, western Indonesia: Sumatra, Java, Kalimantan) and the Gulf of Thailand. It is also found in a freshwater lake in Thailand.

== Description ==
Males of H. brookii may attain a total length of 103.5 cm (40.7 in), which includes a tail 11.5 cm (4.5 in) long. Females are slightly smaller, and may attain a total length of 96.5 cm (38.0 in), with a tail 7.5 cm (3.0 in) long.

== Diet ==
H. brookii predominately preys upon eels.

== Reproduction ==
H. brookii is viviparous.
