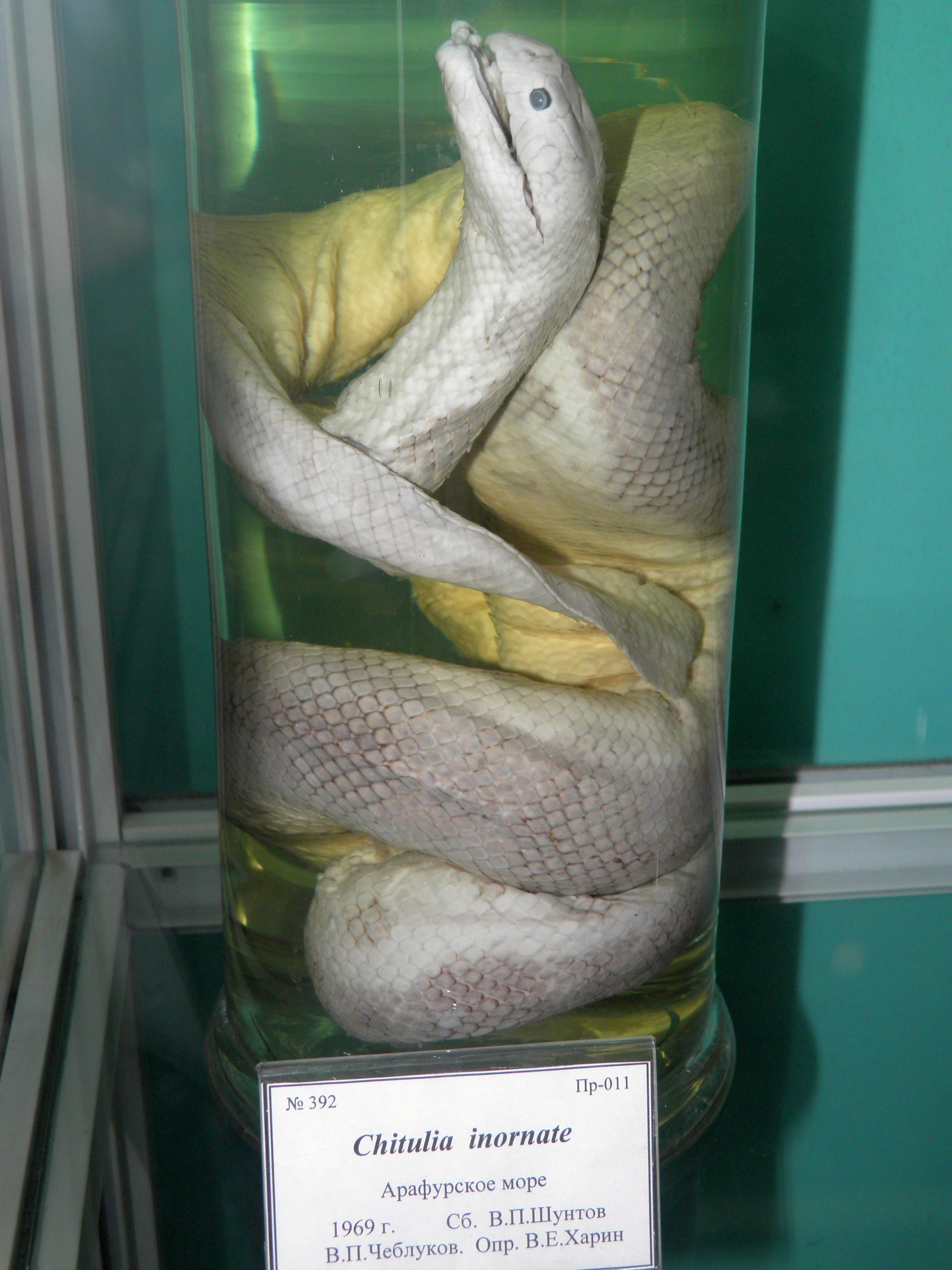

Conservation status
- Data Deficient (IUCN 3.1)

Scientific classification
- Kingdom: Animalia
- Phylum: Chordata
- Class: Reptilia
- Order: Squamata
- Suborder: Serpentes
- Family: Elapidae
- Genus: Hydrophis
- Species: H. inornatus

Binomial name
- Hydrophis inornatus (Gray, 1849)

Synonyms
- Chitulia inornata Gray, 1849; Hydrophis inornatus; Cogger, 1983; Aturia inornata; Welch, 1994

= Hydrophis inornatus =

Species of snake

Hydrophis inornatus, commonly known as the plain sea snake, is a species of venomous sea snake in the family Elapidae.

== Distribution ==
South China Sea (Philippines: Panay, etc.), Sri Lanka, Australia (North Territory, Western Australia?).

== Description ==
Hydrophis inornatus is bluish gray dorsally. The lips, lower sides, and venter are white. The tail is dark bluish gray, with three or four narrow white crossbands.

Head elongate, snout somewhat flattened. Eye large, located above the fourth upper labial. Pupil round. Neck moderately thick.

Dorsal scales hexagonal, with a central keel.

Ventrals distinct, but only slightly larger than the contiguous scales. The type specimen, a male, has 240 ventrals.
