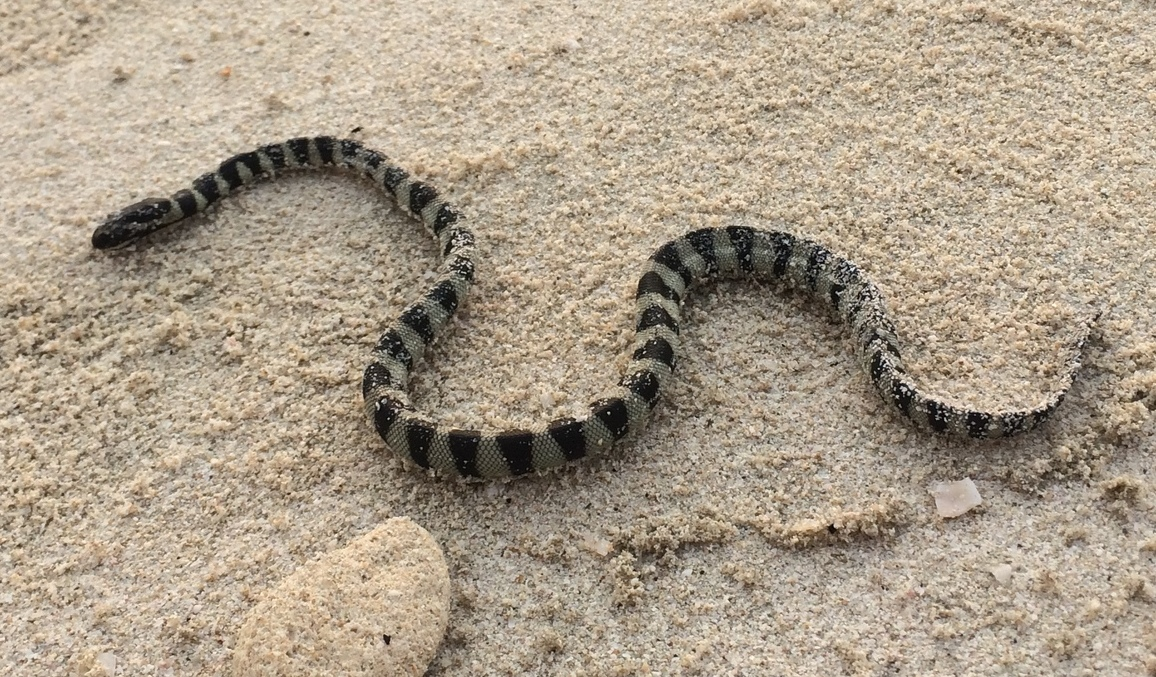
- Hydrophis lapemoides in Sharjah, United Arab Emirates

Conservation status
- Least Concern (IUCN 3.1)

Scientific classification
- Domain: Eukaryota
- Kingdom: Animalia
- Phylum: Chordata
- Class: Reptilia
- Order: Squamata
- Suborder: Serpentes
- Family: Elapidae
- Genus: Hydrophis
- Species: H. lapemoides

Binomial name
- Hydrophis lapemoides (JE Gray, 1849)

= Hydrophis lapemoides =

Species of snake

Hydrophis lapemoides is a species of snake in the family Elapidae known commonly as the Persian Gulf sea snake. This sea snake is native to the Indian Ocean from the Persian Gulf to the coasts of Thailand.

== Distribution ==
This species occurs along the coasts of Bahrain, Bangladesh, India, Iran, Iraq, Kuwait, Malaysia, Myanmar, Oman, Pakistan, Qatar, Saudi Arabia, Singapore, Sri Lanka, Thailand and the United Arab Emirates.

== Description ==
The adult can reach 110 centimeters in length. The body is yellow, olive, or gray in color, paler on the sides and belly, with olive to black banding. The juvenile has a yellow mark on the head. The tail is flattened.

== Biology ==
This snake feeds on fish. It is sometimes caught as bycatch in fishing operations. It is a marine species but it can enter and dwell in freshwater bodies for extended periods of time. It is a venomous species. This is a common and widespread species, but little is known about its biology. During the mating season for this species it is not uncommon for sailors to see thousands of Hydrophis lapemoides sea snakes on the surface of the sea. Where Dolphin pods are seen, these masses of sea snakes are not noted, and it is suspected that the Dolphin is a natural predator of H. lapemoides.

== Bibliography ==
- Bussarawitt, S., Rasmussen, A. R., & Andersen, M. 1989. A preliminary study on sea snakes (Hydrophiidae) from Phuket Harbor, Phuket Island, Thailand. Nat. Hist. Bull. Siam Soc., Bangkok 37(2): 209–225.
- Rasmussen, A. R. 1993. The status of the Persian Gulf sea snake Hydrophis lapemoides (Gray 1849) (Serpentes: Hydrophiidae) [includes a redescription]. Bull. nat. Hist. Mus. Lond. (zool.) 59(2): 97–105.
