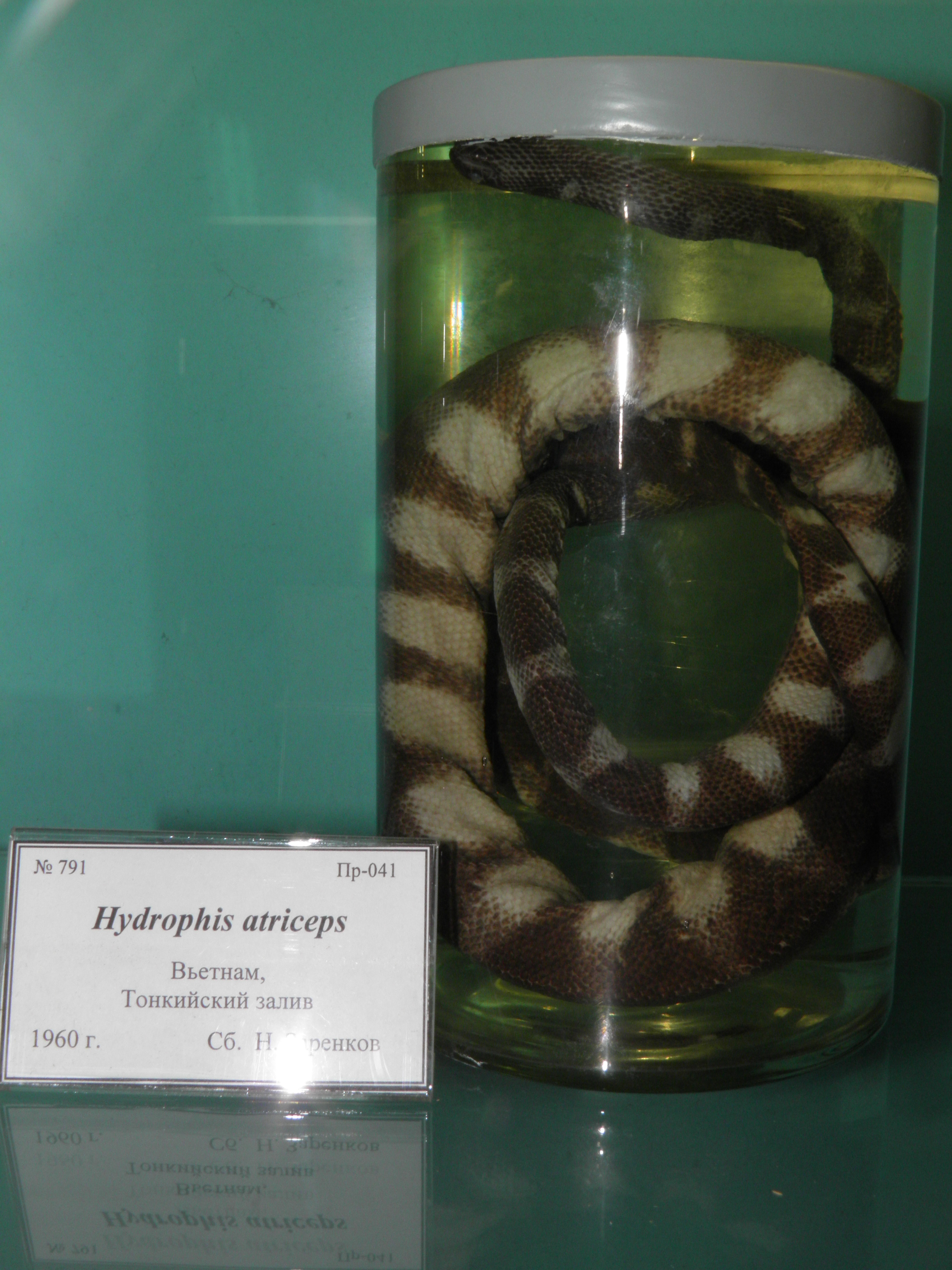

Conservation status
- Least Concern (IUCN 3.1)

Scientific classification
- Kingdom: Animalia
- Phylum: Chordata
- Class: Reptilia
- Order: Squamata
- Suborder: Serpentes
- Family: Elapidae
- Genus: Hydrophis
- Species: H. atriceps

Binomial name
- Hydrophis atriceps Günther, 1864

= Black-headed sea snake =

Species of snake

The black-headed sea snake (Hydrophis atriceps) is a marine snake native to waters around Thailand, Vietnam, Singapore, Indonesia, the Philippines and northern Australia, and New Guinea.
