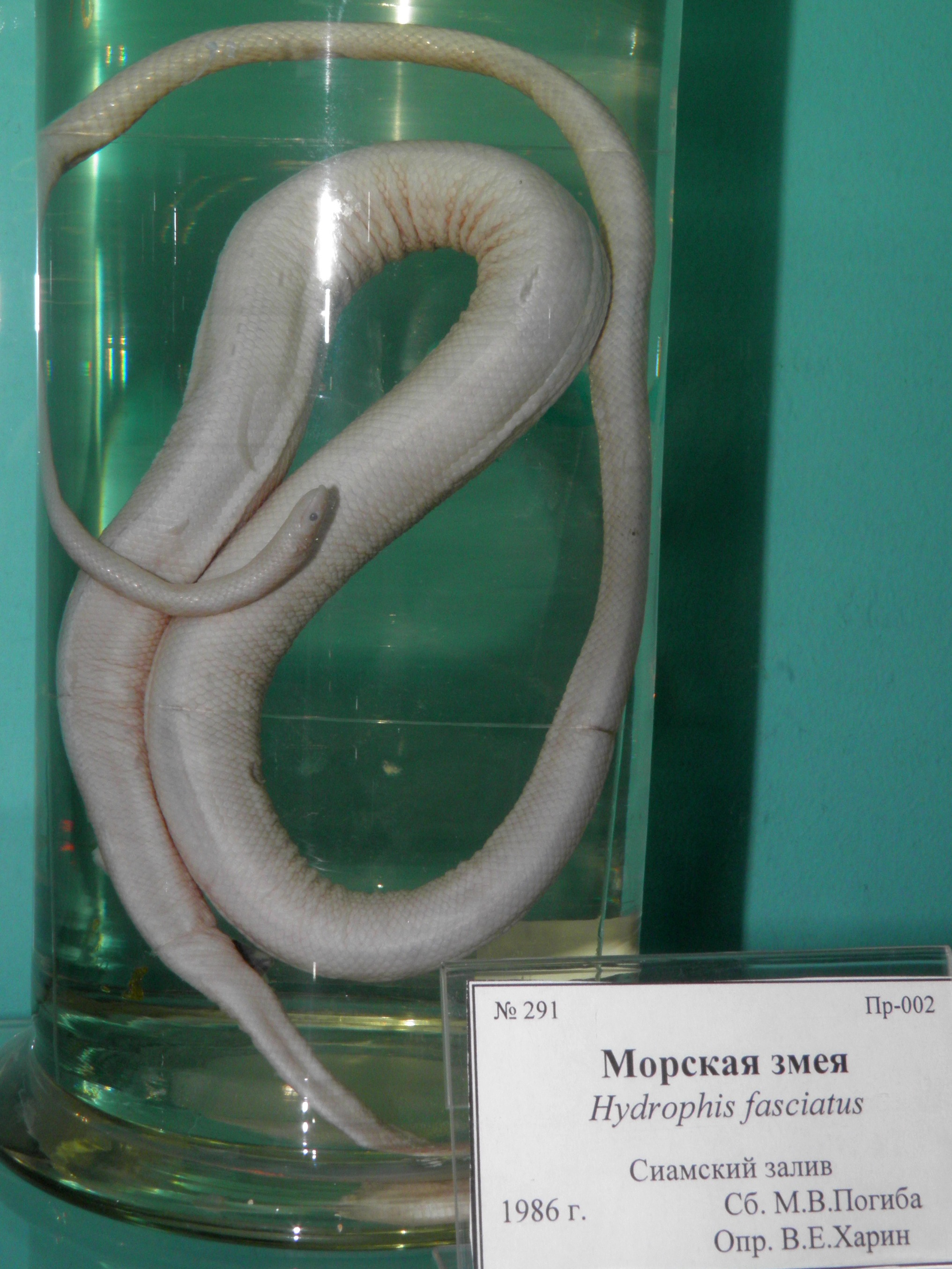

Conservation status
- Least Concern (IUCN 3.1)

Scientific classification
- Kingdom: Animalia
- Phylum: Chordata
- Class: Reptilia
- Order: Squamata
- Suborder: Serpentes
- Family: Elapidae
- Genus: Hydrophis
- Species: H. fasciatus

Binomial name
- Hydrophis fasciatus (Schneider, 1799)

Synonyms
- Hydrus fasciatus Schneider, 1799; Pelamis fasciatus; Merrem, 1820; Disteira fasciata; Fitzinger, 1826; Hydrophis fasciatus; A.M.C. Duméril & Bibron, 1854; Micromastophis fasciatus; Prater, 1924; Aturia fasciata; Wall, 1921; Hydrophis fasciatus; M.A. Smith, 1943

= Hydrophis fasciatus =

Species of snake

Hydrophis fasciatus, commonly known as the striped sea snake, is a species of venomous sea snake in the family Elapidae (Hydrophiinae).

== Description ==
Hydrophis fasciatus has a small head, long body and is slender anteriorly. The scales on thickest part of body are subquadrangular or hexagonal in shape, juxtaposed or slightly imbricate. It has 5-6 maxillary (upper jaw bone) teeth behind fangs and 2 anterior temporals.

Body scales in 28-33 rows around the neck, 47-58 around midbody (increase in number of rows from neck to midbody 20–27); ventral scales 414-514 (average 460).

Anterior part of body including head and neck dark olive to black with pale oval yellowish spots on sides, sometimes connected as crossbars; posterior, grayish; below whitish; dark rhomboidal spots may extend down the sides of the body and form complete annuli in young.

Total length males 1100 mm, females 990 mm; tail length males 100 mm, females 75 mm.

== Distribution ==
- Indian Ocean (coasts of Bangladesh, Pakistan, India, Myanmar, Thailand, Malaysia).
- Coasts of Indonesia (Sumatra, Java, Borneo).
- Coasts of Australia, Philippines, New Guinea.
- Coasts of Guangxi, Guangdong, Hainan, Fujian (China).
