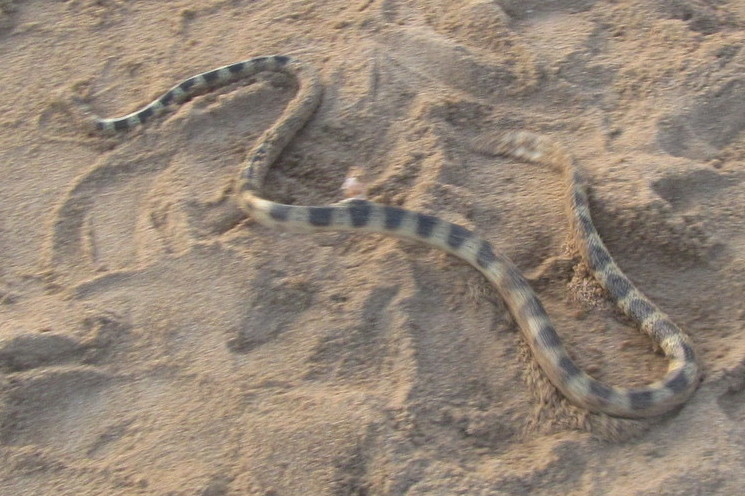

Conservation status
- Least Concern (IUCN 3.1)

Scientific classification
- Kingdom: Animalia
- Phylum: Chordata
- Class: Reptilia
- Order: Squamata
- Suborder: Serpentes
- Family: Elapidae
- Genus: Hydrophis
- Species: H. elegans

Binomial name
- Hydrophis elegans (JE Gray, 1842)

= Hydrophis elegans =

Species of snake

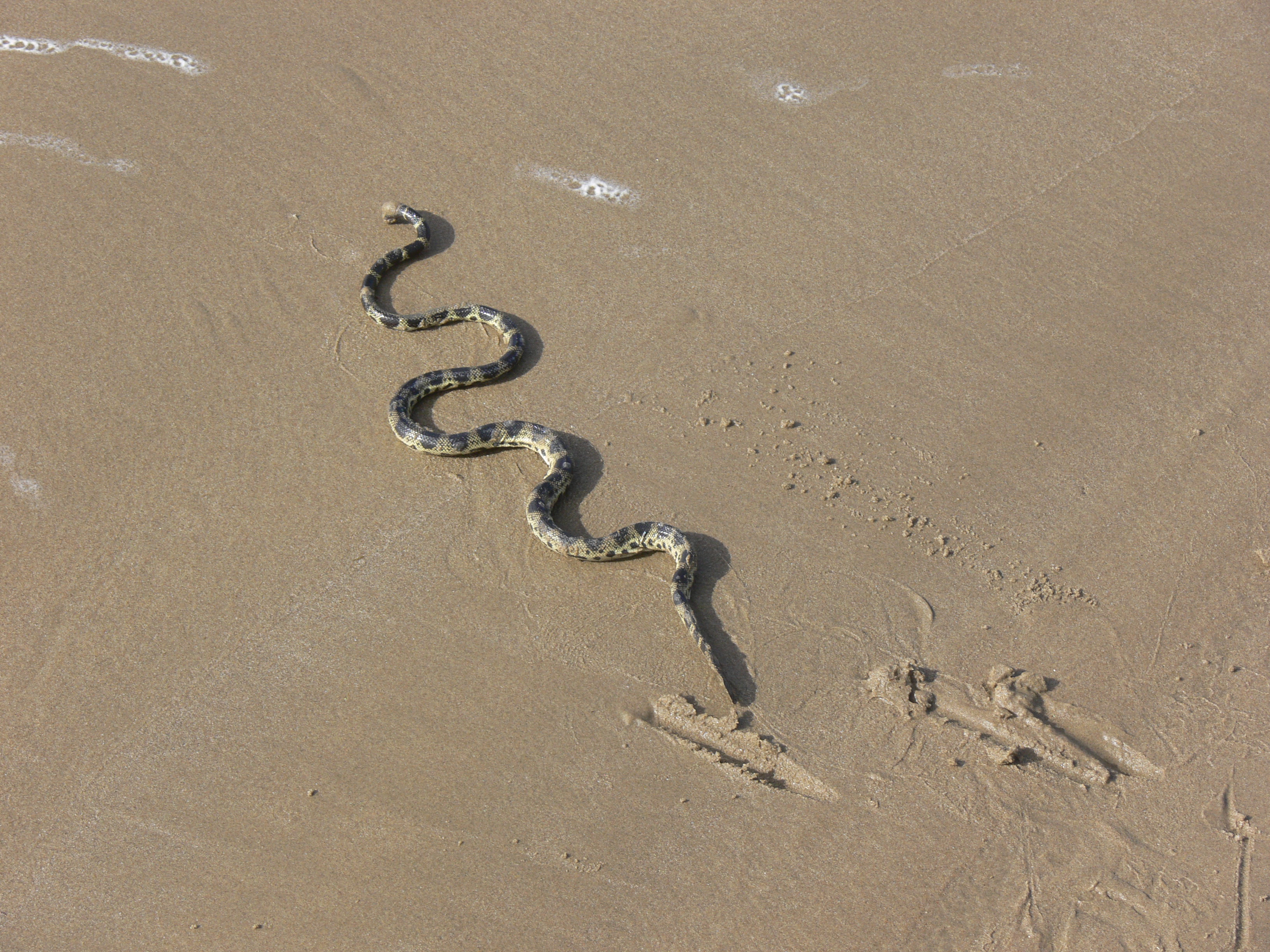
Elegant sea snake, (Hydrophis elegans), beach Yeppoon, Queensland

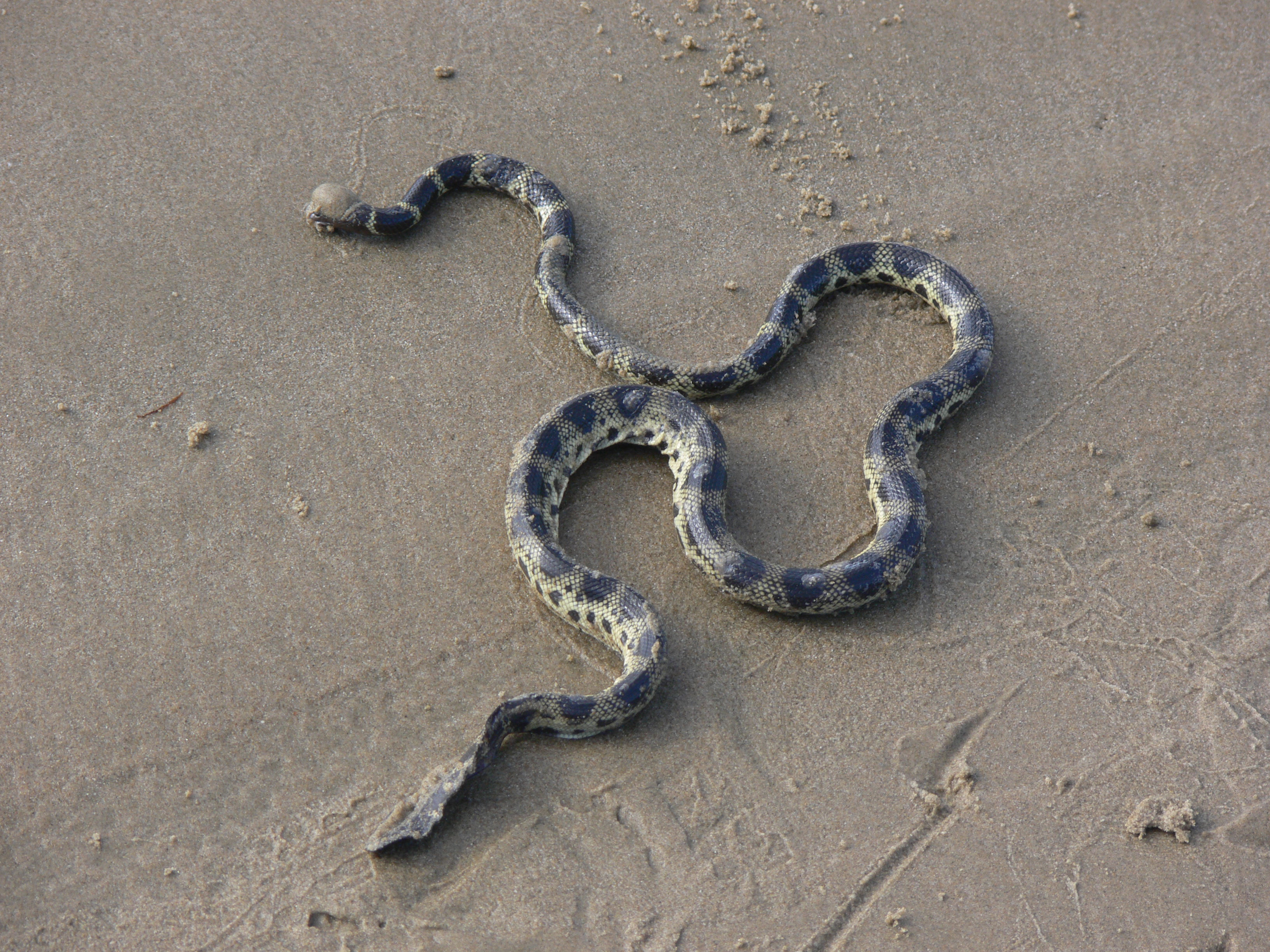
Elegant sea snake, showing lateral compression of tail and distinctive banding.

The elegant sea snake (Hydrophis elegans) is a highly venomous sea snake in the family Elapidae. They are found off the coast of Western Australia, Northern Territory and Queensland.

The elegant sea snake is a medium, and slender animal growing to a length of 2 meters (6.6 feet), although in 2008 one was found at a length of 2.6 meters (8.5 feet). Like many other sea snakes, the elegant sea snake has a laterally compressed tail that aids in swimming. These sea snakes can have up to 44 dorsal bands that are grayish black to black that span across the whole length of the body. They have large head scales, and like many other sea snakes, they have nostril valves to prevent water from getting into their lungs while diving. The body scales are imbricate, and in 37–49 rows at the mid-body. The ventral scales are usually undivided and about as wide as, or slightly wider than, neighboring scales of which there are approximately 345–432.
