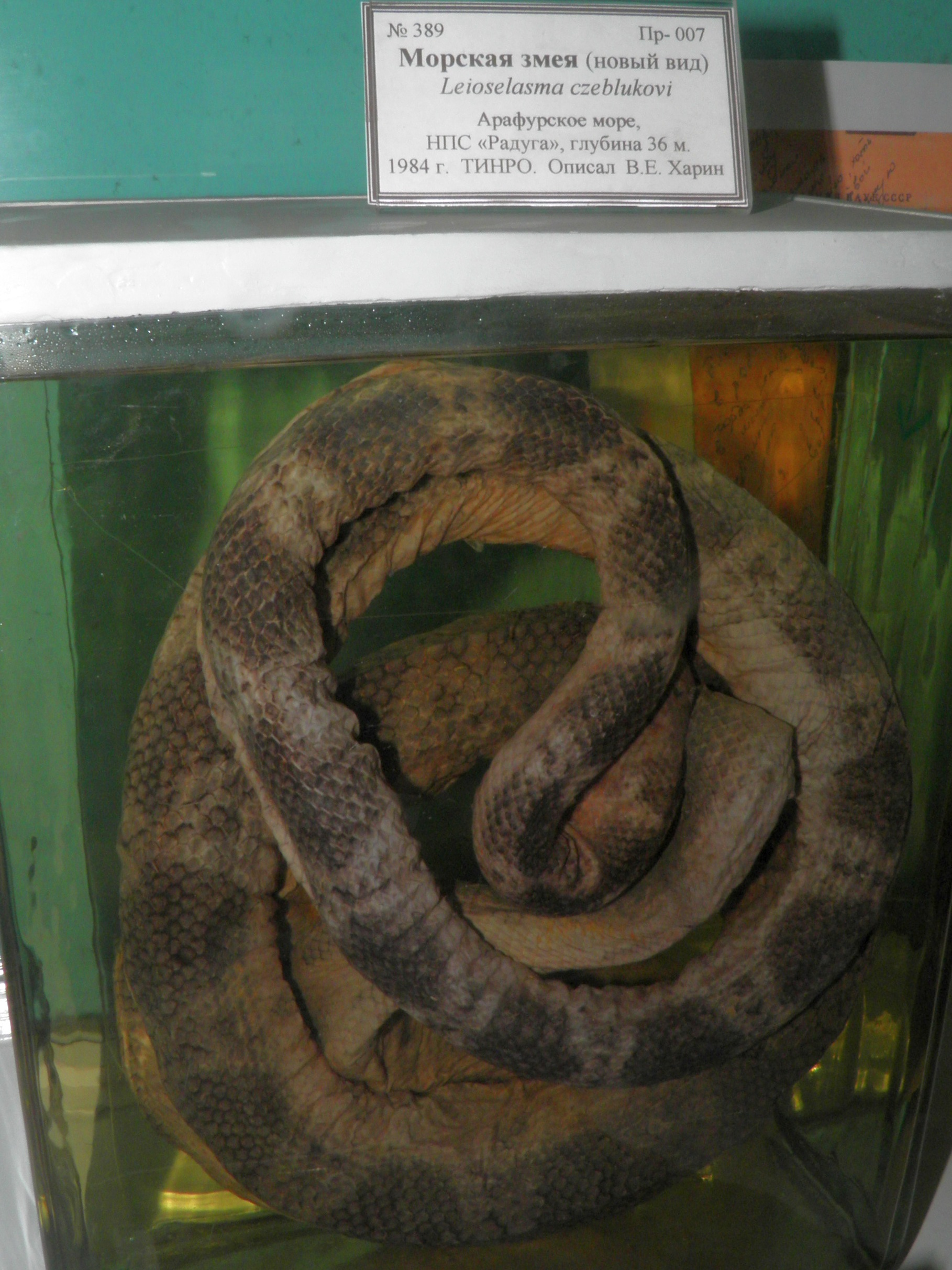
- Hydrophis czeblukovi

Conservation status
- Data Deficient (IUCN 3.1)

Scientific classification
- Kingdom: Animalia
- Phylum: Chordata
- Class: Reptilia
- Order: Squamata
- Suborder: Serpentes
- Family: Elapidae
- Genus: Hydrophis
- Species: H. czeblukovi

Binomial name
- Hydrophis czeblukovi (Kharin, 1984)

Synonyms
- Leioselasma czeblukovi Kharin, 1984; Hydrophis geometricus L.A. Smith, 1986; Aturia geometrica — Welch, 1994; Hydrophis czeblukovi — Cogger, 2000

= Geometrical sea snake =

Species of snake

Hydrophis czeblukovi, also known commonly as the fine-spined sea snake, the geometrical sea snake, and the geometrical seasnake, is species of venomous snake in the subfamily Hydrophiinae of the family Elapidae. The species is native to waters off northern Australia.

== Etymology ==
The specific name, czeblukovi, is in honor of Russian herpetologist Vladimir P. Czeblukov.

== Habitat ==
The preferred natural habitat of H. czeblukovi is the marine neritic zone, to a depth of 110 m (360 ft).

== Diet ==
H. czeblukovi preys upon marine fishes.

== Reproduction ==
H. czeblukovi is viviparous.
