= Spotted sea snake =

Hydrophis ocellatus

Conservation status
- Least Concern (IUCN 3.1)

Scientific classification
- Kingdom: Animalia
- Phylum: Chordata
- Class: Reptilia
- Order: Squamata
- Suborder: Serpentes
- Family: Elapidae
- Genus: Hydrophis
- Species: H. ocellatus

Binomial name
- Hydrophis ocellatus (Gray, 1849)

Species of snake

The spotted sea snake (Hydrophis ocellatus) is a species of marine snake native to the waters off northern Australia.
