= Hydrophis stricticollis =

Conservation status
- Data Deficient (IUCN 3.1)

Scientific classification
- Kingdom: Animalia
- Phylum: Chordata
- Class: Reptilia
- Order: Squamata
- Suborder: Serpentes
- Family: Elapidae
- Genus: Hydrophis
- Species: H. stricticollis

Binomial name
- Hydrophis stricticollis Günther, 1864

Synonyms
- Aturia stricticollis - Welch, 1994; Chitulia stricticollis - Kharin, 2005

Species of venomous sea snake

Hydrophis stricticollis, collared sea snake, is a species of venomous sea snake in the subfamily Hydrophiinae of the family Elapidae.

== Taxonomy ==
Hydrophis stricticollis was first described by Albert Günther in 1864. It currently belongs to the genus Hydrophis, though it was previously categorized in the genus Chitulia under the scientific name Chitulia stricticollis.

== Description ==
The species is characterized by a slender neck and forebody, posteriorly 2.5 to 3 times thicker than anteriorly. The size of males can reach around 105 centimeters (3.44 ft), females 105 centimeters (3.44 ft); with tail length ranging from 140 millimeters (5.5 in) in males to 90 millimeters (3.5 in) in females. Historical autopsy reports describe coloration as dark grey or olive, with a pale anterior belly and yellow mottling on the snout and sides. It has a small head, colored black or olive, with yellow markings on the snout and along the sides of the head. It has 45–65 dark bands slightly thinner than the yellowish area between each band, widest dorsally, disappearing with age. Tail with 11 vertical blackish bars, confluent on the under surface.

1 anterior temporal, rarely divided; 7-8 upper labials, the second being in contact with prefrontal scales. 3–4 border eyes; 34-41 scale rows around the neck, having either one or more tubercles in a straight line, tending to form an obscure keel. The central tubercle is the largest, the others being indistinct. 45-55 scale rows around midbody, with the scales on the thickest part of the body being subquadrangular or hexagonal in shape. 374-452 ventral scales, distinct throughout. Only on the anterior two-thirds of the trunk are the ventrals twice as broad as the adjoining scales; the rest are less than twice as large as adjacent body scales. 8-11 maxillary teeth found behind the fangs. There are 6 small anal scales, the middle one of the three on each side being the largest. The heart is located in almost the center of the body. All spines of the hemipenis are short, with proximal spines being wider than the others and no longer than half the length of the tail scales. The scales are smooth in young specimens.

== Distribution and habitat ==
Hydrophis stricticolis is endemic to the Indian Ocean, with its extent ranging from Sri Lanka, India, and Myanmar to Bangladesh.

=== Diet ===
Autopsy data suggests a diet consisting of cutlassfish, though specific species could not be identified due to being partially digested and the heads of the prey being absent. Because cutlassfish inhabit coastal waters ranging from 100 to 350 meters, it is theorized that this is also where the Hydrophis stricticollis reside.

=== Reproduction ===
There isn't much information regarding the reproductive biology of the Hydrophis species throughout the Indian Ocean, though it is known that reproductive cycles vary between different local regions.

It's suggested that sexual dimorphism may be present, but based on current data, whether or not sexual dimorphism is present can't be substantially supported.

== Venom ==
Its venom likely contains postsynaptic neurotoxins in the form of myotoxins, but it is not confirmed. Nephrotoxins and cardiotoxins are present but only inflict secondary nephrotoxicity and secondary cardiotoxicity.

=== Treatment ===
Standard first aid treatment for any bite from a snake suspected to be venomous is the application of a pressure bandage followed by the victim's transportation to a hospital or clinic, where they should be monitored for at least 24 hours. It is not recommended to use a tourniquet, suck at the wound, cauterize, or make an incision in the wound as an attempt at first aid.

== Conservation status ==
Hydrophis stricticollis is listed as Data Deficient in the IUCN Red List, with the population trends and number of mature individuals being unknown.
