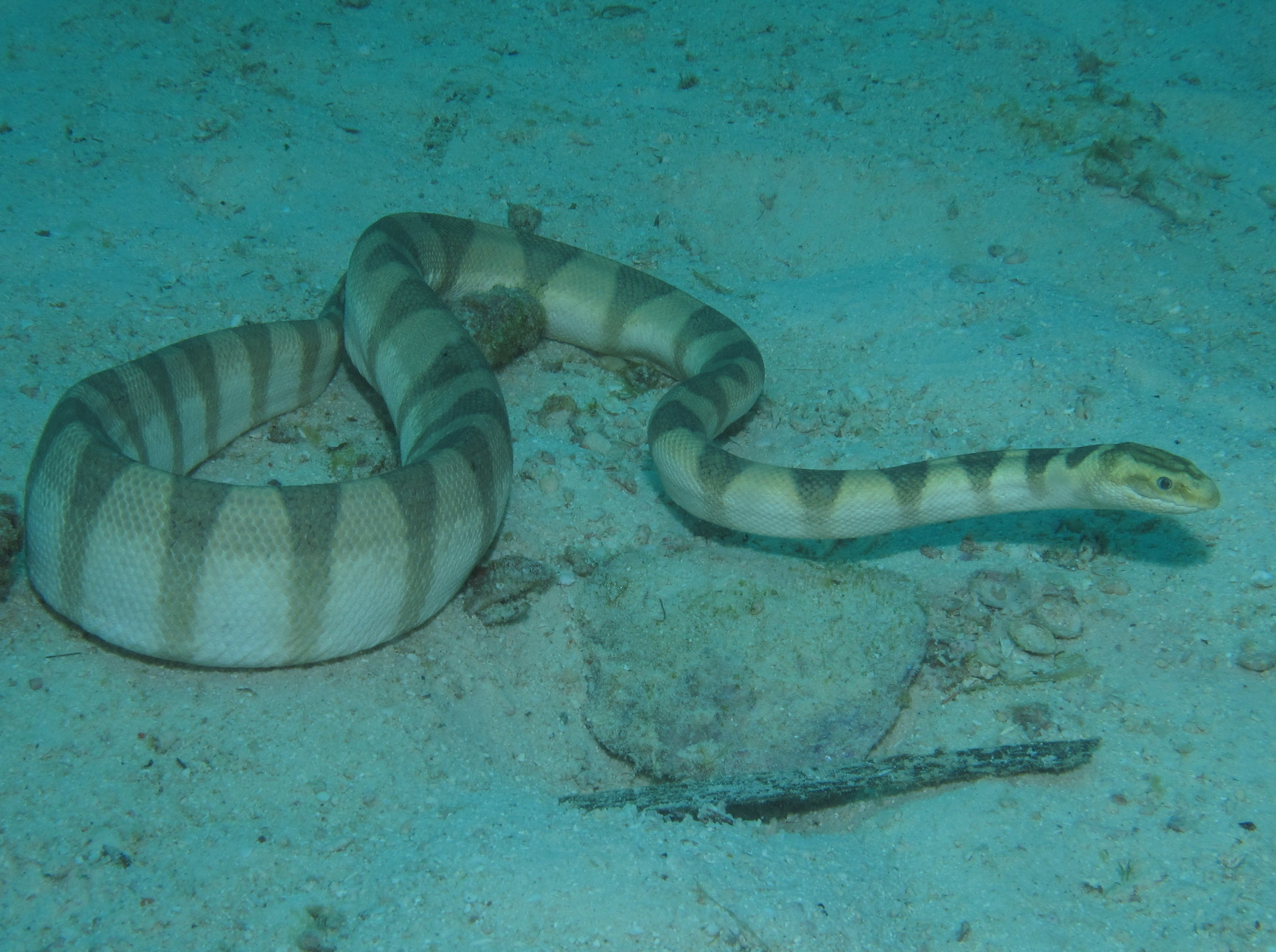
- Hydrophis lamberti in Daanbantayan, Philippines

Conservation status
- Least Concern (IUCN 3.1)

Scientific classification
- Kingdom: Animalia
- Phylum: Chordata
- Class: Reptilia
- Order: Squamata
- Suborder: Serpentes
- Family: Elapidae
- Genus: Hydrophis
- Species: H. lamberti

Binomial name
- Hydrophis lamberti M.A. Smith, 1917

Synonyms
- Chitulia lamberti (M.A. Smith, 1917); Chitulia (Chitulia) lamberti (M.A. Smith, 1917)

= Lambert's sea snake =

Species of snake

Lambert's sea snake (Hydrophis lamberti) is a species of marine venomous snake in the subfamily Hydrophiinae of the family Elapidae. The species is native to Southeast Asia.

== Etymology ==
The specific name, lamberti, is in honor of someone named "Lambert". However, Malcolm A. Smith, in his original description of this species, did not divulge the identity of that person, and he or she remains unknown.

== Geographic range ==
H. lamberti is native to marine waters around Cambodia, Malaysia, the Philippines, Singapore, Taiwan, Thailand, and Vietnam.

== Habitat ==
The preferred natural habitat of H. lamberti is coastal waters with sandy bottoms.

== Reproduction ==
H. lamberti is ovoviviparous.
