= Black-banded sea snake =

Conservation status
- Data Deficient (IUCN 3.1)

Scientific classification
- Kingdom: Animalia
- Phylum: Chordata
- Class: Reptilia
- Order: Squamata
- Suborder: Serpentes
- Family: Elapidae
- Genus: Hydrophis
- Species: H. melanosoma

Binomial name
- Hydrophis melanosoma Günther, 1864

Species of snake

The black-banded sea snake (Hydrophis melanosoma) is a marine snake native to waters around Malaysia, Borneo, Sumatra and Sulawesi. It eats eels.
