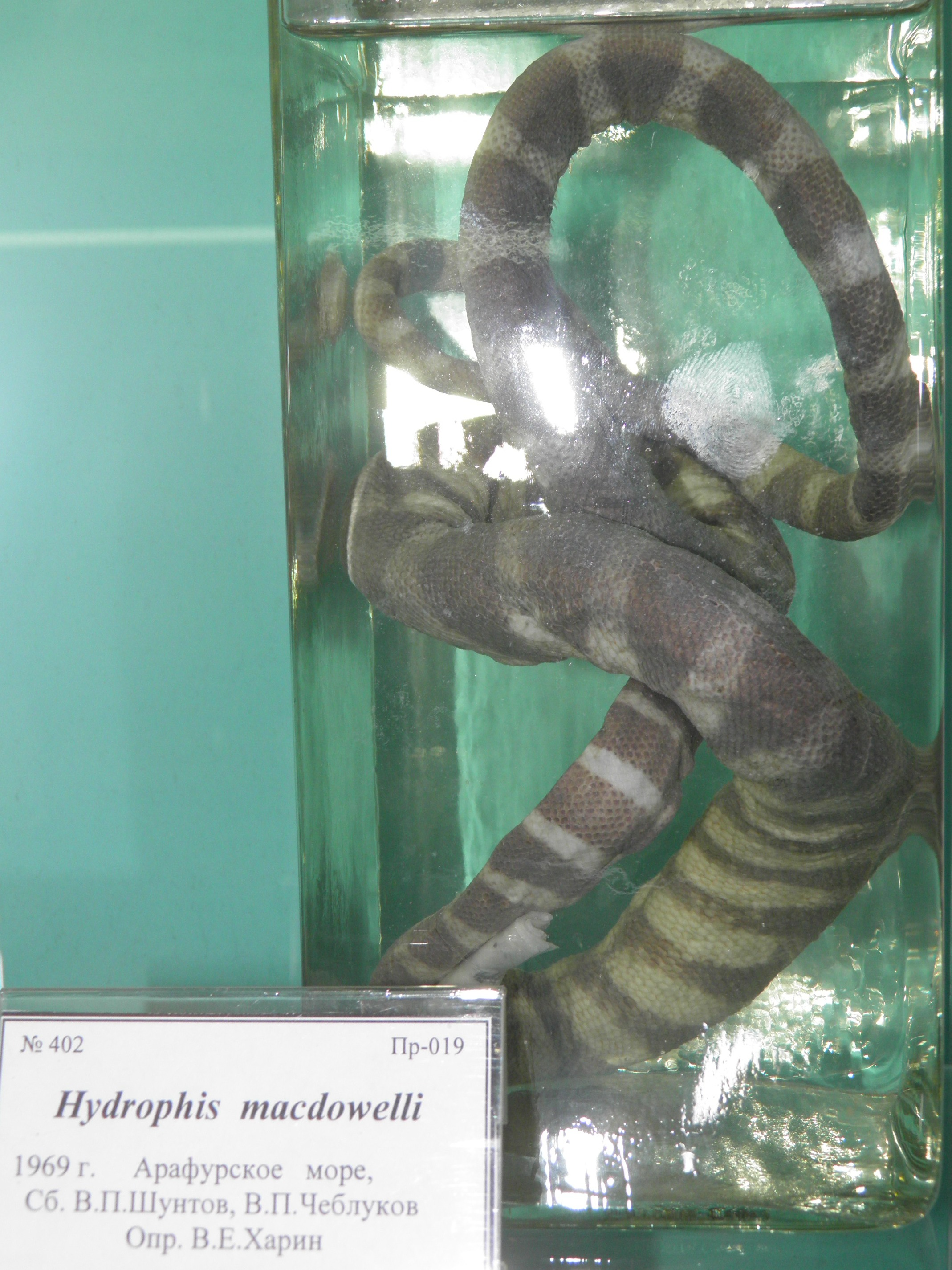

Conservation status
- Least Concern (IUCN 3.1)

Scientific classification
- Kingdom: Animalia
- Phylum: Chordata
- Class: Reptilia
- Order: Squamata
- Suborder: Serpentes
- Family: Elapidae
- Genus: Hydrophis
- Species: H. macdowelli

Binomial name
- Hydrophis macdowelli (Kharin, 1983)

= Small-headed sea snake =

Species of snake

The small-headed sea snake (Hydrophis macdowelli), also known commonly as McDowell's sea snake, is a species of venomous snake in the subfamily Hydrophiinae of the family Elapidae. The species is native to waters off northern Australia.

== Etymology ==
The specific name, macdowelli, is in honor of American herpetologist Samuel Booker McDowell Jr.

== Geographic distribution ==
Hydrophis macdowelli is found along the northern coast of Australia, the south central coast of Papua New Guinea, the Loyalty Islands, and New Caledonia.

== Habitat ==
The preferred natural habitat of Hydrophis macdowelli is shallow ocean waters with sandy bottoms, at depths of not more than 26 m (85 ft).

== Description ==
As one of its common names implies, Hydrophis macdowelli has a small head in relation to its body size. The species grows to a total length (tail included) of up to 1 metre (39 inches).

== Diet ==
Hydrophis macdowelli preys upon eels and other elongate fishes.

== Reproduction ==
Hydrophis macdowelli is ovoviviparous. Litter size is 2–3 young.

== Venom ==
Hydrophis macdowelli possesses a powerful venom, and its bite is dangerous to humans.
