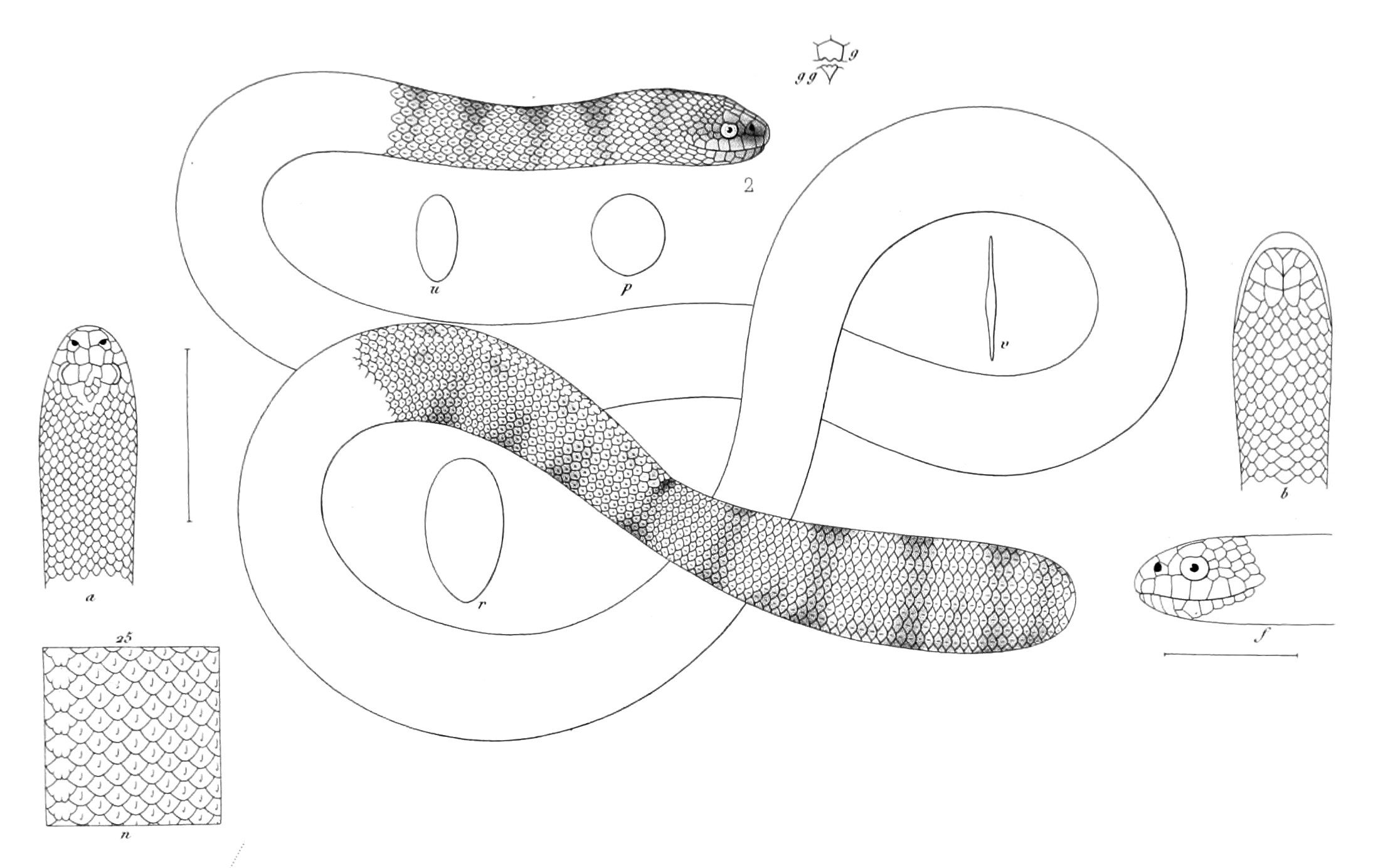
- By Ferdinando Sordelli in Jan & Sordelli, 1860

Conservation status
- Least Concern (IUCN 3.1)

Scientific classification
- Kingdom: Animalia
- Phylum: Chordata
- Class: Reptilia
- Order: Squamata
- Suborder: Serpentes
- Family: Elapidae
- Subfamily: Hydrophiinae
- Genus: Hydrophis
- Species: H. peronii

Binomial name
- Hydrophis peronii (A.M.C. Duméril, 1853)

Synonyms
- Acalyptus Peronii A.M.C. Duméril, 1853; Acalyptus superciliosus vel Peroni A.M.C. Duméril, Bibron, & A.H.A. Duméril, 1854; Acalyptus superciliosus — Fischer, 1856; Acalyptophis peronii — Boulenger, 1896; Pseudodisteira horrida Kinghorn, 1926; Hydrophis peronii — Sanders et al., 2012

= Hydrophis peronii =

Species of snake

Hydrophis peronii, commonly known as the horned sea snake, Peron's sea snake, and the spiny-headed seasnake, is a species of extremely venomous snake in the subfamily Hydrophiinae of the family Elapidae. The species is endemic to the western tropical Pacific Ocean. It is the only sea snake with "horns". It is sometimes placed in its own genus Acalyptophis.

== Etymology ==
The specific name, peronii, is in honor of François Péron, a French naturalist and explorer.

== Description ==
The spiny-headed seasnake is a medium-sized snake, with the diameter of the neck only one third to two fifths the diameter of the thickest part of the body. The head is small and the tail flattened laterally. The supraoculars are raised, and their free borders are pointed horn-like processes. This species reaches a snout-to-vent length (SVL) of up to 1.23 m (4.0 ft). Dorsally, it is grayish, pale olive, or tan, with dark crossbands, which are narrower than the spaces between them and taper to a point on the sides of the belly. Ventrally, it is uniform whitish or with a series of dark crossbars alternating with spots.

== Geographic range ==
Hydrophis peronii is found in the Gulf of Siam, Thailand, Vietnam, the South China Sea, the coast of Guangdong and Strait of Taiwan, the Philippines, Indonesia, New Guinea, New Caledonia, the Coral Sea Islands, Papua New Guinea, and Australia, (Northern Territory, Queensland, Western Australia, & possibly New South Wales).

== Habitat ==
The preferred habitats of Hydrophis peronii are seas with sandy beds and coral reefs, from shallow waters to a depth of 60 m (200 ft).

== Diet ==
Hydrophis peronii preys predominately upon gobies, but also upon other small fishes.

== Reproduction ==
Hydrophis peronii is a viviparous species that produces up to 10 live young per female.

== Venom ==
As determined by laboratory tests on mice, the venom of Hydrophis peronii is among the most toxic sea snake venoms known. However, as of 2023 no human fatalities had been recorded.
