= Hydrophis mamillaris =

Conservation status
- Data Deficient (IUCN 3.1)

Scientific classification
- Kingdom: Animalia
- Phylum: Chordata
- Class: Reptilia
- Order: Squamata
- Suborder: Serpentes
- Family: Elapidae
- Genus: Hydrophis
- Species: H. mamillaris

Binomial name
- Hydrophis mamillaris (Daudin, 1803)

Species of snake

Hydrophis mamillaris, sometimes referred to as the Bombay sea snake or broad-banded sea snake is a species of venomous sea snake native to the Indian Ocean. It is a poorly studied and surveyed species, with few records and a dubious type specimen.

== Taxonomy and etymology ==
The Bombay sea snake was first described by François Marie Daudin in 1803, from a specimen collected at Visakhapatnam on India's eastern coast. It was first assigned to the genus Anguis, and given the specific name mamillaris. This refers to the central tubercle at the center of each scale, which was thought to resemble the mammalian nipple.

Some authorities express doubt over the veracity of Daudin's type specimen, arguing that the vague description provided is insufficient. However, later specimens collected at Visakhapatnam were apparently satisfactory, and most available research asserts that the Bombay sea snake is a valid species.

In the two centuries since the Bombay sea snake's discovery, assignments to multiple genera have been proposed- including Aturia, Chitulia, and Leioselasma. It was assigned to Hydrophis in 1943, where it remains to this day.

== Description ==
The Bombay sea snake is a small (2–2 ½ feet) snake with greyish coloration and a body patterned with black bands. These bands are broader than the interval scales at the mid-body, a trait that is unique to this snake in the Indian Ocean.

The head is black in color, with small eyes and a rounded snout of moderate length. The tail is laterally compressed, black in color, and encircled by one to six light-colored rings which are broken on the underside of the tail. The center of each scale features a protruding tubercle.

== Habitat and behavior ==
A pelagic species most commonly encountered along the coast, the Bombay sea snake likely travels via currents over long distances. Typically found in areas with soft substrate, such as sand or mud.

Little is known of the mating habits of this snake—based on the single recorded gravid female, they are viviparous. The brood size was 3–4, and the young measured 12 inches long near birth. Gravid females apparently reach a larger size (2 feet, 8 inches).

== Distribution ==
They have been collected all along the Indian coast, although specimens are concentrated near Mumbai on the western coast and Visakhapatnam on the eastern coast. Specimens have also been encountered off the coast of Pakistan, and a single record exists for Sri Lanka.

== Conservation status ==
The Bombay sea snake's population is considered Data Deficient by the IUCN, indicating a dearth of specimens and a poorly understood distribution. There have been no confirmed collections since 1926, but modern surveys have documented the snake in the Gujarat Marine Protected Area off the western coast of India.

The snake is considered rare by what authorities exist, and it is potentially threatened by marine bycatch.
