= Hydrophis semperi =

Conservation status
- Vulnerable (IUCN 3.1)

Scientific classification
- Kingdom: Animalia
- Phylum: Chordata
- Class: Reptilia
- Order: Squamata
- Suborder: Serpentes
- Family: Elapidae
- Genus: Hydrophis
- Species: H. semperi

Binomial name
- Hydrophis semperi Garman, 1881

Synonyms
- Distira semperi — Boulenger, 1896; Leioselasma semperi — Kharin, 1984; Hydrophis semperi — Sanders et al., 2012

Species of snake

Hydrophis semperi, commonly known as the Lake Taal snake, Garman's sea snake, the Philippine freshwater sea snake, and the Luzon sea snake, is a rare species of venomous sea snake endemic to Taal Lake on the island of Luzon in the Philippines. It is noted for being one of only two known species of sea snakes that are known to be found almost-exclusively in freshwater and being a very young species, having only evolved after being separated from the ocean in the 16th Century. The only other freshwater sea snake species is Hydrophis sibauensis, while a third species, Laticauda crockeri, occurs in a brackish lake.

== Etymology ==
H. semperi was named after Carl Semper, a German ecologist who discovered the species in the mid-19th century. Locally, the snake is known as duhol matapang.

== Taxonomy ==
H. semperi is classified with the rest of the "true" sea snakes in the subfamily Hydrophiinae of the family Elapidae.

== Description ==
Like all "true" sea snakes, H. semperi is a rather heavyset snake, elongated with a small head. It possesses the characteristic flattened, paddle-like tail found in the members of its subfamily. This particular species is considered short in comparison to the rest of the family; adult specimens of H. semperi that have been caught have a total length (including tail) of 50 to 70 cm (20 to 28 in). The snake is colored much like a typical sea snake, having a dark blue or black body with narrow yellow (sometimes white) crossbands. Like its close relatives, its nostrils are located almost dorsally, with valves that prevent water from entering its nasal (and oral) cavities when the snake is submerged.

== Habitat and evolution ==
H. semperi is known to be found only in the waters of Lake Taal (formerly known as Lake Bombon) in the province of Batangas in the Philippines. The only freshwater sea snake in the country, it lives the entirety of its life within the confines of the lake, feeding and breeding in its slightly acidic waters. The lake itself is a volcanic crater lake, which was formerly saltwater but gradually lost its salinity after the lake was closed off from the sea by an eruption in the 16th century. It is this unique aspect of the lake's formation and history that led to the evolution of several once-saltwater species, including H. semperi. Thus, this species is relatively young, having been accustomed to freshwater for less than a millennium.

== Diet ==
As with "true" sea snakes, H. semperi is piscivorous, feeding primarily on the numerous fish species that are known to dwell in Taal Lake's murky waters.

== Biology ==
Very little is known about the life history of H. semperi, including its ecology and breeding cycles.

== Conservation status ==
Since so little is known about the reproductive habits of the species H. semperi, there have been virtually no estimates of the snake's population. Like many other species endemic to the lake, it is vulnerable as a species to any anthropogenic effects on the lake's ecosystem, both direct and indirect. Pollution is always a major issue when it comes to enclosed bodies of water with numerous surrounding human settlements. The numerous commercial establishments, towns and plantations dumping chemicals and sewage into the lake, combined with the dense population of fish farms in the lake's waters may yet have an adverse effect on the health of the species as a whole. In addition, while the snake itself has no commercial value and is not harvested, it suffers from the typical human stigma that is often attributed to snakes. Fishermen that frequently encounter the docile snakes have been known to kill them simply because of what they are.
