= Smith's small-headed sea snake =

Conservation status
- Data Deficient (IUCN 3.1)

Scientific classification
- Kingdom: Animalia
- Phylum: Chordata
- Class: Reptilia
- Order: Squamata
- Suborder: Serpentes
- Family: Elapidae
- Genus: Hydrophis
- Species: H. parviceps

Binomial name
- Hydrophis parviceps M.A. Smith, 1935

Species of snake

Smith's small-headed sea snake (Hydrophis parviceps) is a marine snake native to waters around the mouth of the Mekong River in Vietnam.
