= Hydrophis bituberculatus =

Conservation status
- Data Deficient (IUCN 3.1)

Scientific classification
- Kingdom: Animalia
- Phylum: Chordata
- Class: Reptilia
- Order: Squamata
- Suborder: Serpentes
- Family: Elapidae
- Genus: Hydrophis
- Species: H. bituberculatus

Binomial name
- Hydrophis bituberculatus Peters, 1872

Synonyms
- Hydrophis bituberculatus Peters, 1872; Distira bituberculata; Boulenger, 1890; Lioselasma bituberculata; Wall, 1921; Hydrophis bituberculatus; M.A. Smith, 1943; Aturia bituberculata; Welch, 1994; Hydrophis bituberculatus; Rasmussen, 1992; Chitulia bituberculata; Kharin, 2005

Species of snake

Hydrophis bituberculatus, commonly known as Peters's sea snake, is a species of venomous elapid. It is found in the Indian Ocean (Sri Lanka, Thailand).
