= Hydrophis zweifeli =

Conservation status
- Data Deficient (IUCN 3.1)

Scientific classification
- Kingdom: Animalia
- Phylum: Chordata
- Class: Reptilia
- Order: Squamata
- Suborder: Serpentes
- Family: Elapidae
- Genus: Hydrophis
- Species: H. zweifeli

Binomial name
- Hydrophis zweifeli Kharin, 1985

Species of snake

Hydrophis zweifeli is a species of snakes found from New Guinea to Australia (Northern Territory and Queensland). In the past they were thought to be Hydrophis schistosus, but after DNA testing are now provisionally identified as Hydrophis zweifeli. DNA test have shown they are not related to Hydrophis schistosus.

Hydrophis zweifeli are commonly known as the Sepik beaked sea snake or Zweifel's beaked sea snake. Hydrophis zweifeli is a highly venomous species of sea snake.

Studied Hydrophis zweifeli have been near the mouth of Sepik River of New Guinea.
