= Hydrophis viperinus =

Viperine sea snake

Conservation status
- Least Concern (IUCN 3.1)

Scientific classification
- Kingdom: Animalia
- Phylum: Chordata
- Class: Reptilia
- Order: Squamata
- Suborder: Serpentes
- Family: Elapidae
- Genus: Hydrophis
- Species: H. viperinus

Binomial name
- Hydrophis viperinus (Schmidt, 1852)

Synonyms
- Praescutata viperina (Schmidt, 1852) Thalassophina viperina (Schmidt, 1852)

Species of snake

Hydrophis viperinus, commonly known as the viperine sea snake, is a species of venomous sea snake in the family Elapidae (Hydrophiinae).

== Diagnostic characters ==
Scales hexagonal, juxtaposed, in 27–34 rows on the neck, 37–50 at midbody; ventrals 226–274, anteriorly about half the width of the body, narrowing posterior to about twice the width of the adjacent scales, or slightly less; head shields entire, nostrils superior, nasal shields in contact with one another; prefrontals longer than broad, not in contact with upper labials; 1, rarely 2, pre- and 1–2 postoculars; 7-9 upper labials, 3–5 bordering eye (sometimes only 3–4 or 4–5); usually 1 anterior temporal, occasionally 2 or 3; body color, more or less bicolored, gray above, white below, the two usually clearly demarcated on the sides, often with 25–35 dark rhomboidal spots, rarely with dark bands. Total length: males 925 mm, females 820 mm; tail length: males 100 mm, females 80 mm

== Distribution ==
Northern coasts of the Indian Ocean and western Pacific: from the Persian Gulf to around India to Indonesia and southern China. IUCN lists the following countries: Bahrain, Bangladesh, Cambodia, China, India (Andaman Is., Nicobar Is.), Indonesia, Iran Iraq, Japan, Kuwait, Malaysia, Myanmar, Oman, Pakistan, Philippines, Qatar, Saudi Arabia, Singapore, Sri Lanka, Taiwan, Thailand, United Arab Emirates, and Vietnam.
