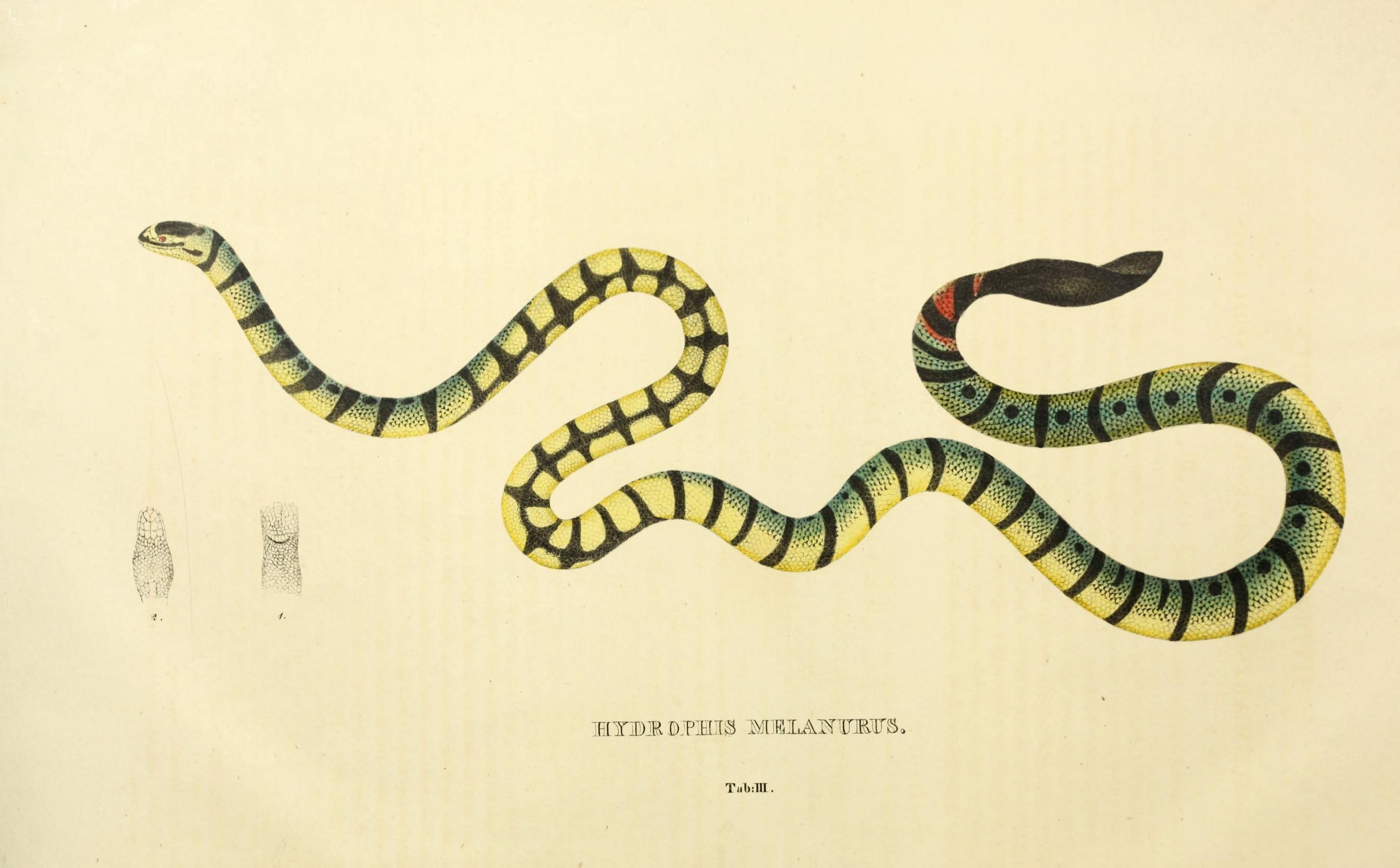

Conservation status
- Least Concern (IUCN 3.1)

Scientific classification
- Kingdom: Animalia
- Phylum: Chordata
- Class: Reptilia
- Order: Squamata
- Suborder: Serpentes
- Family: Elapidae
- Genus: Hydrophis
- Species: H. spiralis

Binomial name
- Hydrophis spiralis (Shaw, 1802)

Synonyms
- Hydrus spiralis Shaw, 1802; Enhydris spiralis; Merrem, 1820; Hydrophis spiralis; Gray, 1849; Lioselasma spiralis; Wall, 1921; Leioselasma spiralis; Kharin, 1984

= Hydrophis spiralis =

Species of snake

Hydrophis spiralis, commonly known as the yellow sea snake, is a species of venomous sea snake in the family Elapidae.

== Description ==
This is perhaps the longest species of sea-snake, measuring up to 3.0 metres (9.8 ft); however, most specimens do not exceed 2.0 meters. This marine serpent is cathemeral, i.e., active both by day and night.

=== Diagnostic characteristics ===
The scales on the thickest part of the body have rounded or pointed tips and overlap. Six or seven maxillary teeth are found behind the fangs. The species has 25–31 scale rows around its neck, 33–38 around its midbody, and ventrals number 295–362, and are distinct throughout and about twice as broad as adjacent body scales. Its color is yellowish or yellowish-green above; the dorsal scales are edged with black, and 41–46 narrow black bands encircle the body; the bands are usually less than one-third the width of the lighter interspaces. The head, in the young, is black, with a yellow horseshoe-shaped marking; in the adult, the head is usually yellow. Total length in males is about 1.62 metres (5.3 ft), and females 1.83 metres (6.0 ft); tail lengths are 140 millimetres (5.5 in) and 120 millimetres (4.7 in) in males and females respectively.

Yellow Sea snake

== Geographic range ==
Hydrophis spiralis is found in the Indian Ocean (Persian Gulf, off the coasts of Oman, United Arab Emirates, Iran, Iraq, Saudi Arabia, Bahrain and Kuwait. It is also found in Pakistan, Sri Lanka, India (incl. Andaman & Nicobar Is.), Indonesia, Bangladesh, Malaysia, Philippines, China, New Guinea, New Caledonia/Loyalty Islands, Thailand, Vietnam, Brunei, Cambodia and Myanmar. The species has been reported to live in waters as deep as 50m.
