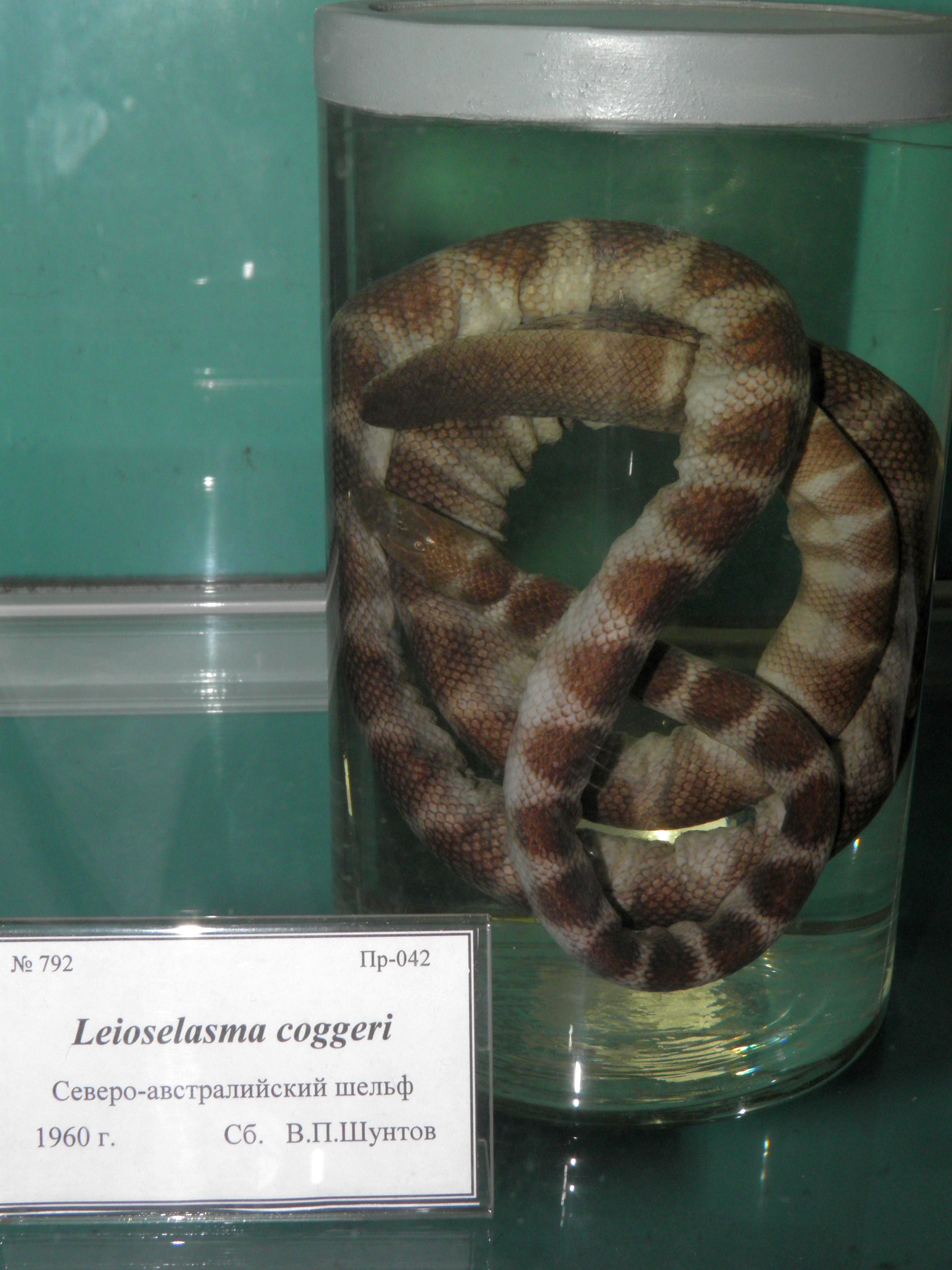

Conservation status
- Least Concern (IUCN 3.1)

Scientific classification
- Kingdom: Animalia
- Phylum: Chordata
- Class: Reptilia
- Order: Squamata
- Suborder: Serpentes
- Family: Elapidae
- Genus: Hydrophis
- Species: H. coggeri

Binomial name
- Hydrophis coggeri (Kharin, 1984)

Synonyms
- Leioselasma coggeri Kharin, 1984; Hydrophis coggeri — Bauer & Vindum, 1990

= Slender-necked sea snake =

slender-necked sea snake

Species of snake

The slender-necked sea snake (Hydrophis coggeri), also known commonly as Cogger's sea snake, is a species of marine venomous snake in the subfamily Hydrophiinae of the family Elapidae. The species is native to waters around western Australia and the southern Pacific Ocean.

== Etymology ==
The specific name, coggeri, is in honor of Australian herpetologist Harold Cogger.

== Geographic range ==
H. coggeri is found in marine waters around Fiji, the Loyalty Islands, New Caledonia, and western Australia. The type locality is in Fiji.

== Habitat ==
The preferred natural habitats of H. coggeri are coral reefs and seagrass beds, to a depth of 45 m (148 ft).

== Diet ==
H. coggeri preys upon eels.

== Reproduction ==
H. coggeri is viviparous. A gravid female was found to contain three embryos.
