= Hydrophis annandalei =

Conservation status
- Data Deficient (IUCN 3.1)

Scientific classification
- Kingdom: Animalia
- Phylum: Chordata
- Class: Reptilia
- Order: Squamata
- Suborder: Serpentes
- Family: Elapidae
- Genus: Hydrophis
- Species: H. annandalei

Binomial name
- Hydrophis annandalei (Laidlaw, 1901)

Synonyms
- Distira annandalei Laidlaw, 1901; Kolpophis annandalei — M.A. Smith, 1926; Lapemis annandalei — Rasmussen, 1997; Kolpophis annandalei — Murphy, Cox & Voris, 1999; Hydrophis annandalei — Leviton et al., 2014

Species of snake

Hydrophis annandalei, commonly known as Annandale's sea snake or the bighead sea snake, is a species of venomous snake in the subfamily Hydrophiinae of the family Elapidae. The species, which is sometimes placed in its own genus Kolpophis, is native to parts of the Indian Ocean.

== Etymology ==
The specific name, annandalei, is in honor of Scottish herpetologist Nelson Annandale.

== Geographic range ==
H. annandalei is found in the Indian Ocean, in waters off Indonesia (Borneo, Java), western Malaysia, Singapore, Cambodia, Thailand, and southern Vietnam.

== Habitat ==
The preferred natural habitats of H. annandalei are shallow muddy coastal waters.

== Description ==
H. annandalei may attain a snout-to-vent length (SVL) of 52 cm (20 in). Its coloration, which consists of dark crossbands on a bluish grey ground color dorsally, and which is uniform pale yellow or cream ventrally, is similar to that of other sea snakes. However, K. annandalei can be identified by its high number of dorsal scale rows, 74–93 at midbody.

== Reproduction ==
H. annandalei is viviparous.
