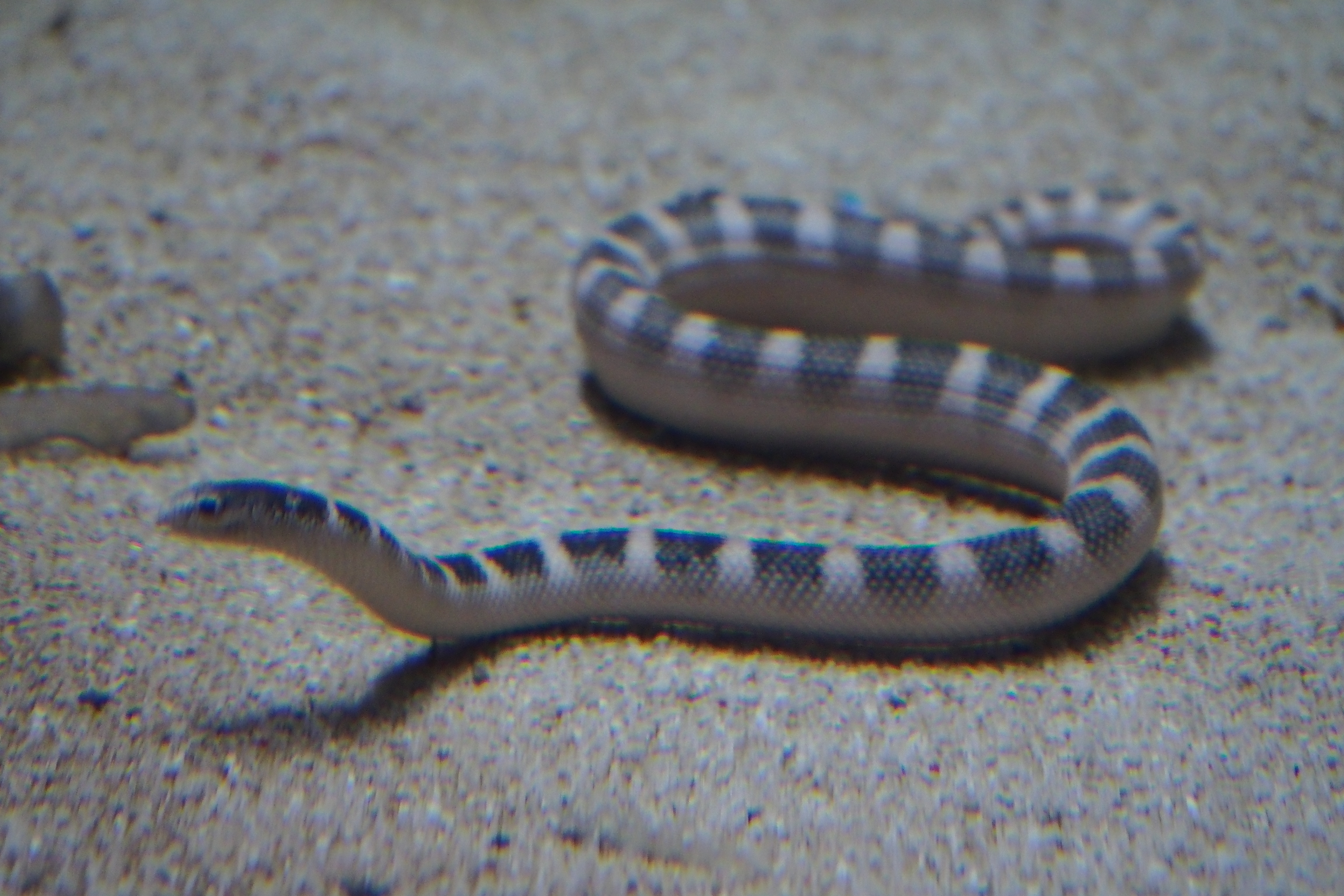

Conservation status
- Least Concern (IUCN 3.1)

Scientific classification
- Kingdom: Animalia
- Phylum: Chordata
- Class: Reptilia
- Order: Squamata
- Suborder: Serpentes
- Family: Elapidae
- Genus: Hydrophis
- Species: H. ornatus

Binomial name
- Hydrophis ornatus (Gray, 1842)

Synonyms
- Aturia ornata Gray, 1842; Hydrophis ornata; Günther, 1860; Distira ornata; Boulenger, 1890; Disteira ornata; Taylor, 1922; Hydrophis ornatus; M.A. Smith, 1943; Chitulia ornata - Kharin, 2005

= Hydrophis ornatus =

Species of snake

Hydrophis ornatus, commonly known as the ornate reef sea snake, is a species of venomous sea snake in the family Elapidae.

== Distribution ==
This snake-species is found to occur in Andaman & Nicobar Islands, Bahrain, Bangladesh, Cambodia, China (Coasts of Guangxi, Guangdong, Hainan, Hong Kong and Shandong), India (from Gujarat, through Kerala and Tamil Nadu to West Bengal), Indonesia (Bali, Borneo, Java, Sulawesi, Sumatra and other Island coasts), Iran, Iraq, Japan (incl. Ryukyu Is.), Kuwait, Malaysia, Myanmar, New Caledonia, Oman, Pakistan, Palau, Papua New Guinea, Philippines, Qatar, Saudi Arabia, Singapore, Sri Lanka, Taiwan, Thailand, United Arab Emirates (UAE) and Vietnam. It is also reported from Australia (Western Australia, Northern Territory, Queensland and New South Wales), Brunei, Fiji, Samoa, Solomon Islands, Tonga, Vanuatu Kiribati and Iraq.
