= Vladimir Kharin (zoologist) =

Vladimir Yemelyanovich Kharin
- Владимир Емельянович Харин
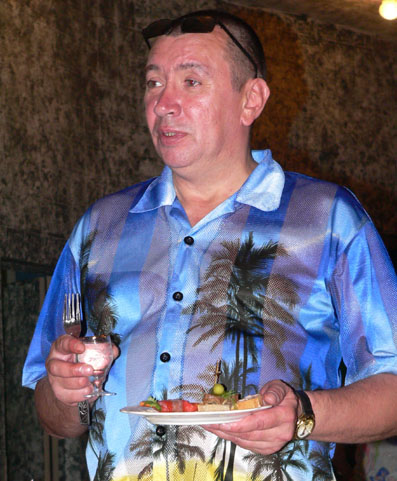
- Born: November 3, 1957; Vladivostok
- Died: May 20, 2013 (aged 55); Vladivostok
- Citizenship: Russia
- Education: State Far Eastern University (1981)
- Known for: zoologist, Ichthyologist, herpetologist
- Scientific career
- Workplaces: TINRO-Center, Institute of Marine Biology, Vladivostok
- Author abbrev. (zoology): Kharin

Vladimir Yemelyanovich Kharin (1957–2013) was a Russian zoologist, ichthyologist, herpetologist, and a specialist in sea snakes.

== Life and career ==
Kharin was born November 3, 1957, in Vladivostok. In 1981 he graduated State Far Eastern University. From 1980 to 1984 he worked at the TINRO-Center. In 1984, he was arrested for political reasons and subjected to compulsory psychiatric treatment. From 2003 until the end of his life, he was an employee of the Institute of Marine Biology, Far Eastern Branch of the Russian Academy of Sciences. He received his Candidate of Sciences degree in biology from the Academy in 2006. His thesis was titled "Таксономия морских змей (Hydrophiidae sensu lato) мирового океана". Kharin was author and co-author of more than 70 scientific works. He described seven species of fish which were new to science (including Caprodon krasyukovae Kharin, 1983 and Himantolophus borealis Kharin, 1984), and also seven new species of sea snakes.

== Publications ==
- Kharin V.E. Аннотированный каталог морских змей (Serpentes: Laticaudidae, Hydrophiidae) Мирового океана // Известия ТИНРО-Центра. 2005. Т. 140. С. 71–89. (in Russian)
- Kharin V.E. Biota of the Russian Waters of the Sea of Japan. Vol. 7. Reptilians. Vladivostok: Dal'nauka, 2008. 170 p. (in Russian and English)
- Kharin V.E., Czeblukov V.P. A new revision of sea kraits of family Laticaudidae Cope, 1879 (Serpentes, Colubroidea)//Russian Journal of Herpetology. 2006. Vol. 13. pp. 227–241.
- Kharin V.E., Czeblukov V.P. A revision of the sea snakes of subfamily Hydrophiinae. 1. Tribe Disteirini nov. (Serpentes: Hydrophiidae)//Russian Journal of Herpetology. 2009. Vol. 16. pp. 183–202.
- Kharin V.E., Orlov N.L., Ananjeva N.B. New records and redescription of rare and little‐known elapid snake Bungarus slowinskii (Serpentes: Elapidae: Bungarinae) // Russian Journal of Herpetology. 2011. Vol. 18. No 4. pp. 284–294.
- Kharin V.E., Orlov N.L., Czeblukov V.P. Sea kraits (Laticaudidae) and sea snakes (Hydrophiidae) of Vietnam. Taxonomy and bibliography. In A.V. Adrianov and K.A. Lutaenko (eds). Biodiversity of the western part of the South China Sea. 2016. Vladivostok: Dalnauka. pp. 27–110.
- Markevich A.I., Kharin V.E. A new species of prickleback Ernogrammus zhirmunskii (Acanthopterygii: Perciformes: Stichaeidae) from the Sea of Japan, Russia //Zootaxa. 2011. No. 2814. pp. 59–66.

== List of taxa first scientifically described by Kharin V.E. ==
- Subfamily Aipysurinae (Kharin, 1984)
- Triba Disteirini (Kharin, 2009)
- Genus Pseudolaticauda (Kharin, 1984)
- Genus Smithsohydrophis (Kharin, 1981)
- Disteira walli (Kharin, 1989)
- Enhydrina zweifeli (Kharin, 1985)
- Hydrophis coggeri (Kharin, 1984)
- Hydrophis czeblukovi (Kharin, 1984)
- Hydrophis macdowelli Kharin, 1983
- Hydrophis vorisi (Kharin, 1984)

== References and Bibliography ==
- Balanov, A.A.; Zemnukhov, V.V.; Yepur, I.V.; Parensky, V.A.; Pitruk, D.L. (2013). "Памяти Владимира Емельяновича Харина (1957–2013)". Современная герпетология (in Russian). 13 (3–4): 170–175. ISSN 1814-6090.
- Beolens, Bo; Watkins, Michael; Grayson, Michael (2011). The Eponym Dictionary of Reptiles. Baltimore: Johns Hopkins University Press. ISBN 9781421401355. LCCN 1421401355. xiii + 296 pp.
- Gopalakrishnakone, P. (1994). Sea Snake Toxinology. Singapore: NUS Press. ISBN 9971-69-193-0. 251 pp.
