= Sea snake =

Sea snake may refer to either of two groups of elapid snakes:

- Hydrophiini, the true sea snakes
- Laticauda, the sea kraits

== See also ==
- List of marine snakes
