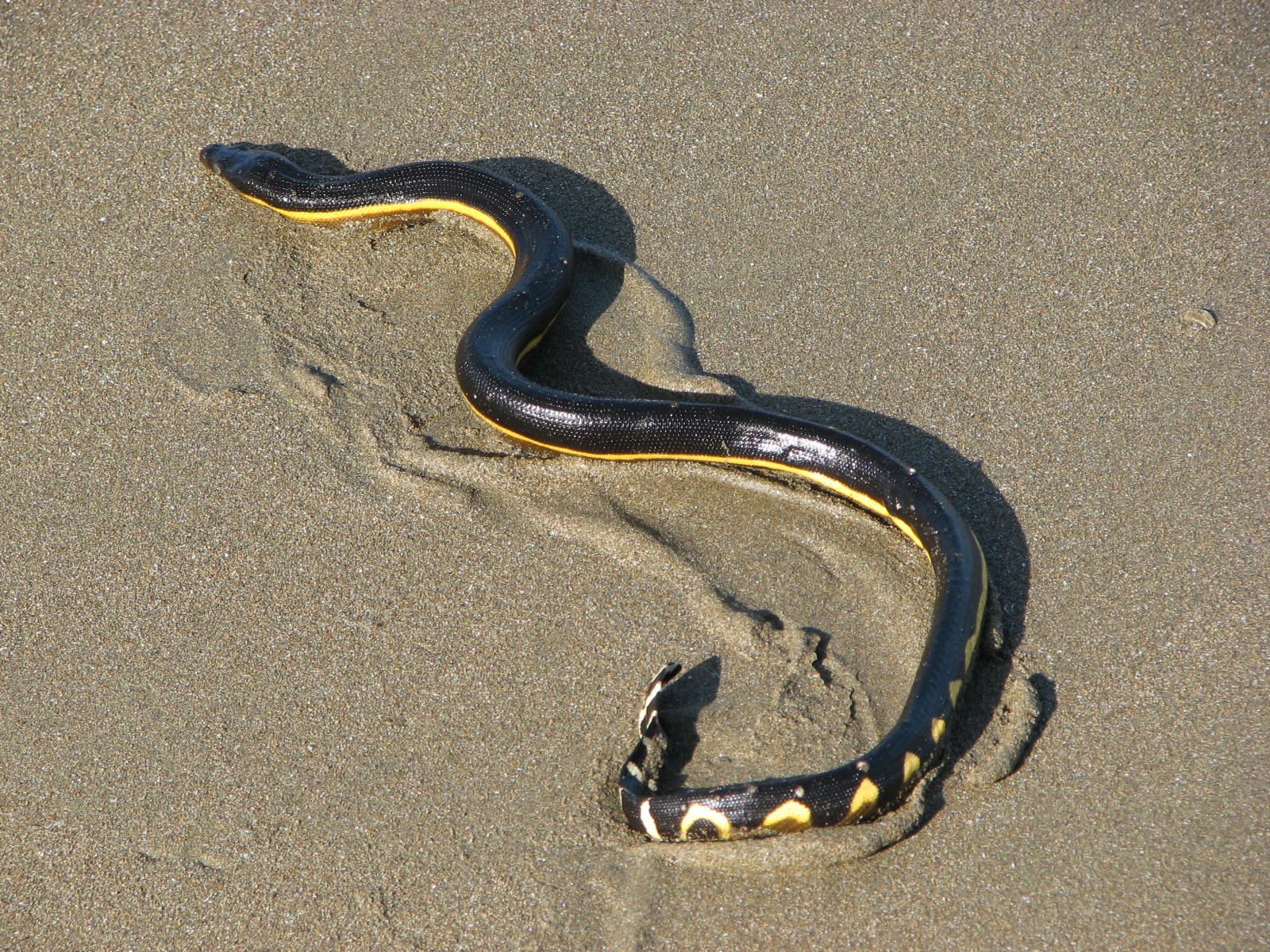
- Yellow-bellied sea snake (Hydrophis platurus) on a Costa Rica beach

Scientific classification
- Kingdom: Animalia
- Phylum: Chordata
- Class: Reptilia
- Order: Squamata
- Suborder: Serpentes
- Family: Elapidae
- Subfamily: Hydrophiinae
- Tribe: Hydrophiini; Fitzinger, 1843
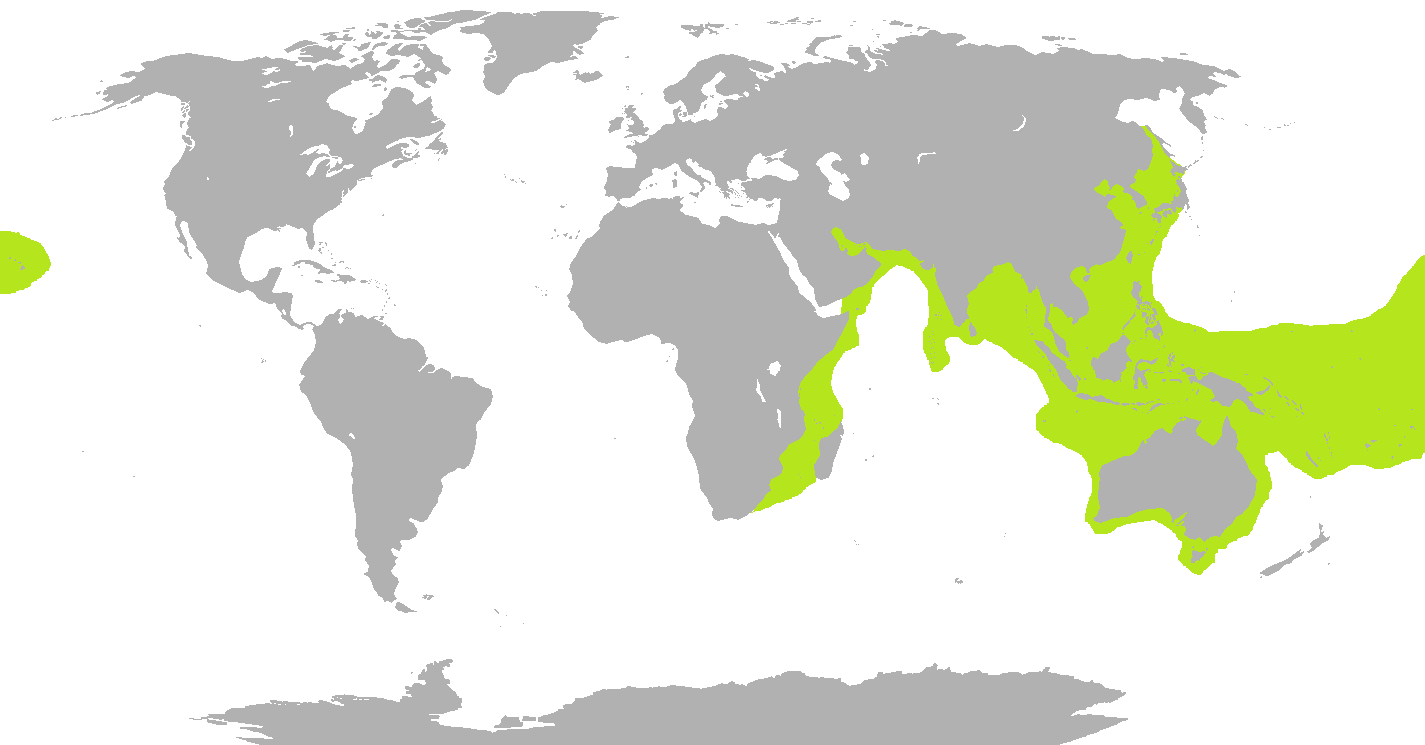
- Range of sea snakes shown in lime green, except the widespread, pelagic yellow-bellied sea snake

= Hydrophiini =

Clade of marine snakes

True sea snakes, viviparous sea snakes, or coral reef snakes (tribe Hydrophiini), are a group of elapid snakes that inhabit marine environments for most or all of their lives. They comprise 62 species divided among 15 genera.

Most sea snakes are venomous, except the genus Emydocephalus, which feeds almost exclusively on fish eggs. True sea snakes are extensively adapted to a fully aquatic life and are unable to move on land, unlike the sea kraits, which have limited land movement. They are found in warm coastal waters from the Indian Ocean to the Pacific and are closely related to venomous terrestrial snakes in Australia.

All sea snakes have paddle-like tails, and many have laterally compressed bodies that give them an eel-like appearance. Unlike fish, they do not have gills and must surface regularly to breathe. Along with cetaceans, they are among the most completely aquatic of all extant air-breathing vertebrates. Among this group are species with some of the most potent venoms of all snakes. Some have gentle dispositions and bite only when provoked, while others are much more aggressive.

== Description ==
The majority of adult sea snakes species grow to between 120 and 150 cm (4 and 5 ft) in length, with the largest, Hydrophis spiralis, reaching a maximum of 3 m (10 ft). Their eyes are relatively small with a round pupil and most have nostrils located dorsally. The skulls do not differ significantly from those of terrestrial elapids, although their dentition is relatively primitive, with short fangs and (with the exception of Emydocephalus) as many as 18 smaller teeth behind them on the maxilla.

Most sea snakes are completely aquatic and have adapted to sea environments in many ways, the most characteristic of which is a paddle-like tail that has improved their swimming ability. To a varying degree, the bodies of many species are laterally compressed, especially in the pelagic species. This has often caused the ventral scales to become reduced in size, and even difficult to distinguish from the adjoining scales. Their lack of ventral scales means they have become virtually helpless on land, but as they live out their entire lifecycles at sea, they do not need to leave the water.

Since a snake's tongue can fulfill its olfactory function more easily underwater, its action is short compared to that of terrestrial snake species. Only the forked tips protrude from the mouth through a divided notch in the middle of the rostral scale. The nostrils have valves consisting of a specialized spongy tissue to exclude water, and the windpipe can be drawn up to where the short nasal passage opens into the roof of the mouth. This is an important adaptation for an animal that must surface to breathe, but may have its head partially submerged when doing so. The lung has become very large and extends almost the entire length of the body, although the rear portion is thought to have developed to aid buoyancy rather than to exchange gases. The extended lung possibly also serves to store air for dives.

Most species of sea snakes can respire through the top of their skin. This is unusual for reptiles, because their skin is thick and scaly, but experiments with the black-and-yellow sea snake, Hydrophis platurus (a pelagic species), have shown this species can satisfy about 30% of its oxygen requirements in this manner, which allows for prolonged dives.

Like other land animals that have adapted to life in a marine environment, sea snakes ingest considerably more salt than their terrestrial relatives through their diets when seawater is inadvertently swallowed. Because of this, a more effective means of regulating the salt concentration of their blood is required. In sea snakes, the posterior sublingual glands, located under and around the tongue sheath, allow them to expel salt with their tongue action.

Scalation among sea snakes is highly variable. As opposed to terrestrial snake species that have imbricate scales to protect against abrasion, the scales of most pelagic sea snakes do not overlap. Reef-dwelling species, such as those in genus Aipysurus, do have imbricate scales to protect against the sharp coral. The scales themselves may be smooth, keeled, spiny, or granular, the latter often looking like warts. H. platurus has body scales that are "peg-like", while those on its tail are juxtaposed hexagonal plates.

== Sensory abilities ==
Vision, chemoreception (tongue-flicking), and hearing are important senses for terrestrial snakes, but these stimuli become distorted in water. The poor visibility, chemical dilution, and limitation of ground-borne vibrations under water suggest that sea snakes may have unique sensory abilities to compensate for the relative lack of other sensory cues.

The main olfactory system has been lost, and they are only able to detect smell through Jacobson's organ.

Relatively little is known about sea snake vision. A study of photoreceptors in the retina of spine-bellied, Hydrophis curtus, and horned, Hydrophis peronii, sea snakes found three classes of opsins all from cone cells. Despite the absence of rod cells in sea snake eyes, Simeos et al. found the rhodopsin (rh1), the opsin of the rods, still expressed suggesting that in sea snakes some cones may be transmuted rods. Behavioural observations indicate that vision has a limited role in catching prey and mate selection, but sound vibrations and chemoreception may be important. One study identified small sensory organs on the head of Hydrophis curtus similar to the mechanoreceptors in alligators and aquatic snake Acrochodus that are used to sense the movement of fish prey. Westhoff et al. recorded auditory brain responses to vibration underwater in Hydrophis curtus, which are sensitive enough to detect movement in prey, but were not as sensitive as fish lateral line systems. Similarly, vision appears to be of limited importance for finding mates. Shine experimented with applying skin secretions (pheromones) to snake-like objects to see if male turtle-headed sea snakes, Emydocephalus annulatus, are attracted to female pheromones. Shine found that although vision may be useful over short distances (less than 1 m [3 ft]), pheromones are more important once the male comes in physical contact with an object.

The olive sea snake, Aipysurus laevis, has been found to have photoreceptors in the skin of its tail, allowing it to detect light and presumably ensuring it is completely hidden, including its tail, inside coral holes during the day. While other species have not been tested, A. laevis possibly is not unique among sea snakes in this respect.

Other unique senses, such as electromagnetic reception and pressure detection, have been proposed for sea snakes, but scientific studies have yet to be performed to test these senses.

== Distribution and habitat ==
Sea snakes are mostly confined to the warm tropical waters of the Indian Ocean and the western Pacific Ocean, with a few species found well out into Oceania. The geographic range of one species, Hydrophis platurus, is wider than that of any other reptile species, except for a few species of sea turtles. It extends from the east coast of Africa, from Djibouti in the north to Cape Town in the south, across the Indian Ocean, the Pacific, south as far as the northern coast of New Zealand, all the way to the western coast of the Americas, where it occurs from northern Peru in the south (including the Galápagos Islands) to the Gulf of California in the north. Isolated specimens have been found as far north as San Diego and Oxnard in the United States.

Sea snakes do not occur in the Atlantic Ocean. H. platurus possibly would be found there were it not for the cold currents off Namibia and western South Africa that keep it from crossing into the eastern South Atlantic, or south of 5°S latitude along the South American west coast. Sea snakes do not occur in the Red Sea. A lack of salinity is also thought to be the reason why H. platurus has not crossed into the Caribbean via the Panama Canal.

Despite their marine adaptations, most sea snakes prefer shallow waters near land, around islands, and especially somewhat sheltered waters, as well as near estuaries. They may swim up rivers and have been reported as far as 160 km (100 mi) from the sea. Others, such as H. platurus, are pelagic and are found in drift lines, slicks of floating debris brought together by surface currents. Some sea snakes inhabit mangrove swamps and similar brackishwater habitats, and one landlocked freshwater species, Hydrophis semperi, occurs in Lake Taal in the Philippines.

== Behavior ==
Sea snakes are generally reluctant to bite, and are usually considered to be mild-tempered, although variation is seen among species and individuals. Some species, such as H. platurus, which feed by simply gulping down their prey, are more likely to bite when provoked because they seem to use their venom more for defense. Others use their venom for prey immobilization. Sea snakes are often handled without concern by local fishermen who unravel and toss them back into the water barehanded, usually without getting bitten, when the snakes frequently become entangled in fishing nets. Species reported as much more aggressive include Aipysurus laevis, Astrotia stokesii, Enhydrina schistosa, Enhydrina zweifeli, and Hydrophis ornatus.

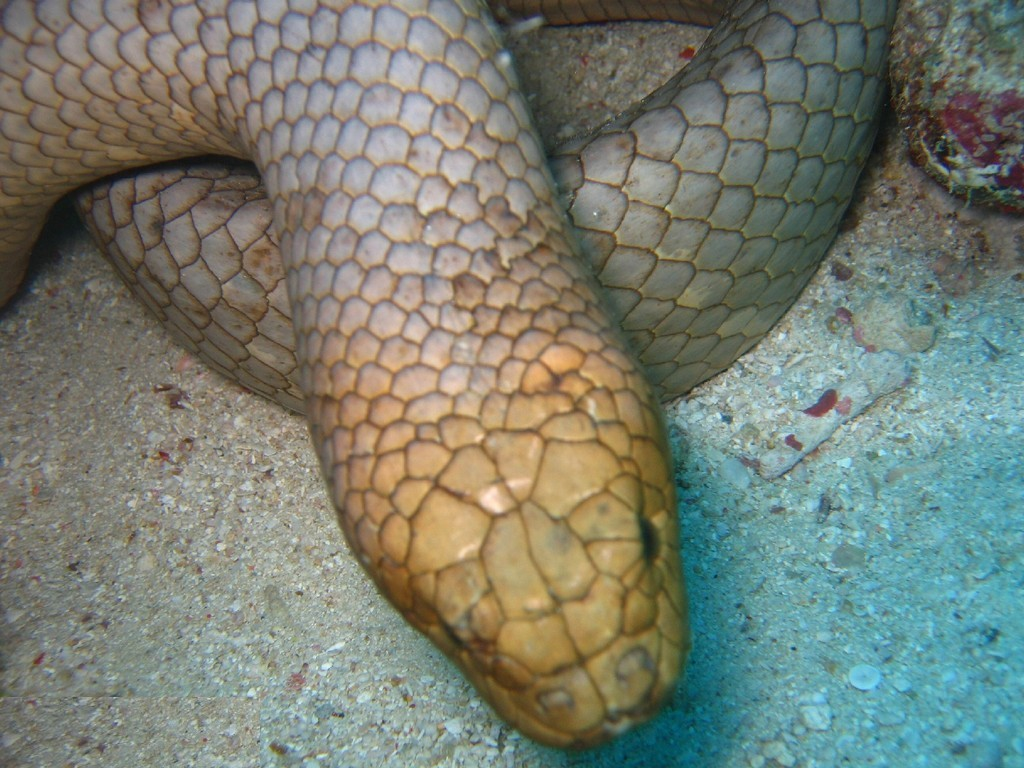
Olive sea snake, Aipysurus laevis

On land, their movements become very erratic. They crawl awkwardly in these situations and can become quite aggressive, striking wildly at anything that moves, although they are unable to coil and strike in the manner of terrestrial snakes.

Sea snakes appear to be active both day and night. In the morning, and sometimes late in the afternoon, they can be seen at the surface basking in the sunlight, and they dive when disturbed. They have been reported swimming at depths over 90 m (300 ft), and can remain submerged for as long as a few hours, possibly depending on temperature and degree of activity.

Sea snakes have been sighted in huge numbers. For example, in 1932, a steamer in the Strait of Malacca, off the coast of Malaysia, reported sighting "millions" of Hydrophis stokesii, a relative of H. platurus; these reportedly formed a line of snakes 3 m (10 ft) wide and 100 km (60 mi) long. The cause of this phenomenon is unknown, although it likely has to do with reproduction. They can sometimes be seen swimming in schools of several hundred, and many dead specimens have been found on beaches after typhoons.

== Ecology ==
Sea snakes feed on small fish and occasionally young octopus. They are often associated with the sea snake barnacle (Platylepas ophiophila), which attaches to their skin.

== Reproduction ==
All true sea snakes are ovoviviparous; the young are born alive in the water where they live their entire lives. In some species, the young are quite large, up to half as long as the mother.

== Venom ==
Like their relatives in the family Elapidae, the majority of sea snakes are highly venomous. They rarely inject their venom when biting, so venomous bites to humans are rare. For example, Hydrophis platurus has a venom more potent than any terrestrial snake species in Costa Rica based on LD_{50}, but despite its abundance in the waters off its western coast, few human fatalities have been reported. The death of a trawler fisherman in Australian waters during 2018 was reported to be the region's first sea snake fatality since a pearl diver was killed in 1935.

Bites in which envenomation does occur are usually painless and may not even be noticed when contact is made. Teeth may remain in the wound. Usually, little or no swelling occurs, and rarely are any nearby lymph nodes affected. The most important symptoms are rhabdomyolysis (rapid breakdown of skeletal muscle tissue) and paralysis. Early symptoms include headache, a thick-feeling tongue, thirst, sweating, and vomiting. The venom is very slow-acting, and symptoms that happen from as little as 30 minutes to several hours after the bite include generalized aching, stiffness, and tenderness of muscles all over the body. Passive stretching of the muscles is also painful, and trismus, which is similar to tetanus, is common. This is followed later on by symptoms typical of other elapid envenomations: a progressive flaccid paralysis, starting with ptosis and paralysis of voluntary muscles. Paralysis of muscles involved in swallowing and respiration can be fatal.

Vick et al (1975) estimated that the LD_{50} of three sea snake venoms (H. platurus, L. semifasciata and L. laticaudata) for a 70 kg human range from 7.7 to 21 mg. Data from the only sea snake venom study conducted in monkeys at that time suggested that primates were slightly more resistant to the venom effects on a dose response basis than mice. Ishikawa et al (1985) indicated a substantially lower binding affinity between sea snake neurotoxin and human and chimpanzee AChR's compared to that in other animals. In humans, the venom targets appear mainly to be the cell membranes of voluntary (skeletal) muscles and distal tubular portions of the kidney, including the loop of Henle, the second convoluted tubule and the collecting tubules. Sitprija et al (1973) found evidence of tubular necrosis throughout all portions of the renal tubules in two patients severely envenomated by sea snakes. Sea snake venoms in humans are thus more often myotoxic and/or nephrotoxic rather than neurotoxic.

== Taxonomy ==
Cladogram

- Elapidae
  - Cobra
  - Hydrophiinae
    - Laticauda
      (sea kraits)
    - - Notechis
      - Hydrophiini (true sea snakes)
        - - Emydocephalus
          - Aipysurus
        - - Hydrelaps
          - Hydrophis

Cladogram showing the basic evolutionary relationships among true sea snakes, sea kraits and other venomous terrestrial snakes. Sea kraits diverged earlier from the rest of Australasian elapids, in contrast, true sea snakes are more closely related to Australasian elapids then they are to sea kraits.

Sea snakes were at first regarded as a unified and separate family, the Hydrophiidae, that later came to comprise two subfamilies: the Hydrophiinae, or true/aquatic sea snakes (now 6 genera with 64 species), and the more primitive Laticaudinae, or sea kraits (one genus, Laticauda, with eight species). Eventually, as just how closely related the sea snakes are to the elapids became clear, the taxonomic situation became less well-defined. Some taxonomists responded by moving the sea snakes to the Elapidae. Most taxonomists now place the sea snakes in the elapid subfamilies Hydrophiinae and Laticaudinae, although the latter may be omitted if Laticauda is included in the Hydrophiinae. Unlike the traditional Hydrophiinae, the Hydrophiinae as currently seen also includes Australasian terrestrial elapids.

Genus	Taxon authority	Species	Subsp. (Note: Not counting the nominate subspecies)	Common name	Geographic range
Aipysurus	Lacépède, 1804	9	1	olive sea snakes	Timor Sea, South China Sea, Gulf of Thailand, and coasts of Australia (Northern Territory, Queensland, Western Australia), New Caledonia, Loyalty Islands, southern New Guinea, Indonesia, western Malaysia and Vietnam
Emydocephalus	Krefft, 1869	3	0	turtlehead sea snakes	the coasts of Timor (Indonesian Sea), New Caledonia, Australia (Northern Territory, Queensland, Western Australia), and in the Southeast Asian sea along the coasts of China, Taiwan, Japan, and the Ryukyu Islands
Ephalophis	M.A. Smith, 1931	1	0	Grey's mudsnake	northwestern Australia
Hydrelaps	Boulenger, 1896	1	0	Port Darwin mudsnake	northern Australia, southern New Guinea
Hydrophis	Latreille in Sonnini & Latreille, 1801	49	3	sea snakes	Indo-Australian and Southeast Asian waters.
Parahydrophis	Burger & Natsuno, 1974	1	0	northern mangrove sea snake	northern Australia, southern New Guinea

=== Molecular studies ===
Molecular data studies suggest all three monotypic semiaquatic genera (Ephalophis, Parahydrophis and Hydrelaps) are early diverging lineages. Studies additionally suggest that several other monotypic genera are instead members of Hydrophis.

== Captivity ==
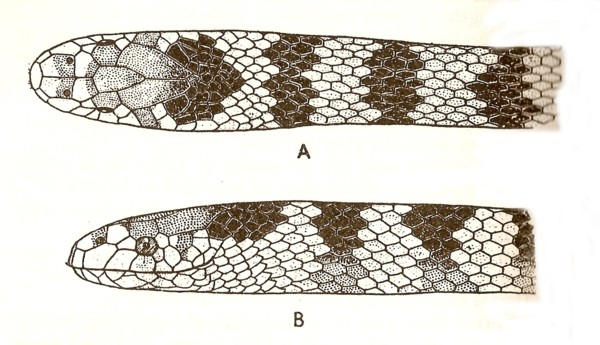
Hydrophis cyanocinctus

At best, sea snakes make difficult captives. Ditmars (1933) described them as nervous and delicate captives that usually refuse to eat, preferring only to hide in the darkest corner of the tank. Over 50 years later, Mehrtens wrote in 1987 that although they were rarely displayed in Western zoological parks, some species were regularly on display in Japanese aquariums. The available food supply limits the number of species that can be kept in captivity, since some have diets that are too specialized. Also, some species appear intolerant of handling, or even being removed from the water. Species that have done relatively well in captivity include the ringed sea snake, Hydrophis cyanocinctus, which feeds on fish and eels in particular. Hydrophis platurus has done especially well in captivity, accepting small fish, including goldfish. Housing them in round tanks, or in rectangular tanks with well-rounded corners, prevents snakes from damaging their snouts on the sides.

== Conservation status ==
Most sea snakes are not on the CITES protection lists. Several species of Aipysurus are listed as threatened: the Timor species A. fuscus is known to be endangered, and two others found in seas north of Australia, the leaf-scaled A. foliosquama and short-nosed A. apraefrontalis, are classified as critically endangered according to the IUCN Red List of Threatened Species.

== See also ==
- List of marine reptiles
- Snakebite
- Sea serpent
