= Thomas Hardwicke =

British general and naturalist

Thomas Hardwicke FRS
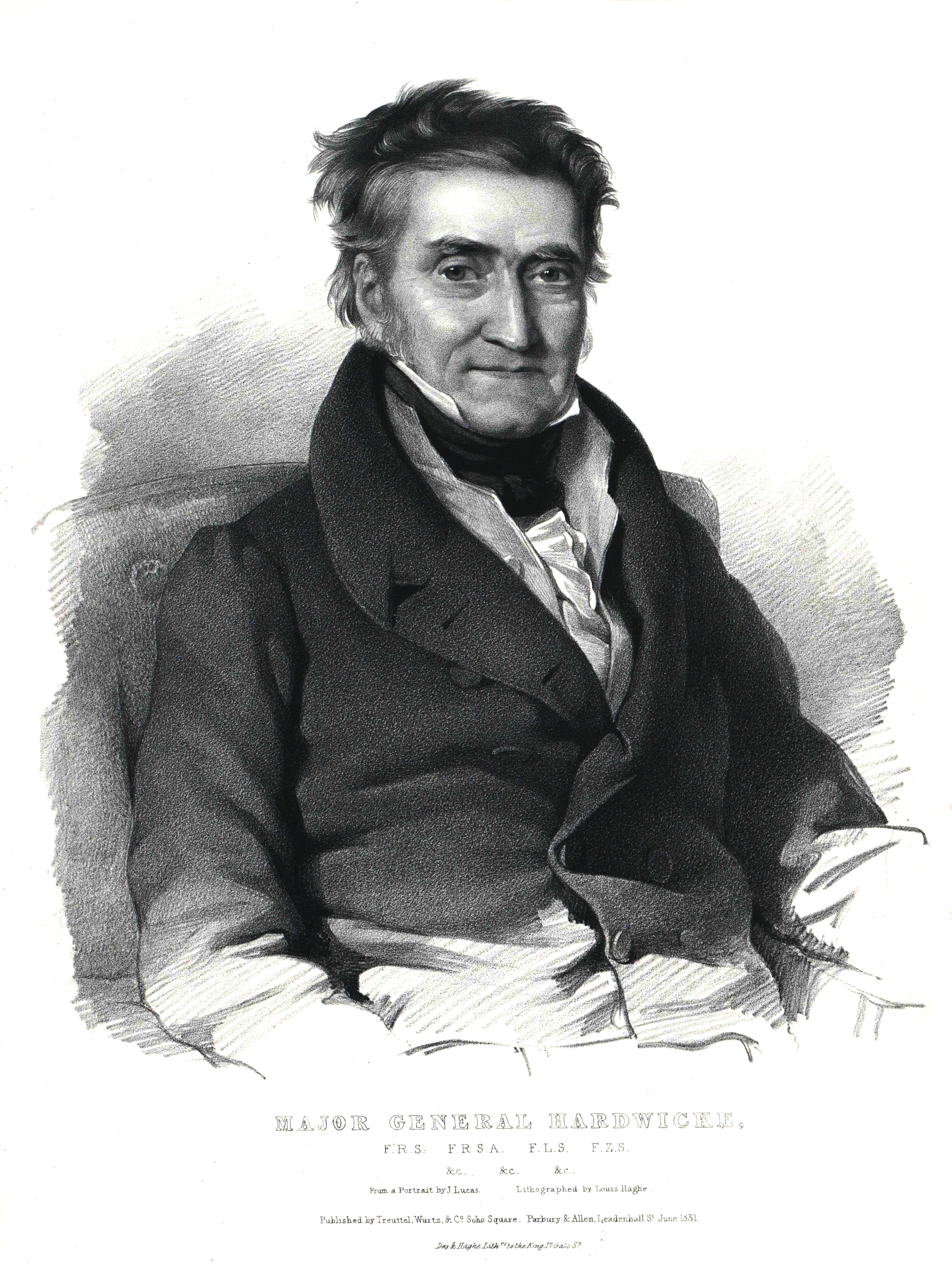
- Born: 1756
- Died: 3 March 1835 (aged about 78); Lambeth, London
- Known for: Collection of drawings of Indian animals
- Scientific career
- Fields: Soldier, zoologist
- Institutions: British East India Company army
- Author abbrev. (botany): Hardw.
- Author abbrev. (zoology): Hardwicke

Major-General Thomas Hardwicke (1756 – 3 March 1835) was an English soldier and naturalist who was in India from 1777 to 1823. He collected numerous specimens of natural history and had them painted by Indian artists. From these paintings many new species were described. Several of these species are named after him. On returning to England he collaborated with the zoologist John Edward Gray to publish Illustrations of Indian Zoology (1830–1835).

== Biography ==
Hardwicke joined the British East India Company army with the Bengal Artillery as a Lieutenant Fireworker on 3 November 1778. He was posted in southern India from 1781 to 1785 serving under Colonel Pearce and Sir Eyre Coote. He was in the field during the campaign against Tipu Sultan in 1790–1792. He saw action in the Relief of Vellore (10 January 1782), the Siege of Cuddalore (June 1783) and in the Rohilla Campaign (26 October 1794). He was wounded at Satyamangalam on 13 September 1790 and was posted as a Company Orderly at Bangalore before moving to Bengal in 1793 to become Adjutant and Quartermaster of Artillery. Hardwicke rose to become Major-General in 1819. He resigned from the command of the Bengal Artillery in 1823 to return to England and died at The Lodge, Lambeth, on 3 March 1835.

During his military career in India, Hardwicke travelled extensively over the subcontinent. He started collecting zoological specimens in these travels and amassed a large collection of paintings of animals which he got local artists to make. Most paintings were made from dead specimens, but many were also drawn from life. When he left India, he had the largest collection of drawings of Indian animals ever formed by an individual. Some drawings were also made by his daughter Elizabeth (between 1811 and 1815 – it was her poor health that led Hardwicke to leave India).

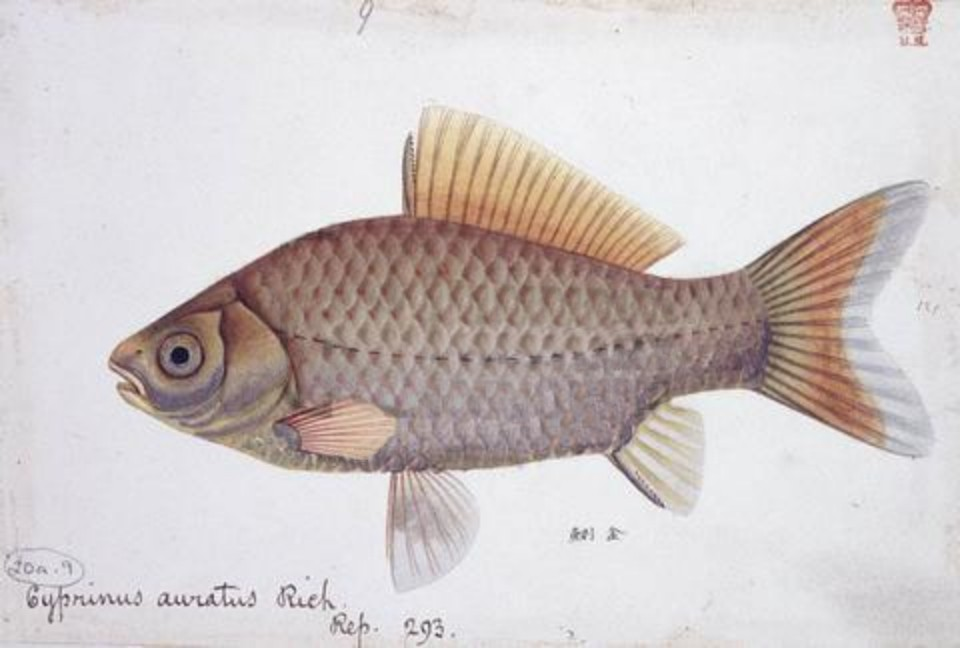
Carassius auratus

The Indian artists employed by Hardwicke are unknown, except for one Goordial, but they were trained and their style was adapted to the demands of technical illustration using watercolours. The collection was bequeathed to the British Museum in 1835 which was later partly moved to the Natural History Museum. The collection consists of 4500 illustrations.

Hardwicke's enthusiasm for the natural history of India was matched by the leading naturalists in England, with whom he corresponded. He was in contact with Sir Joseph Banks, President of the Royal Society, and Hardwicke himself became a fellow of the Royal Society in 1813. His collections of illustrations were used by zoologists like J. E. Gray. The two volume Illustrations of Indian Zoology was published with Hardwicke's financing, containing 202 large hand-coloured plates, but he died before the textual part was produced. Gray described and named many of the species in the work except for some of the testudines which were named on the basis of the manuscripts of Thomas Bell. Some drawings of shells and plants which were part of the collections he bequeathed were probably made by his sister. Hardwicke also collected botanical drawings and 16 volumes of illustrations of Plants of India and about 136 drawings of fungi are in the British Library in London.

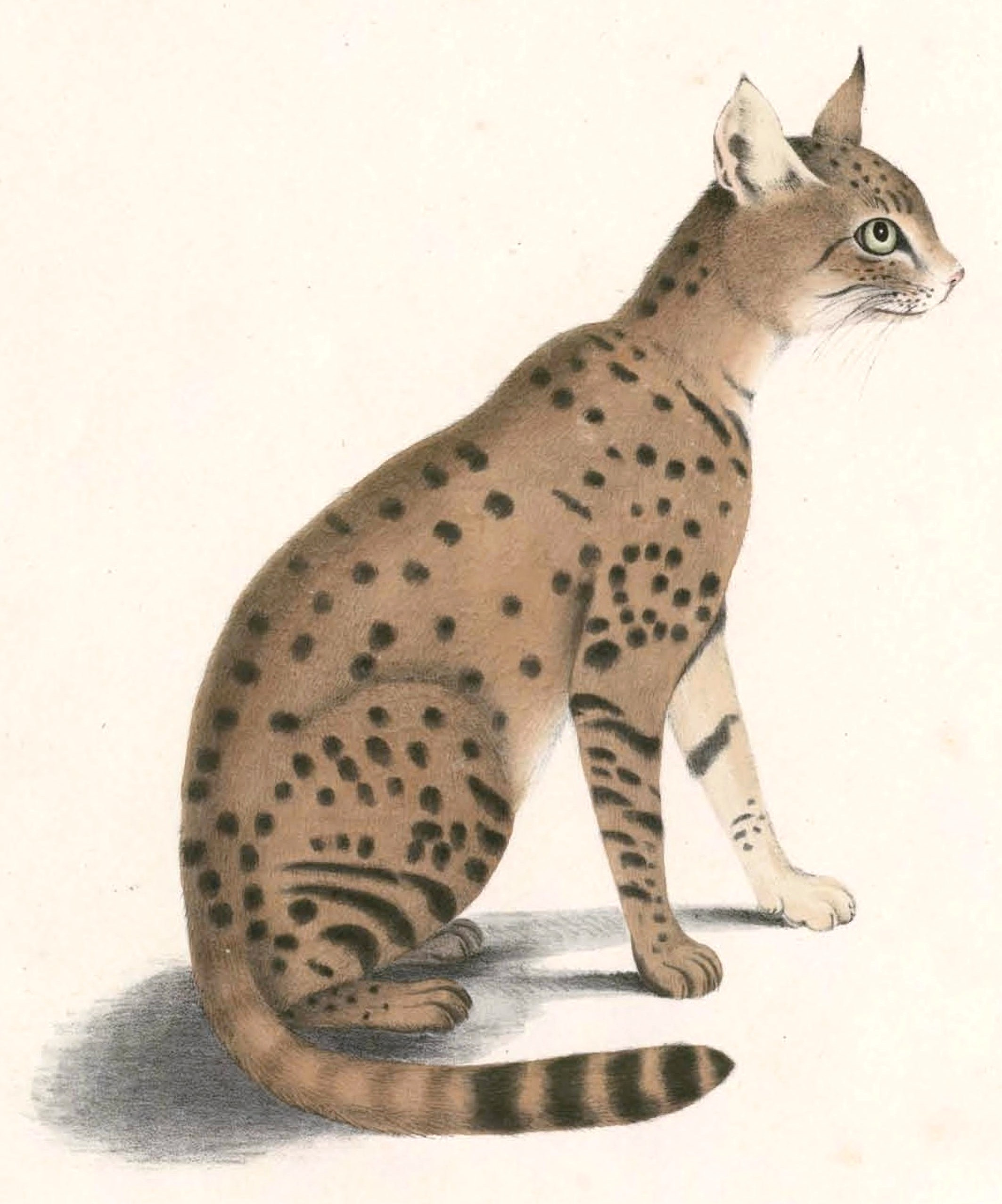
Felis silvestris ornata

Hardwicke was elected Fellow of the Royal Society on 8 April 1813 and Fellow of the Linnean Society on 20 March 1804. He also held positions of vice-president to the Asiatic Society of Bengal and was an honorary member of the Royal Dublin Society. Hardwicke was not married but had three illegitimate daughters and two sons apart from two daughters born to an Indian mistress (named as Fyzbuhsh in his Will).

Several species named to commemorate his work as ornithologist, naturalist and zoologist:

- Parnassius hardwickii – common blue Apollo
- Temera hardwickii – finless sleeper ray
- Solegnathus hardwickii – Hardwicke's pipefish, pallid seahorse
- Thalassoma hardwicke – sixbar wrasse, six-banded wrasse
- Eublepharis hardwickii – East Indian leopard gecko, Hardwicke's gecko
- Saara hardwickii – Hardwicke's spiny-tailed lizard, Indian spiny-tailed lizard
- Hydrophis hardwickii – spine-bellied sea snake, Hardwicke's sea snake
- Chloropsis hardwickii – orange-bellied leafbird
- Gallinago hardwickii – Latham's snipe, Japanese snipe
- Kerivoula hardwickii – Hardwicke's woolly bat
- Rhinopoma hardwickii – lesser mouse-tailed bat, Hardwicke's lesser mouse-tailed bat, long-tailed bat

The genus of a tree known for its hard wood, Hardwickia binata, was named after him by William Roxburgh.
