= S. robustus =

S. robustus may refer to:

- Sclerobunus robustus, a harvestman species that occurs in the United States
- Scotophilus robustus, the robust yellow bat, a vesper bat species found only in Madagascar
- Sinocyclocheilus robustus, a ray-finned fish species
- Solegnathus robustus, the robust pipehorse, a fish species endemic to Australia
- Spratelloides robustus, the blue sprat, fringe-scale round herring, blue bait or blue sardine, a sprat fish species
- Sylvilagus robustus, the robust cottontail or Davis Mountains cottontail, a cottontail rabbit species endemic to four mountain ranges in the southwestern United States and adjacent Mexico

== Synonyms ==
- Sason robustus, a synonym for Sason robustum, a trapdoor spider species only found in southern India, Sri Lanka and the Seychelles
- Scartomyzon robustus, a synonym for Moxostoma robustum, the robust redhorse or smallfin redhorse, a freshwater fish species of the eastern United States
