= Aipysurus mosaicus =

Conservation status
- Least Concern (IUCN 3.1)

Scientific classification
- Kingdom: Animalia
- Phylum: Chordata
- Class: Reptilia
- Order: Squamata
- Suborder: Serpentes
- Family: Elapidae
- Genus: Aipysurus
- Species: A. mosaicus

Binomial name
- Aipysurus mosaicus Sanders, Rasmussen, Elmberg, Mumpuni, Guinea, Blias, Lee & Fry, 2012

Species of snake

Aipysurus mosaicus is a species of snake found in coastal seas of Australia. It is commonly known as the mosaic sea snake.

== Taxonomy ==
Aipysurus mosaicus Sanders, Rasmussen, Elmberg, Mumpuni, Guinea, Blias, Lee & Fry was first described in 2012. The population had previously been identified as a geographically isolated group of Aipysurus eydouxii, found near New Guinea and the Sunda shelf, but comparison of internal and external characters and examination of molecular evidence showed significant divergence in the phylogeny and supported the separation to a new species. Type specimen was collected near Weipa in the Gulf of Carpentaria.

== Description ==
An oceanic egg-eating snake of the elapid family, venomous predators found in seas and at terrestrial habitat.

== Distribution and habitat ==
The distribution range of the species extends across coastal waters of northern Australia and New Guinea.
