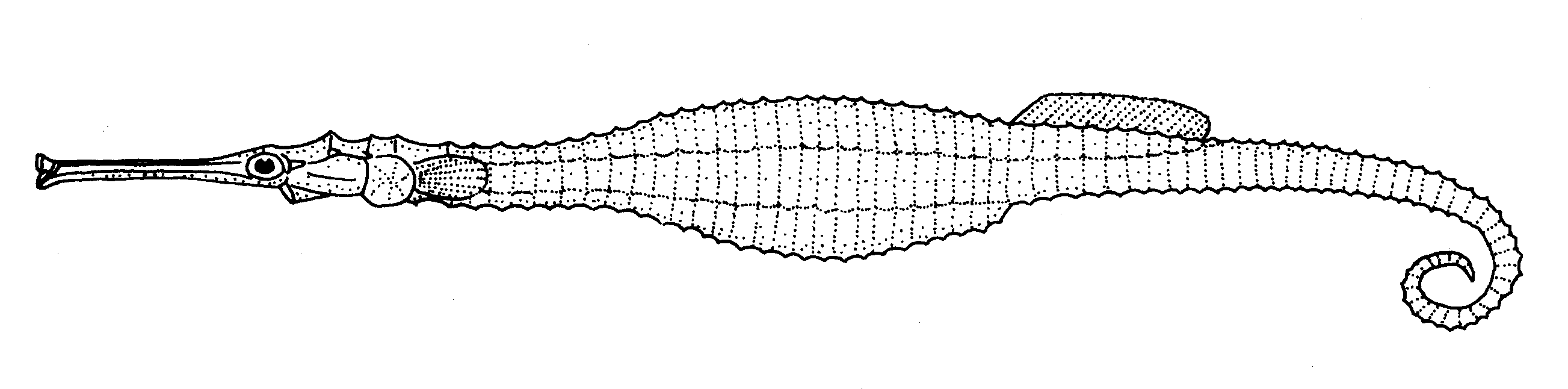
- Spiny pipehorse, Solegnathus spinosissimus. Drawing by Dr Tony Ayling

Scientific classification
- Domain: Eukaryota
- Kingdom: Animalia
- Phylum: Chordata
- Class: Actinopterygii
- Order: Syngnathiformes
- Family: Syngnathidae
- Subfamily: Syngnathinae
- Genus: Solegnathus; Swainson, 1839

Type species
- Syngnathus hardwickii Gray, 1830

Species
- See text.

Synonyms
- Castelnauina Fowler, 1908; Runcinatus Whitley, 1929

= Solegnathus =

Genus of fishes

Solegnathus is a genus of pipehorse native to the Indian and Pacific Oceans.

== Species ==
There are currently five recognized species in this genus:

- Solegnathus dunckeri Whitley, 1927 (Duncker's pipehorse)
- Solegnathus hardwickii (J. E. Gray, 1830) (Hardwicke's pipefish)
- Solegnathus lettiensis Bleeker, 1860 (Günther's pipehorse)
- Solegnathus robustus McCulloch, 1911 (Robust pipehorse)
- Solegnathus spinosissimus (Günther, 1870) (Spiny pipehorse)
