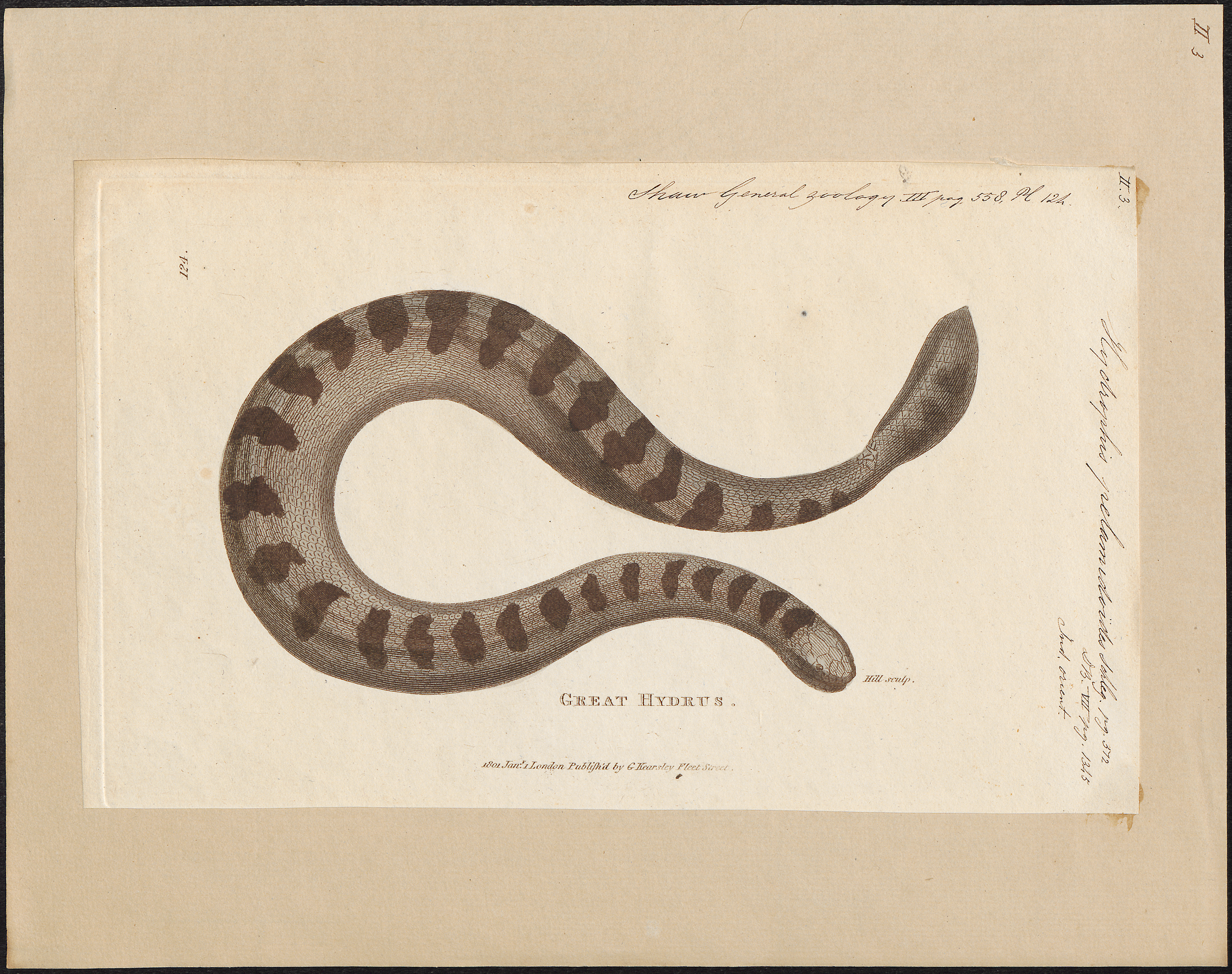

Conservation status
- Least Concern (IUCN 3.1)

Scientific classification
- Kingdom: Animalia
- Phylum: Chordata
- Class: Reptilia
- Order: Squamata
- Suborder: Serpentes
- Family: Elapidae
- Genus: Hydrophis
- Species: H. curtus

Binomial name
- Hydrophis curtus (Shaw, 1802)

= Hydrophis curtus =

Species of snake

Hydrophis curtus, also known as Shaw's Sea Snake, short sea snake, but often includes Hydrophis hardwickii is a species of sea snake. Like most Hydrophiinae sea snakes, it is a viviparous, fully marine, and front fanged elapid that is highly venomous. It is collected for a variety of purposes including human and animal food, for medicinal purposes and for their skin.

== Description ==
This species is characterized by a wide variation in number of ventral scales and degree of parietal scale fragmentation. Both sexes possess spiny scales along their bodies but males have more highly developed spines. This sexual dimorphism in spines may play a role in courtship or in locomotion by reducing drag.

== Distribution ==
It is a widely distributed species and like most sea snakes is restricted to warmer, tropical waters. Its range includes:

- Persian Gulf (Oman, Bahrain, United Arab Emirates, Iran)
- Indian Ocean (Bangladesh, Pakistan, Sri Lanka, India)
- South China Sea (north to the coasts of Fujian and Shandong)
- Strait of Taiwan
- Indo-Australian Archipelago
- North Coast of Australia (Northern Territory, Queensland, Western Australia)
- Philippines (Panay)
- Pacific Ocean (Myanmar, Thailand, Indonesia, China, Japan, New Guinea)
- Andaman & Nicobar Islands, Cambodia and Singapore

== Taxonomy ==
Originally considered to be two species of the genus Hydrophis: Hydrophis curtus and Hydrophis hardwickii. Gritis and Voris (1990) examined the morphological variation of over 1,400 specimens across its geographic range and concluded it is most likely a single species. As is convention, the species name reverts to the first description by Shaw in 1802. DNA and morphological analysis restored its phylogenic status as a single species. An analysis of the population in 2014 found strong evidence of deep divergence and genetic isolation across the geographical range, supporting a division of the species to Indian Ocean and West Pacific groups and high likelihood of cryptic taxa within those groups.

== Hydrodynamic sense ==
They have corpuscles (scale sensillae) concentrated on the front of their head which may be a hydrodynamic receptor. A study measuring brain response to water vibration found that L. curtus is sensitive to low amplitude (100–150 Hz) water motions. Sensing water motion is useful in locating prey, predators, or potential mates and has been demonstrated in other aquatic animals (e.g. lateral line in fish, whiskers in harbour seals).
