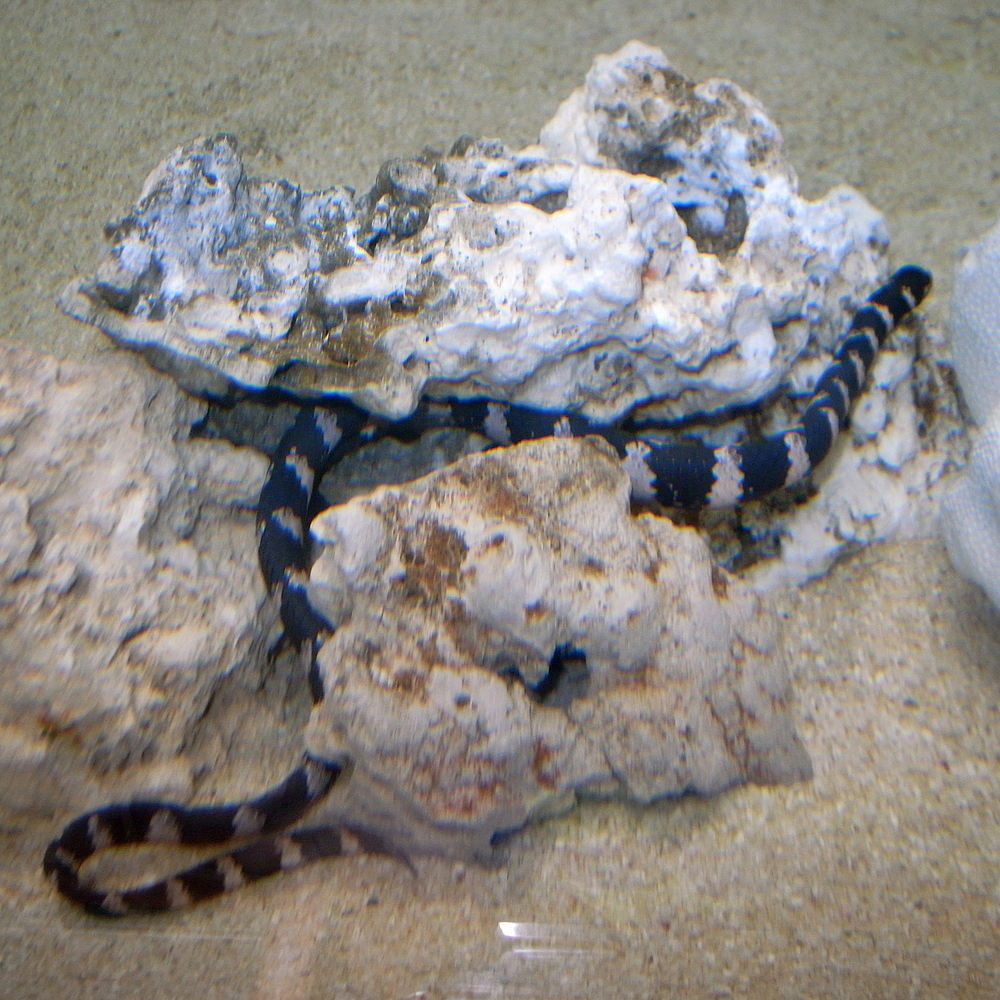

Conservation status
- Least Concern (IUCN 3.1)

Scientific classification
- Kingdom: Animalia
- Phylum: Chordata
- Class: Reptilia
- Order: Squamata
- Suborder: Serpentes
- Family: Elapidae
- Genus: Emydocephalus
- Species: E. ijimae

Binomial name
- Emydocephalus ijimae Stejneger, 1898

= Emydocephalus ijimae =

Species of snake

Emydocephalus ijimae, commonly known as Ijima's sea snake and turtlehead sea snake, is a species of snake in the family Elapidae. The species occurs in East Asia, in the shallow coastal waters of the north-western Pacific Ocean. E. ijimae feeds exclusively on the eggs of coral reef fishes, which makes it an important predator for maintaining a healthy coral reef ecosystem.

== Etymology ==
The specific name, ijimae, is in honor of Japanese zoologist Isao Ijima (1861–1921).

== Geographic range ==
E. ijimae is found off the coasts of China, Japan (including the Ryukyu Islands), and Taiwan.

== Sex and growth ==
E. ijimae exhibits sexual size dimorphism with males reaching a snout-to-vent length (SVL) typically less than 75 cm (30 in) and females sometimes exceeding 80 cm (31 in). Females also have a larger body weight (BW) of 170–600 g (6.0–21.2 oz) compared to the males which weigh 70–350 g (2.5–12.3 oz). The female BW also experiences greater fluctuations than the male BW. Adult males typically see an increase in BW from early spring to late summer and females occasionally undergo a rapid BW decrease from late autumn to early spring followed by a steady weight regain.

SVL in newborn E. ilijmae is 266–342 mm (10.5–13.5 in). Neonate males have been reported to grow 0.27 mm/day while neonate females grow 0.36 mm/day. The snakes reach maturity around the same age: Between 19 and 28 months for males and between 19 and 26 months for females.

== Reproduction ==
E. ijimae is viviparous. Neonates begin reproductive activity in the second or third summer and third spring after birth. Studies have suggested that E. ijimae is an income breeder that relies on temporal energy intake to produce offspring.
