= Emydocephalus orarius =

Scientific classification
- Kingdom: Animalia
- Phylum: Chordata
- Class: Reptilia
- Order: Squamata
- Suborder: Serpentes
- Family: Elapidae
- Genus: Emydocephalus
- Species: E. orarius

Binomial name
- Emydocephalus orarius Nankivell et al., 2020

Species of Australian snake

Emydocephalus orarius, also known as the white-crowned or white-naped sea snake, is a species of sea snake endemic to Australian waters. The specific epithet orarius (“coastal”) refers to its known habitat.

== Description ==
The species grows up to 116 cm in length.

== Distribution and habitat ==
The species has been recorded from soft-bottomed waters off the Kimberley, Pilbara and Gascoyne coasts of Western Australia, including Barrow and Legendre Islands. The type locality is Shark Bay.
