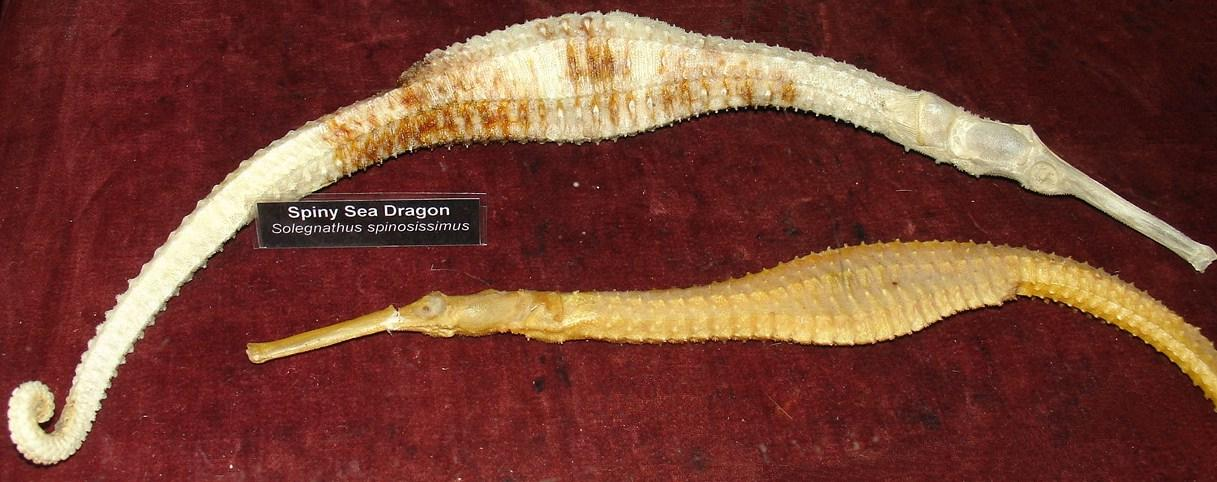

Conservation status
- Data Deficient (IUCN 3.1)

Scientific classification
- Kingdom: Animalia
- Phylum: Chordata
- Class: Actinopterygii
- Order: Syngnathiformes
- Family: Syngnathidae
- Genus: Solegnathus
- Species: S. spinosissimus

Binomial name
- Solegnathus spinosissimus (Günther, 1870)

Synonyms
- Solenognathus spinosissimus Günther, 1870; Solenognathus fasciatus Günther, 1880; Solegnathus fasciatus

= Spiny pipehorse =

Species of fish

The spiny pipehorse (Solegnathus spinosissimus) is a pipefish of the family Syngnathidae, found in the southwest Pacific Ocean on rocky or coral reefs to depths of 230 metres (750 ft). Length is up to 50 centimetres (20 in).

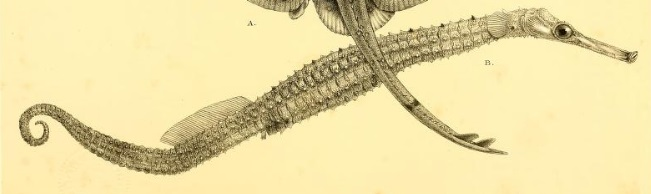
