= Aipysurus fuscus =

Conservation status
- Endangered (IUCN 3.1)

Scientific classification
- Kingdom: Animalia
- Phylum: Chordata
- Class: Reptilia
- Order: Squamata
- Suborder: Serpentes
- Family: Elapidae
- Genus: Aipysurus
- Species: A. fuscus

Binomial name
- Aipysurus fuscus (Tschudi, 1837)

Synonyms
- Stephanohydra fusca Tschudi, 1837

Species of snake

Aipysurus fuscus, commonly known as the dusky sea snake or Timor Reef snake, is a species of sea snake in the family Elapidae. It is found in the Timor Sea between Australia, Indonesia, and Timor-Leste and has been classified as endangered.

== Description and taxonomy ==
A. fuscus tends to be dark, colored purplish brown, brown, or blackish brown above. It occasionally has paler bands on the lower flanks. The center of each lateral scale is occasionally darker, giving the appearance of longitudinal striations. It is a member of the subfamily Hydrophiinae, or marine elapid snakes. The species name of A. fuscus derives from the Latin term fuscus, which translates to "dusky" or "dark", in reference to the snake's coloration. The species is thought to not usually grow beyond 78 centimeters (31 in) in length, although substantially larger specimens have been found. It is thought to reach reproductive maturity after three or four years, have an average generation time of five years, and an average lifespan of ten.

== Behavior and ecology ==
The snake is venomous. It is also viviparous, or live-bearing. A 2006 study suggested that it was most closely related to Aipysurus laevis, with which it has been documented as hybridizing. It has been recorded as feeding on fish eggs and eels, as well as on wrasses and gobies. The species has a shallow depth range, generally from the surface down to 12 meters (39 ft).

== Habitat and distribution ==
A. fuscus primarily inhabits reefs in shallow marine habitats in the Australian external territory of the Ashmore and Cartier Islands in the Timor Sea. It has occasionally been recorded at depths of up to 30 metres (98 ft). The only reliable reports of this species in the wild are from the reefs of Ashmore, Cartier, Hibernia, Scott and Seringapatam. Not more than five subpopulations are thought to exist, and the overall population is severely fragmented. The type specimen was reported as being collected off the coast of Sulawesi, but this location has been called into question. This, combined with the observation that the species only uses a small depth range, has led the International Union for Conservation of Nature to conclude that the snake has a range of less than 500 square kilometers (190 sq mi).

== Conservation status ==
Catch rates for the species declined drastically between 1998 and 2007, in which year no specimens were found. The estimated decline in the population of A. fuscus is at least 70%. The specific threats to this snake are poorly understood, but they are suspected to have been affected by coral bleaching and general decreases in the health of their ecosystems. These data have led to its being classified as endangered. Ashmore reef, one of five inhabited by A. fuscus, has been a nature reserve since 1983.
