= Aipysurus tenuis =

Conservation status
- Data Deficient (IUCN 3.1)

Scientific classification
- Kingdom: Animalia
- Phylum: Chordata
- Class: Reptilia
- Order: Squamata
- Suborder: Serpentes
- Family: Elapidae
- Genus: Aipysurus
- Species: A. tenuis

Binomial name
- Aipysurus tenuis Lönnberg & Andersson, 1913

Synonyms
- Oceanius tenuis

Species of Australian snake

Aipysurus tenuis, also known as the Arafura sea snake, Mjoberg's sea snake, or brown-lined sea snake, is a species of venomous snake in the family Elapidae that is native to Australia. The specific epithet tenuis ("slender") refers to the snake's appearance.

== Description ==
The species grows to an average of about 130 cm in length. It is long and slim, with a small, brown head and a pale body.

== Behaviour ==
The species is viviparous.

== Distribution ==
The snake is found in marine waters off the north-west coast of Western Australia, from near Dampier to Broome, and in the Arafura Sea. The type locality is Cape Jaubert, near Broome.
