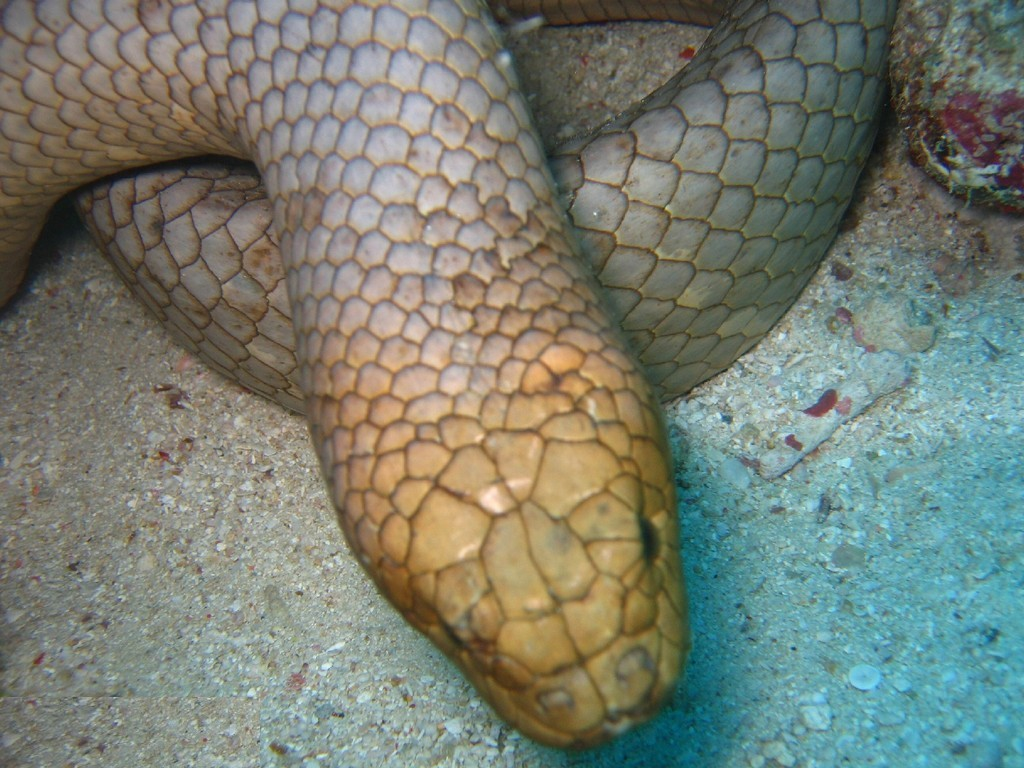
- Aipysurus laevis

Scientific classification
- Kingdom: Animalia
- Phylum: Chordata
- Class: Reptilia
- Order: Squamata
- Suborder: Serpentes
- Family: Elapidae
- Subfamily: Hydrophiinae
- Genus: Aipysurus; Lacépède, 1804

= Aipysurus =

Genus of snakes

Aipysurus (Note: From the Greek aipys "high and steep" and oura "tail"; the term loosely meaning "high tail" was coined to denote "the laterally compressed tail that is higher than the depth of the body".) is a genus of venomous snakes in the subfamily Hydrophiinae of the family Elapidae. Member species of the genus are found in warm seas from the Indian Ocean to the Pacific Ocean.

== Taxonomy ==
The first description of the genus Aipysurus was published by Bernard Germain de Lacépède in 1804, accommodating his description of a new species found in Australian seas, Aipysurus laevis, the type species of the genus. The description was accompanied by an illustration of the new species. The genus is one of a small group of the viviparous sea snakes (Hydrophiinae: Hydrophiini) with Emydocephalus, also mostly restricted to the seas between Timor, New Guinea, and northern Australia.

These species are recognised in the genus Aipysurus:

Image	Species	Authority	Common name	Geographic range
	Aipysurus apraefrontalis	M.A. Smith, 1926	Short-nosed sea snake	Western Australia
	Aipysurus duboisii	Bavay, 1869	Reef shallows sea snake; Dubois' sea snake	coastal areas of Australia
	Aipysurus eydouxii	(Gray, 1849)	Spine-tailed sea snake; Marbled sea snake; Beaded sea snake	Western Australia, Northern Territory, Queensland, the South China Sea, the Gulf of Thailand, Indonesia, Peninsular Malaysia, Vietnam and New Guinea
	Aipysurus foliosquama	M.A. Smith, 1926	Leaf-scaled sea snake	Ashmore and Cartier Islands
	Aipysurus fuscus	(Tschudi, 1837)	Dusky sea snake	Timor Sea between Australia, Indonesia and East Timor
	Aipysurus laevis	Lacépède, 1804	Olive-brown sea snake; Olive sea snake	Great Barrier Reef
	Aipysurus mosaicus	Sanders et al., 2012	Mosaic sea snake	Northern Australia and New Guinea
	Aipysurus pooleorum	Smith, 1974	Shark Bay sea snake	Western Australia, midwest coast (Shark Bay)
	Aipysurus tenuis	Lönnberg & Andersson, 1913	Arafura sea snake	Western Australia, from near Dampier to Broome, and in the Arafura Sea

Nota bene: A binomial authority in parentheses indicates that the species was originally described in a genus other than Aipysurus.

A subspecies nominated in 1974 as A. laevis pooleorum was elevated in 1983 to full species status, as A. pooleorum, without explanation by the authors. The same revision (Wells and Wellington, 1983) also resurrected the species name Aipysurus jukesii (Gray, 1846), recognised as a synonym of Lacépède's Aipysurus laevis.
