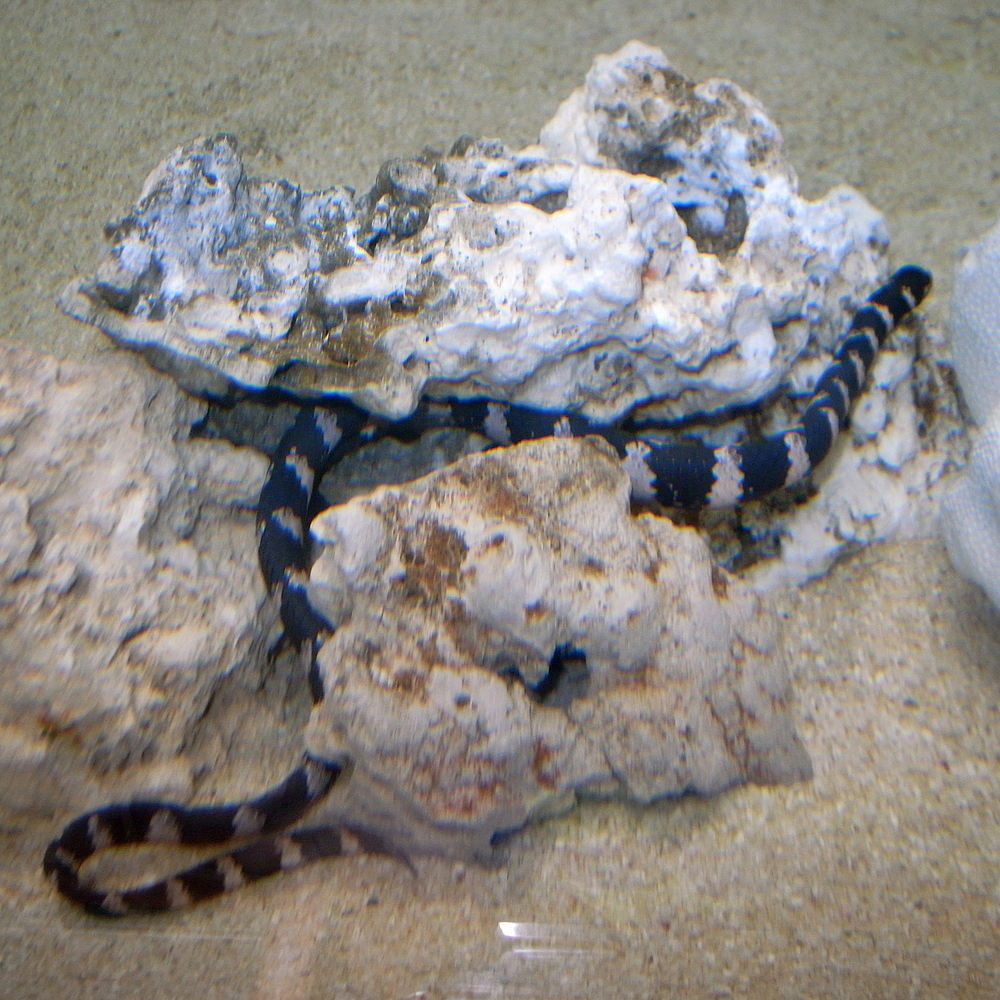
- Emydocephalus ijimae

Scientific classification
- Kingdom: Animalia
- Phylum: Chordata
- Class: Reptilia
- Order: Squamata
- Suborder: Serpentes
- Family: Elapidae
- Subfamily: Hydrophiinae
- Genus: Emydocephalus; Krefft, 1869

Species
- Three recognized species, see article.

= Emydocephalus =

Genus of snakes

Emydocephalus is a genus of sea snakes, also known as turtle-headed sea snakes, in the family Elapidae. The genus is one of a small group of the viviparous sea snakes (Hydrophiinae: Hydrophiini) with Aipysurus. Unlike most sea snakes, the species that make up Emydocephalus lack teeth on their dentary and palatine bones. They also lack venom, making them the only non-venomous elapids. The dentary and palantine bones bear only a row of papillae. Emydocephalus does, however, bear fangs and many small pterygoid teeth. This reduced dentition is due to their diet consisting almost entirely of fish eggs. Due to their prey being small and immobile, they exhibit a foraging strategy different from most snakes, where they forage more frequently but consume smaller quantities.

== Etymology ==
The generic name, Emydocephalus, is from the Greek words ὲμύς (emys) meaning "turtle", and κεφαλή (kephale) meaning "head".

== Geographic range ==
Species of the genus Emydocephalus are found in East Asia, Southeast Asia, and Australasia.

== Species ==
Emydocephalus has three recognized species.

- Emydocephalus annulatus Krefft, 1869 - turtle-headed sea snake, egg-eating sea snake
- Emydocephalus ijimae Stejneger, 1898 - turtlehead sea snake
- Emydocephalus orarius Nankivell, Goiran, Hourston, Shine, Rasmussen, Thomson, & Sanders, 2020
