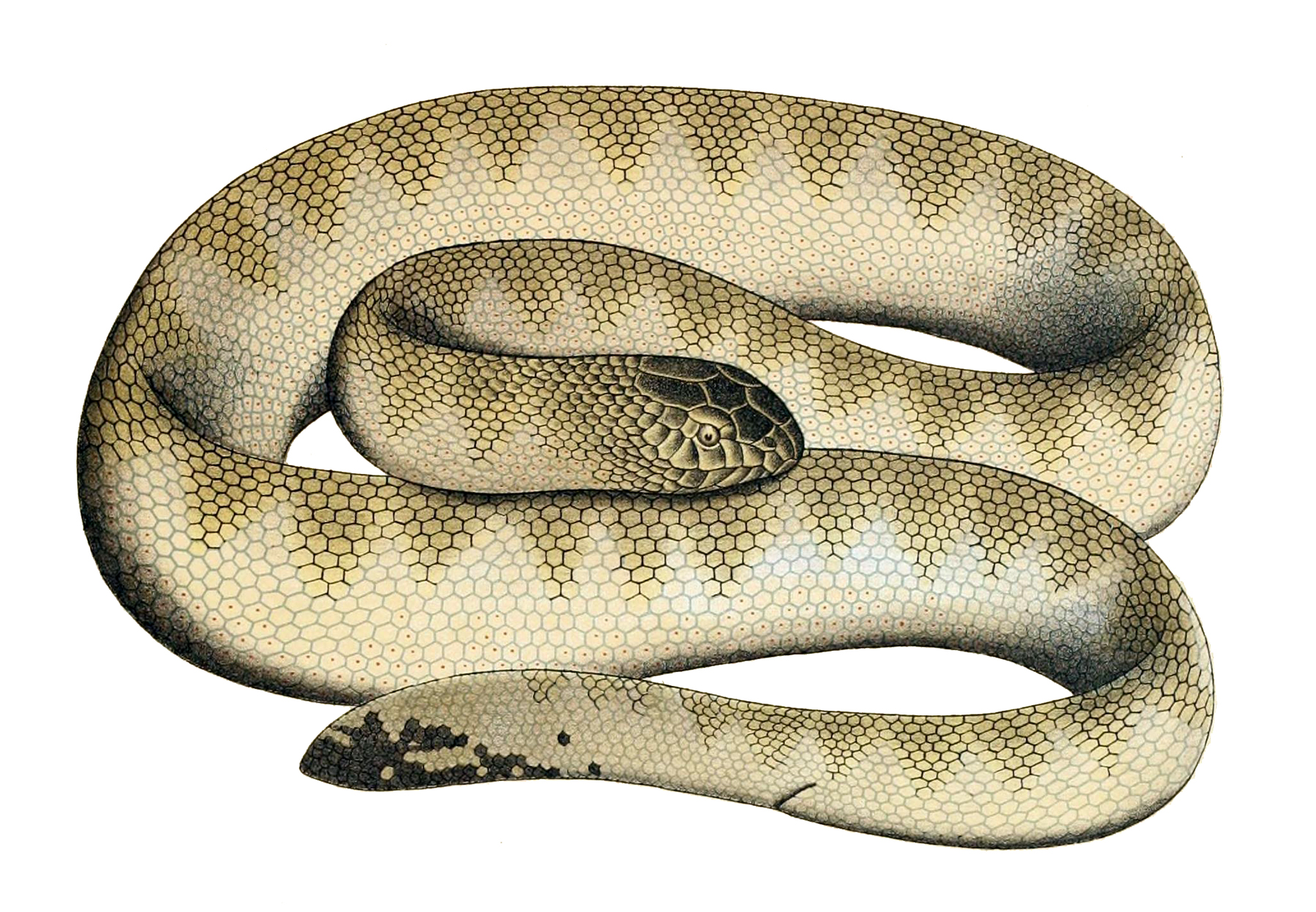

Scientific classification
- Kingdom: Animalia
- Phylum: Chordata
- Class: Reptilia
- Order: Squamata
- Suborder: Serpentes
- Family: Elapidae
- Genus: Hydrophis
- Species: H. hardwickii

Binomial name
- Hydrophis hardwickii (Gray, 1834)

Synonyms
- Lapemis hardwickii Gray, 1834; Hypsirhina hardwickii — Hardwicke & Gray, 1835; Hydrophis hardwickii — Günther, 1864; Enhydris hardwickii — Boulenger, 1896; Lapemis hardwickii — Stejneger, 1907; Hydrophis hardwickii — Sanders et al., 2012

= Spine-bellied sea snake =

Hardwicke's spine-bellied seasnake

Species of snake

The spine-bellied sea snake (Hydrophis hardwickii), also commonly known as Hardwicke's sea snake and Hardwicke's spine-bellied sea snake, is a species of venomous sea snake in the family Elapidae. The species is native to the Indian Ocean and the western Pacific Ocean.

== Etymology ==
The specific name, hardwickii, is in honor of English naturalist Thomas Hardwicke.

== Description ==
H. hardwickii has the following characteristics.

- Body short, stout, neck region not less than half as thick as midbody;
- Head large;
- Dorsal scales squarish or hexagonal, juxtaposed, outer 3–4 rows larger than others, scale rows: males 23–31 around neck, females 27–35, around midbody, males 25–27, females 33–41;
- Ventrals small, usually distinct anteriorly, not so posteriorly; in males 114–186, in females 141–230;
- Head shields entire, parietals occasionally divided;
- Nostrils superior, nasals in contact with one another;
- Prefrontal usually in contact with second upper labial;
- 7–8 upper labials, 3–4 bordering eye; 1 preocular and 1–2 postoculars; 2, rarely 3, anterior temporals;
- Greenish or yellow-olive above, whitish below; 35-50 olive to dark gray dorsal bars, tapering to a point laterally, occasionally encircling body; a narrow dark ventral stripe or broad irregular band occasionally present;
- Adults often lack any pattern and are uniform olive to dark gray;
- Head pale olive to black, yellow markings on snout present or not.
- Total length 860 mm (2 ft 10 in), tail length 85 mm (3.3 in).

== Geographic range ==
H. hardwickii is located in warm waters:

- Persian Gulf (United Arab Emirates, Iran)
- Indian Ocean (Bangladesh, Burma, Pakistan, Sri Lanka, India)
- South China Sea north to the coasts of Fujian and Shandong
- Strait of Taiwan
- Indoaustralian Archipelago
- North coast of Australia (Northern Territory, Queensland, Western Australia)
- Philippines, Cambodia.
- Pacific Ocean (Thailand, Indonesia, China, Japan, Papua New Guinea)
