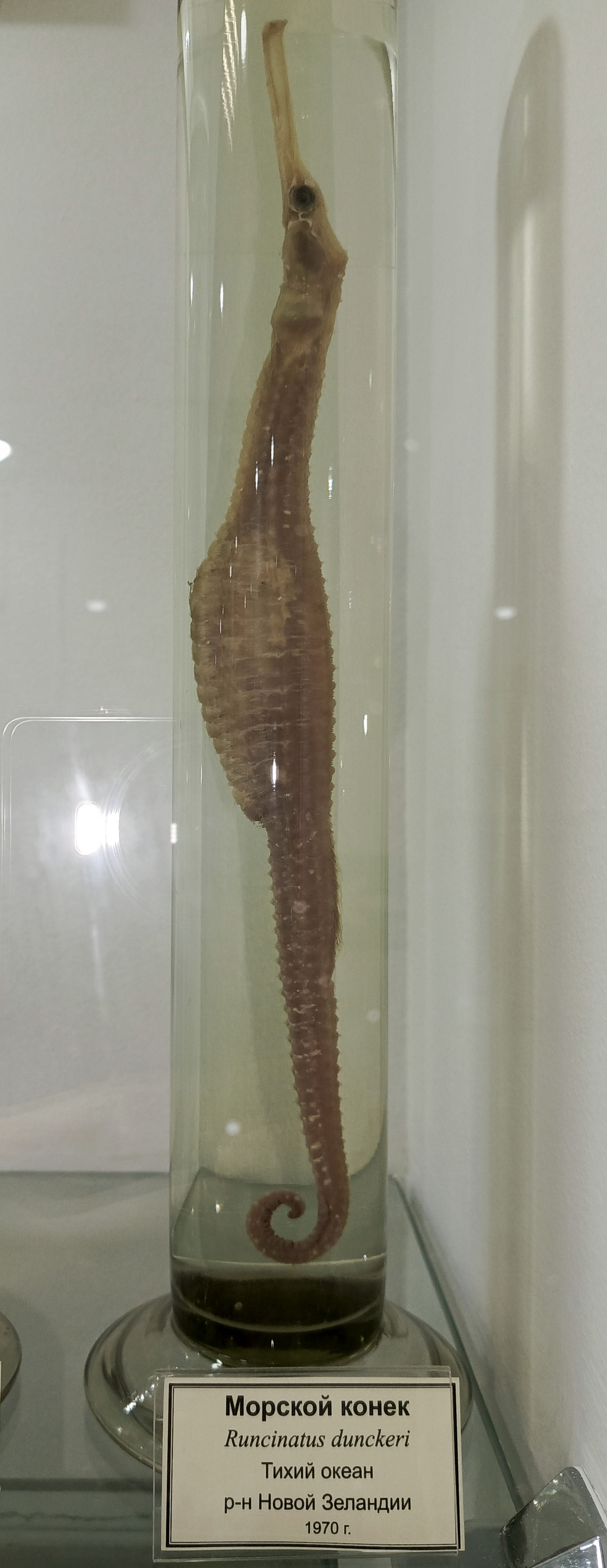

Conservation status
- Data Deficient (IUCN 3.1)

Scientific classification
- Kingdom: Animalia
- Phylum: Chordata
- Class: Actinopterygii
- Order: Syngnathiformes
- Family: Syngnathidae
- Genus: Solegnathus
- Species: S. dunckeri

Binomial name
- Solegnathus dunckeri Whitley, 1927

= Duncker's pipehorse =

Species of fish

Duncker's pipehorse (Solegnathus dunckeri), also known as the nose-ridge pipefish, red-and-gold pipehorse, red-hair pipefish or spiny sea dragon, is a species of fish in the family Syngnathidae. It is endemic to eastern Australia and Lord Howe Island. It is a pelagic species which is found in the waters of the continental shelf and the continental slope. Fishermen within its range report that it is caught where there are hard substrates such as hard sand, shale, sandstone or gravel and they are often caught alongside gorgonians, black corals, algae or sponges . It is an ovoviviparous species in which the male bears the fertilised eggs in a brood pouch located under his tail. It is a carnivorous species which feeds on small planktonic crustacean.

Its body has a variable colour, from creamy through to brown or even black with pinkish-orange and dark markings along the superior ridges on its back and 10-11 irregularly shaped, indistinct, pale pinkish or dark bands on back and sides and there are also dark markings along the underside of the tail; and ghosts of dark barring on the ventral surface of its trunk rings. In darker individuals the tip of the snout is often pale. The head and body is covered in spines except around the gills, the fin bases and the vent.

It was named in honour of Georg Duncker a German ichthyologist, who had a particular interest in pipefish.

It is classified as Data Deficient by the IUCN and is a listed marine species under the Australian Environment Protection and Biodiversity Conservation Act 1999.
