= Günther's pipehorse =

Conservation status
- Data Deficient (IUCN 3.1)

Scientific classification
- Kingdom: Animalia
- Phylum: Chordata
- Class: Actinopterygii
- Order: Syngnathiformes
- Family: Syngnathidae
- Genus: Solegnathus
- Species: S. lettiensis

Binomial name
- Solegnathus lettiensis Bleeker, 1860

Species of fish

Günther's pipehorse (Solegnathus lettiensis) is a species of fish in the family Syngnathidae. It is found in Australia and Indonesia.
