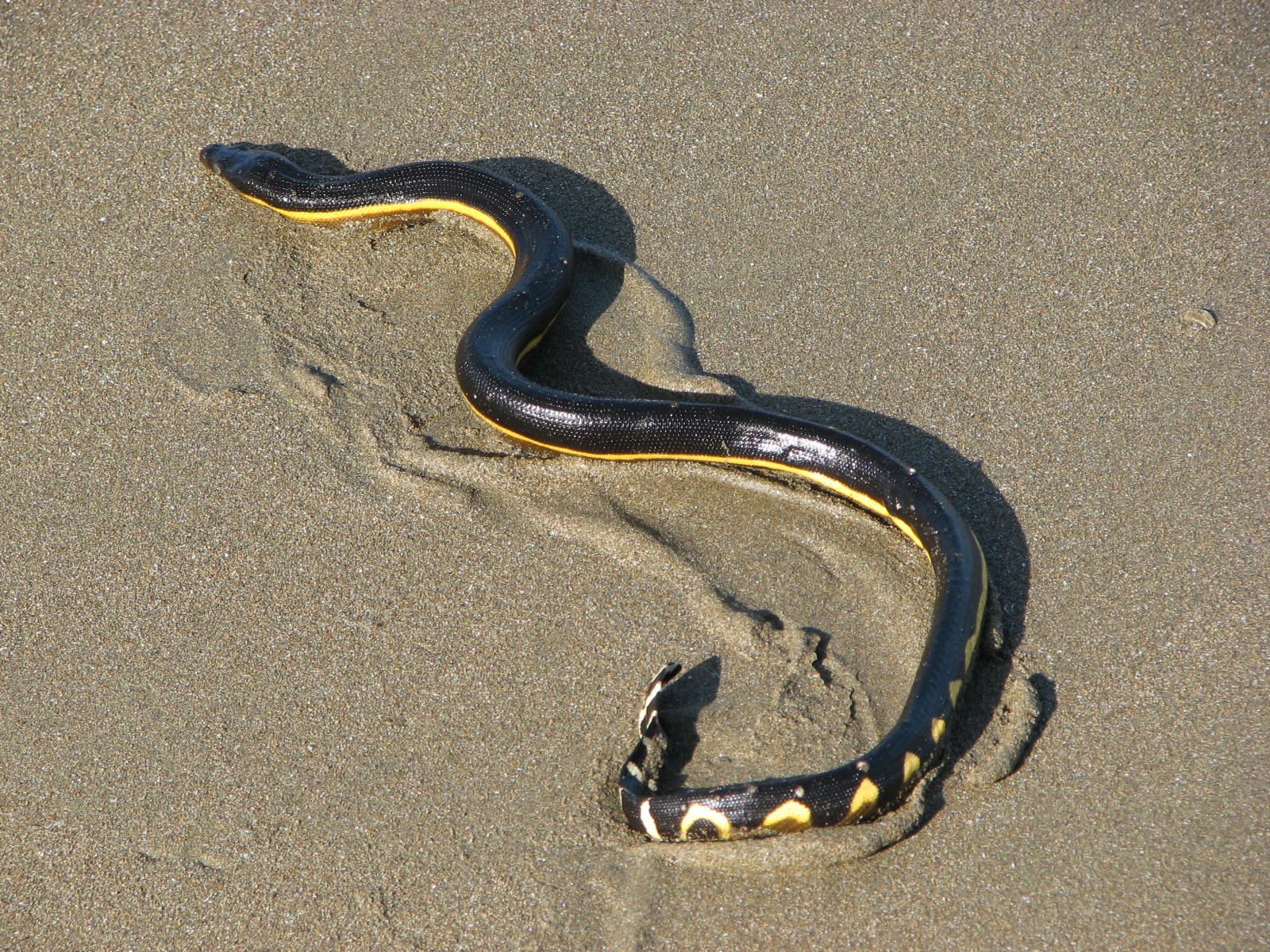
- Yellow-bellied sea snake

Conservation status
- Least Concern (IUCN 3.1)

Scientific classification
- Kingdom: Animalia
- Phylum: Chordata
- Class: Reptilia
- Order: Squamata
- Suborder: Serpentes
- Family: Elapidae
- Genus: Hydrophis
- Species: H. platurus

Binomial name
- Hydrophis platurus (Linnaeus, 1766)
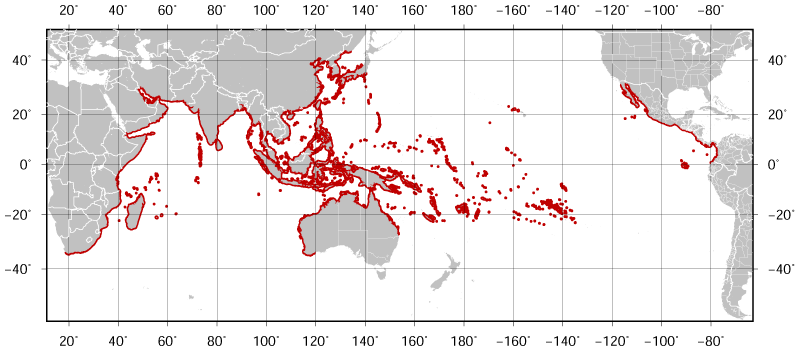
- Yellow-bellied sea snake range

Synonyms
- List: Anguis platura Linnaeus, 1766; Hydrus bicolor Schneider, 1799; Hydrophis platura – Latreille, 1801; Pelamis platuros – Daudin, 1803; Pelamis bicolor – Daudin, 1803; Hydrophis pelamis Schlegel, 1837; Pelamis ornata Gray, 1842; Pelamis platurus – Stoliczka, 1872; Hydrus platurus – Boulenger, 1890; Pelamydrus platurus – Schmidt & Davis, 1941; Pelamis platura – Böhme, 2003

= Yellow-bellied sea snake =

Species of snake

The yellow-bellied sea snake (Hydrophis platurus) is an extremely venomous species of snake from the subfamily Hydrophiinae (the sea snakes) found in tropical oceanic waters around the world except for the Atlantic Ocean. For many years, it was placed in the monotypic genus Pelamis, but recent molecular evidence indicates it lies within the genus Hydrophis.

== Taxonomy ==
In 1766, Linnaeus published the original description of the yellow-bellied sea snake, naming it Anguis platura (Anguis meaning snake). In 1803, François Marie Daudin created the new genus Pelamis and assigned this species to it, referring to it as Pelamis platuros. In 1842, Gray described what he thought was a new species and called it Pelamis ornata (subsequently P. ornata became a synonym of P. platura). The commonly used genus name Pelamis is derived from the Ancient Greek word for "tunny fish", which presumably refers to the habitat or what Daudin thought they ate. The specific name platurus is a combination of the Ancient Greek words platys "flat" and oura "tail", referring to the flattened tail. The word Pelamis is a feminine noun and means young or small tunny fish. In 1872, Stoliczka introduced the name Pelamis platurus (still the most used scientific name by scientists today), but used the incorrect ending -us instead of -a which a feminine noun requires. A few recent examples exist of scientists' beginning to use the grammatically correct name Pelamis platura, e.g., Bohme 2003 and the Reptile Database with its page headed Pelamis platura (Linnaeus, 1766), which includes an extensive synonymy of the different scientific names which have been used for the yellow-bellied sea snake. The same rules apply for the most recent taxonomic name of Hydrophis platurus.

To further complicate the nomenclature, the taxonomic status of sea snakes is still under review, with recent authors suggesting a dismantling of monotypic genera, such as Pelamis, in favour of a single genus, Hydrophis, in order to reduce paraphyly and better reflect phylogenetic relationships.

Other common names are yellowbelly sea snake or pelagic sea snake.

=== Evolution ===
Viviparous sea snakes are a monophyletic group (Hydrophiini) that diverged from the front-fanged Australasian venomous snakes (Elapidae) about 10 million years ago. The yellow-bellied sea snake is a part of the rapidly radiating Hydrophis group.

== Description ==
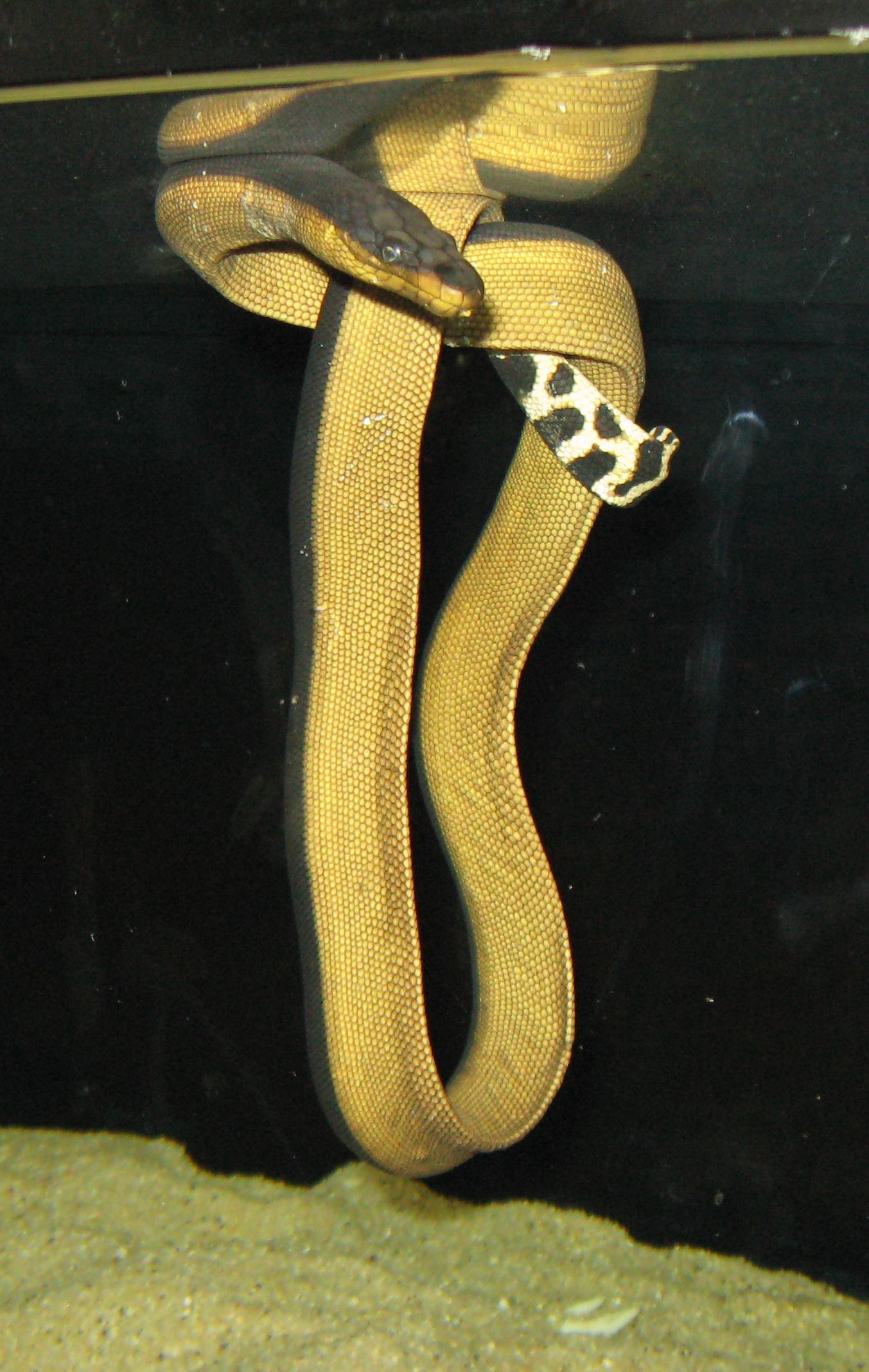
Hydrophis platurus, a front-fanged venomous snake, related to the brown snakes, cobras and taipans (Elapidae)

The yellow-bellied sea snake, as the name implies, has a distinctive bicolor pattern with a yellow underbelly and brown back, making it easily distinguishable from other sea snake species. Yellow-bellied sea snakes, like many other species of sea snake, are fully adapted to living their whole lives at sea: mating, eating and giving birth to live young (ovoviviparous). Adaptations to aquatic life include the reduced ventral scale size, laterally compressed body and paddle-tail for swimming, valved nostrils and palatine seal for excluding seawater, and cutaneous gas exchange for prolonging dive times. Yellow-bellied sea snakes have semi-permeable skin which extracts oxygen from the seawater through a process of cutaneous respiration while diving and swimming at the surface of the water. Sea snakes also have a special salt gland located in the lower jaw that was formerly believed to filter out salt from the surrounding seawater but has been found not to be used for that purpose, as sea snakes drink fresh water only.

See snake scales for terminology used here

=== Morphology ===
The body of this snake is compressed, with the posterior less than half the diameter of the neck; the body scales are juxtaposed, subquadrangular in shape, and in 23–47 rows around the thickest part of the body; ventral scales, 264–406 in number, are very small and, if distinct, divided by a latitudinal groove, but usually are indistinguishable from adjacent body scales. The head is narrow, with an elongated snout; head shields are entire, nostrils are superior, and nasal shields are in contact with one another; the prefrontal scale is in contact with second upper labial; one or two preoculars, two or three postoculars, and two or three small anterior temporals are present; seven or eight upper labials are found, with four or five below the eye, but separated from the border by a subocular. Colors of the snake are variable, but most often distinctly bicolored, black above, yellow or brown below, with the dorsal and ventral colors sharply demarcated from one another; ventrally, there may be a series of black spots or bars on the yellow or brown background, or the yellow may extend dorsally so there is only a narrow middorsal black stripe, or a series of black crossbars. Total length for males is up to 720 mm (28 in), for females up to 880 mm (35 in); tail length for males is up to 80 mm (3.1 in), females up to 90 mm (3.5 in).

== Distribution and habitat ==
The yellow-bellied sea snake is one of the most widely distributed snakes in the world. It is completely pelagic and is often observed on oceanic drift lines, using surface currents and storms to move around the ocean. Their distribution appears to be largely determined by favourable water temperatures, oceanic currents and recent formation of land bridges that have blocked farther dispersal.

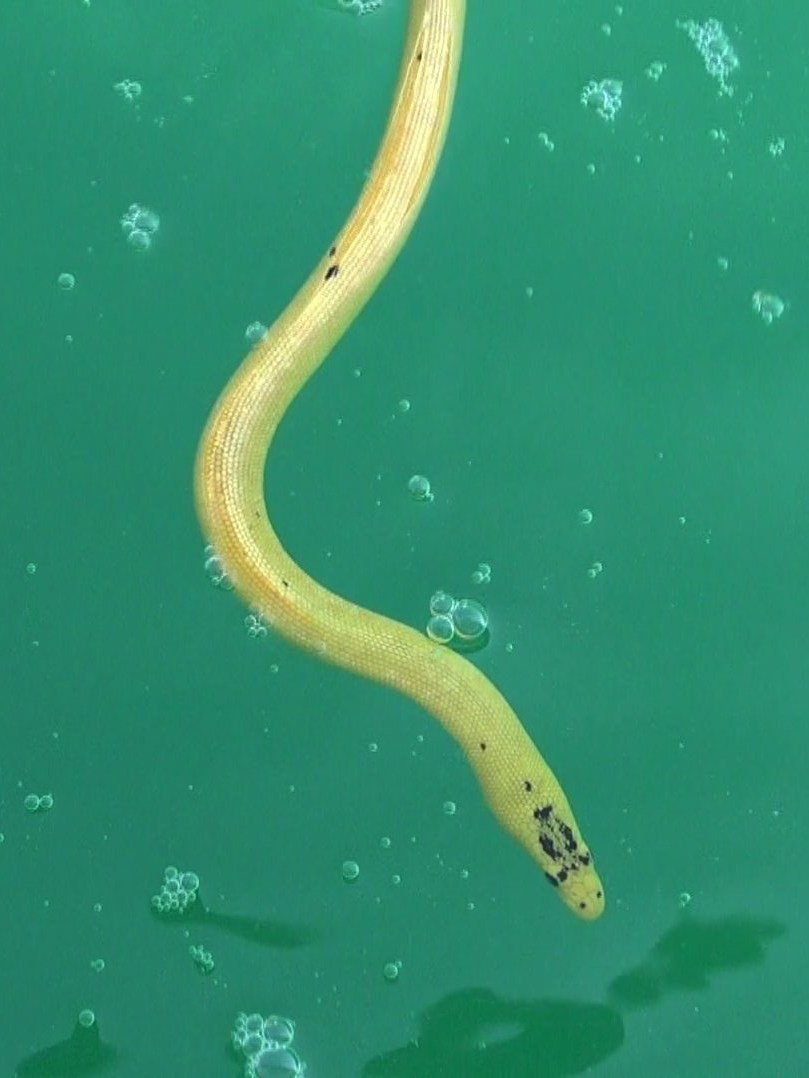
Yellow form from the Golfo Dulce on the Pacific coast of Costa Rica

The yellow-bellied sea snake has an extensive distribution covering the entire tropical Indo-Pacific, as well as extending to Costa Rica, southern California, and northern Peru. It is the only sea snake to have reached the Hawaiian Islands. The favoured habitat for hunting and reproduction includes free floating mats of sea kelp occurring in the Indian Ocean. The species is the most commonly beached sea snake on the coast of Southwest Australia, including records at beaches near metropolitan areas. It is also reported from Christmas Island and Cocos (Keeling) Islands (Australia).

The yellow-bellied sea snake requires a minimum of 16–18 °C (61–64 °F) to survive, long-term. However, the species has been reported in colder waters of the Pacific, such as the coasts of southern California, Mexico, Tasmania, and New Zealand, the latter being a country that would otherwise be free of snakes were it not for the infrequent strandings of yellow-bellied sea snakes and banded sea kraits. Nonetheless, these wayward individuals make the yellow-bellied sea snake the most commonly-seen snake (and sea snake) in New Zealand, to the degree that the species is considered native (indigenous) to New Zealand and worthy of protection under the Wildlife Act 1953. These colder water occurrences are believed to be linked to El Niño, among other severe weather events, possibly creating unusually strong, new ocean currents that transport the snakes far off-course. In October 2015, a beached yellow-bellied sea snake was reported and photographed in Ventura County, California, well outside its normal range, for the first time in 30 years. A few months later, in January 2016, a stranded individual was found in Coronado, California, washed-up on Coronado Beach's north end (better known as Dog Beach), just south of Naval Air Station North Island (NASNI). The specimen was subsequently transported to and examined at the Scripps Institute of Oceanography, La Jolla.

The yellow-bellied sea snake is the only sea snake to have been found in the Atlantic Ocean, although only in limited circumstances. The yellow-bellied sea snake's occurrence into the Atlantic is not considered a part of its native range, but rather a dispersal from its native Pacific range.

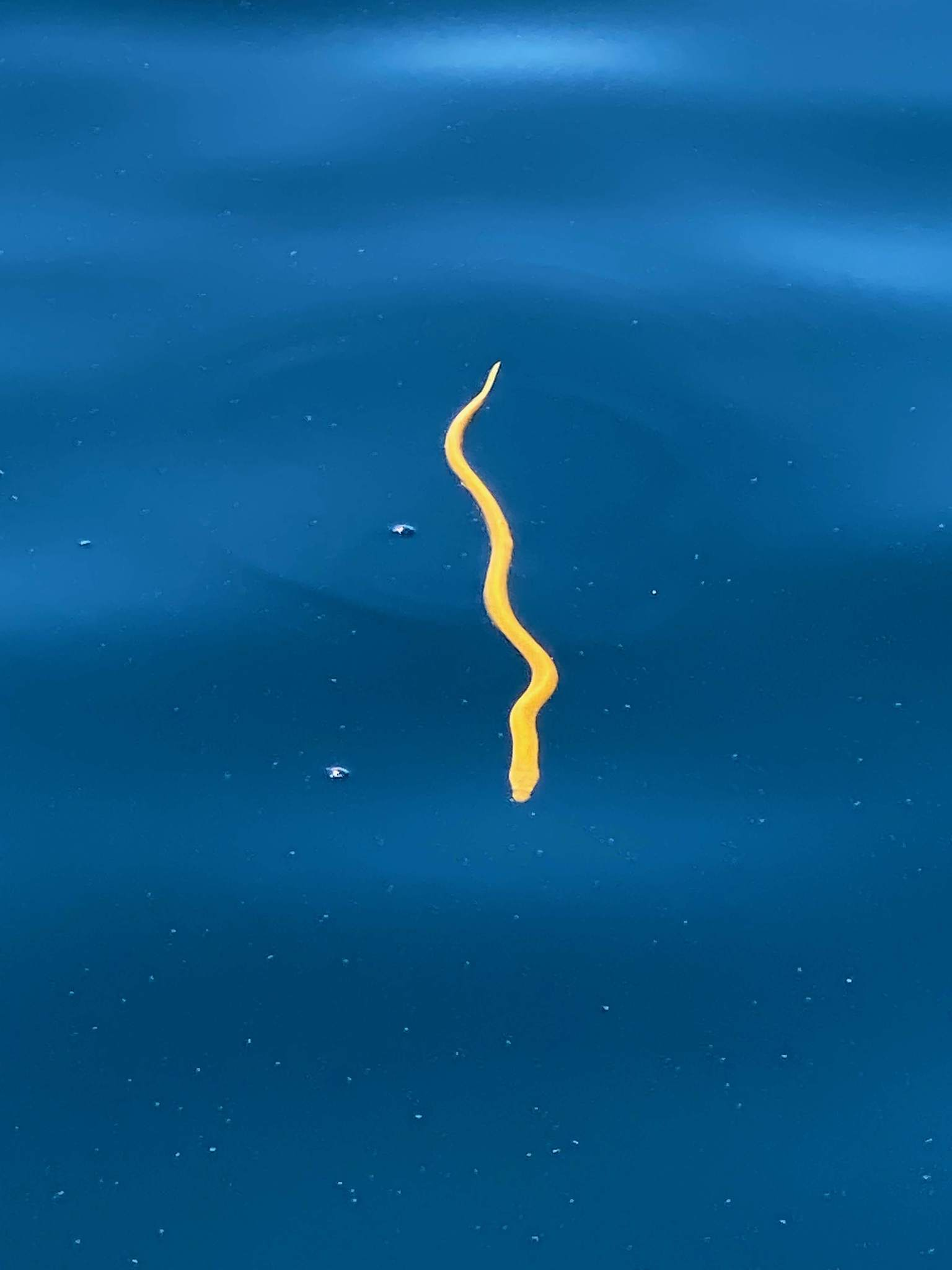
Hydrophis platurus xanthos

The yellow-bellied sea snake has been found in all the countries of Africa's eastern coast and all eastern islands, like Djibouti, Eritrea, Kenya, Madagascar, Mauritius, Mayotte, Mozambique, Réunion, Seychelles, Somalia, South Africa and Tanzania. On the African Atlantic coast they have been reported to occur in the Benguela Current, with specimens found along the coasts of South Africa and Namibia.

The yellow-bellied sea snake has also been found in the Colombian Caribbean four separate times, making it the only sea snake to be found in the Caribbean Sea. However these occurrences are believed to be the result of human activity, be it ship discharge, intentional release or via the Panama Canal, as it is not considered a part of their native range. This is due to the land bridge between North and South America, the Isthmus of Panama, which formed from about 10 million years ago to 3 million years ago (i.e., continental drift), acting as a dispersal barrier and preventing entry into the Caribbean Sea from the Pacific Ocean. The man-made Panama Canal has not made a crossing of the isthmus possible presumably because it is fresh water.

Due to the wide distribution of the species and relative lack of dispersal barriers, it has been assumed that individuals from different localities represent a single breeding population (i.e., high gene flow). However, a study that used haplotype networks in two populations from Costa Rica suggests that shallow genetic population structure exists, which reflects variation in colour patterns (brown and yellow in Golfo de Papagayo and completely yellow in Golfo Dulce).

== Behaviour ==
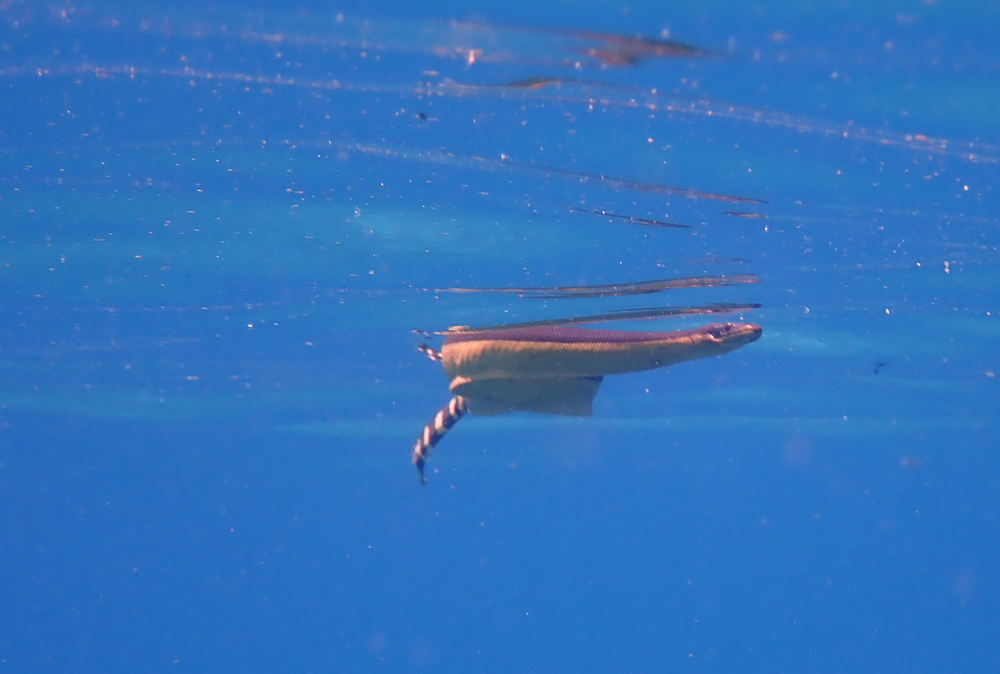
The yellow-bellied sea snake can live its entire adult life in the open ocean

Contrary to past beliefs, sea snakes require fresh or brackish water to survive; the yellow-bellied sea snake likely drinks mainly from freshwater lenses that form on the surface of the sea after heavy precipitation. This species has been reported to survive severe dehydration of up to 7 months during seasonal drought.

Yellow-bellied sea snakes breed in warm waters; they are ovoviviparous with a gestation period around 6 months. According to Ditmars, females bear live young in tidal pools. They move poorly on land due to their smaller belly scales that form a ventral keel. They are sometimes observed in large aggregations of thousands on the surface of the water in oceanic drift lines, which has been proposed as a strategy to catch prey. They hunt by floating on the surface of the water to attract pelagic fish that are seeking shelter; prey are captured via a backwards swimming motion and rapid lunge of the jaws. The ability to swim backwards is an unusual and distinguishing characteristic of this species. Heatwole proposed that these snakes find their prey by sensing the vibration generated by fish movement. These snakes are not considered aggressive but will defend themselves if threatened.

== Venom ==
The venom of this species is highly potent, like that of other sea snakes. Bites are rare and the most common victims are fishermen who try to get them out of fishing nets. The subcutaneous LD_{50} of the venom is 0.067 mg/kg and the venom yield per bite is 1.0–4.0 mg. Yellow-bellied sea snake venom contains several different neurotoxins and two other isotoxins. Juvenile and adult specimens have the same toxin compounds in their venom; however, juvenile venom is on average less concentrated.

=== Antivenom ===
Sea snake venom can cause damage to skeletal muscle with consequent myoglobinuria, neuromuscular paralysis or direct renal damage. The venoms of significant species of sea snake are neutralised with Commonwealth Serum Laboratories Ltd (of Melbourne, Australia) sea snake (Enhydrina schistosa) antivenom. If that preparation is not available, tiger snake or polyvalent antivenom should be used. No deaths have been recorded from bites in Australian waters. The E. schistosa antivenom was tested specifically on Pelamus platurus, and it effectively neutralised the venom.

== Other sources ==
- Klein, Adam G. (2010). Yellow-bellied Sea Snakes. Edina, MN: Abdo Publishing. ISBN 978-1-350-00694-2. OCLC 58546618.
- Ditmars, Raymond L. (1936). The Reptiles of North America. New York: Doubleday, Doran & Co. p. 476.
- Hecht, M. K.; Kropach, C.; Hecht, B. M. (1974). "Distribution of the yellow-bellied sea snake Pelamis platurus, and its significance in relation to the fossil record". Herpetologica. 30: 387–395.
- Kropach, C. 1975 The yellow-bellied sea snake, Pelamis, in the eastern Pacific. pp. 185–213 in: Dunson, W., ed., The Biology of Sea Snakes. Univ. Park Press, Baltimore, xi + 530 pp.
- Smith, M.A. 1943. The Fauna of British India, Ceylon and Burma, including the Whole of the Indo-Chinese Sub-region. Reptiles and Amphibians. Vol. III. – Serpentes. Taylor & Francis. London. 583 pp.
