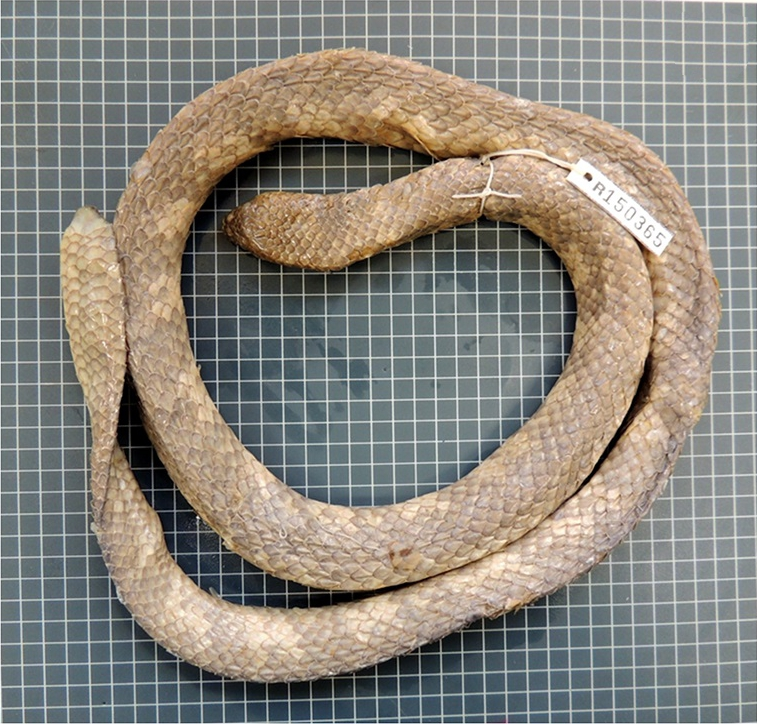
- Museum specimen

Conservation status
- Data Deficient (IUCN 3.1)

Scientific classification
- Kingdom: Animalia
- Phylum: Chordata
- Class: Reptilia
- Order: Squamata
- Suborder: Serpentes
- Family: Elapidae
- Genus: Aipysurus
- Species: A. foliosquama

Binomial name
- Aipysurus foliosquama Smith, 1926

= Aipysurus foliosquama =

Leaf-scaled sea snake

Species of snake

Aipysurus foliosquama, also known as the leaf-scaled sea snake, is a species of venomous sea snake in the family Elapidae. It was formerly endemic to the Ashmore and Cartier Islands of Australia, having thought to have become extinct there. In 2015, the snake was discovered in seagrass beds of Shark Bay off Western Australia.

== Taxonomy ==
The species was first described in 1926. The combination Smithohydrophis foliosquama (Kharin 1981) is recognised as a synonym.

== Description ==
The recorded length is around 800 millimetres and coloration is purple brown. A poorly known species, the diet is known to consist of wrasse and gudgeon fish that are pursued through coral outcrops and crevices.

Like other sea snakes, it does not have gills and must periodically rise to the surface to breathe air using its lungs.

== Distribution and habitat ==
The distribution range of the species has contracted since its first identification, and is currently known from a declining population inhabiting Shark Bay on the western coast of Australia. The leaf-scaled sea snake prefers waters up to 10 metres in depth.

In December 2015 a population of the snakes was found living in seagrass beds of Shark Bay off Western Australia. Previously, its only known habitats were some 1,700 km away in the Ashmore and Hibernia Reefs in the Timor Sea, from where it had since disappeared.

== Conservation status ==
The range of Aipysurus foliosquama has significantly decreased and population is significantly declining, the IUCN lists their status as data deficient. It is listed as one of The World's 100 Most Threatened Species.
