= Bryan Grieg Fry =

Brian Grieg Fry
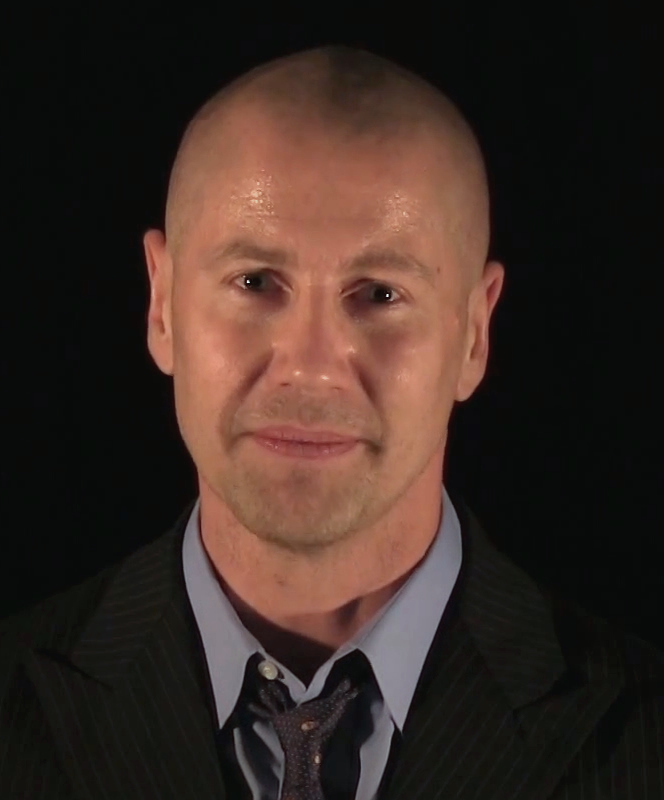
- Fry in 2014
- Born: 1970 (age 55–56); United States
- Occupation: Researcher
- Known for: Venom research
- Scientific career
- Fields: Biochemistry
- Workplaces: University of Queensland

Brian Grieg Fry (born 1970) is an American researcher in biochemistry affiliated with the University of Queensland in Australia, where he is an associate professor and heads the university's research division specializing in venom. Fry has appeared in a number of programs on Discovery Channel's Science Channel, and has been interviewed by popular science magazines including National Geographic, the BBC's Focus Magazine and others.
