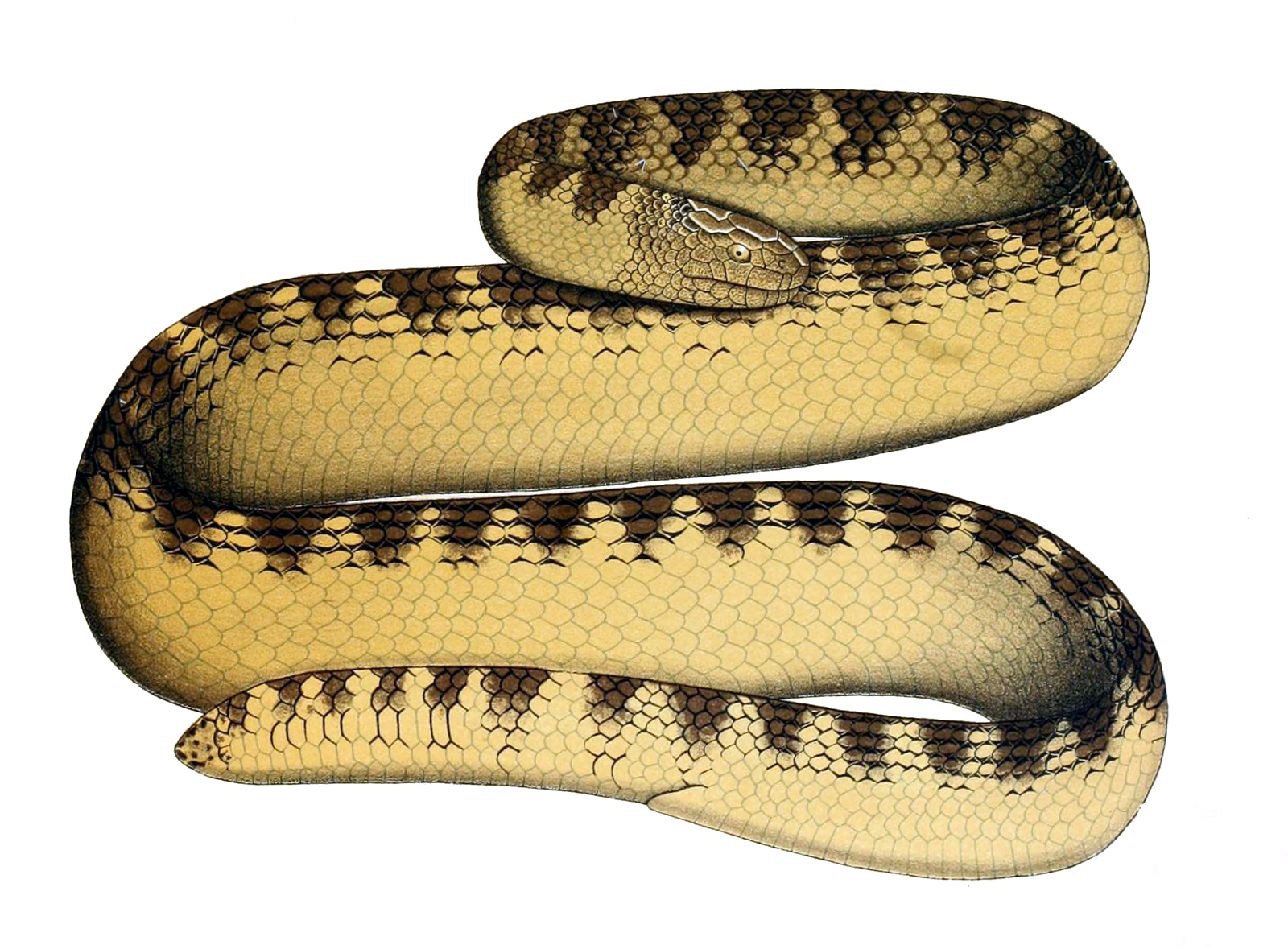

Conservation status
- Least Concern (IUCN 3.1)

Scientific classification
- Kingdom: Animalia
- Phylum: Chordata
- Class: Reptilia
- Order: Squamata
- Suborder: Serpentes
- Family: Elapidae
- Genus: Aipysurus
- Species: A. eydouxii

Binomial name
- Aipysurus eydouxii (Gray, 1849)

Synonyms
- Tomogaster eydouxii Gray, 1849; Aipysurus margaritiphorus Bleeker, 1858; Aipysurus eydouxii — Boulenger, 1896; Aipysurus eydouxi [sic] — Smedley, 1931; Aepyurus [sic] eydouxi — M.A. Smith, 1943; Aipysurus eydouxii — Cogger, 2000

= Aipysurus eydouxii =

Species of snake

Aipysurus eydouxii, commonly known as the beaded sea snake, the marbled seasnake, and the spine-tailed seasnake, is a species of venomous snake in the family Elapidae. A. eydouxii is unusual amongst sea snakes in that it feeds almost exclusively on fish eggs. As part of this unusual diet, this species has lost its fangs, and the venom glands are almost entirely atrophied.

== Etymology ==
The specific name, eydouxii, commemorates French naturalist Joseph Fortuné Théodore Eydoux.

== Geographic range ==
A. eydouxii is found in Western Australia, Northern Territory, Queensland, the South China Sea, the Gulf of Thailand, Indonesia, Peninsular Malaysia, Vietnam, and New Guinea.

== Description ==
Adults of A. eydouxii may attain a snout to vent length (SVL) of 1 m (3.3 ft). The head shields are regular and symmetrical. The smooth dorsal scales are arranged in 17 rows at midbody. The ventrals, which are distinct throughout the length of the body, range from 141 to 149; the subcaudals, from 27 to 30.

== Habitat ==
A. eydouxii inhabits shallow bays and estuaries, to a depth of 50 m (160 ft).

== Diet ==
A. eydouxii predominately eats the eggs of benthic fishes. Relative to other sea snakes, it has several derived characteristics related to its special diet. These include strong throat musculature, consolidation of lip scales, reduction and loss of teeth, greatly reduced body size, and (due to a dinucleotide deletion in the 3FTx gene) much reduced toxicity of the venom.

Only one other species of sea snake, Emydocephalus annulatus, shares the eggs-only diet of A. eydouxii.

== Reproduction ==
A. eydouxii is ovoviviparous.
