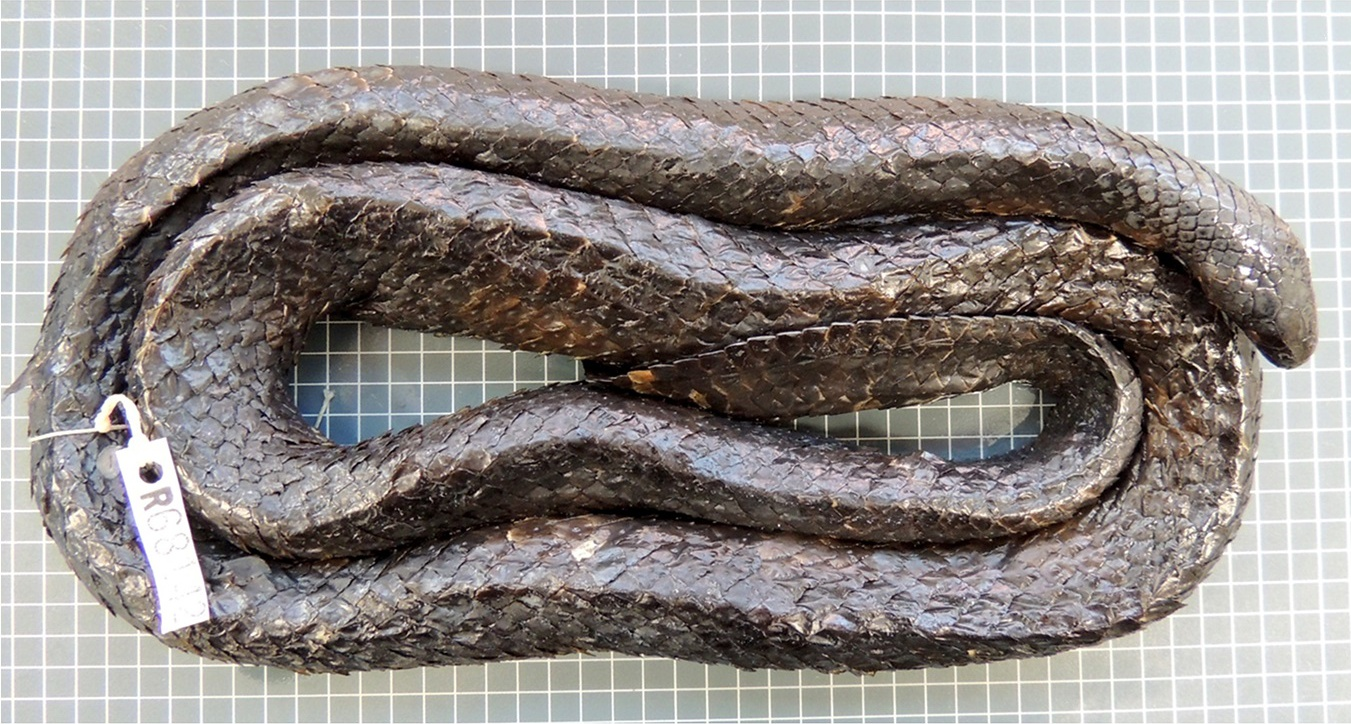
- Museum specimen

Conservation status
- Data Deficient (IUCN 3.1)

Scientific classification
- Kingdom: Animalia
- Phylum: Chordata
- Class: Reptilia
- Order: Squamata
- Suborder: Serpentes
- Family: Elapidae
- Genus: Aipysurus
- Species: A. apraefrontalis

Binomial name
- Aipysurus apraefrontalis Smith, 1926

= Aipysurus apraefrontalis =

Species of snake

Aipysurus apraefrontalis, commonly known as the short-nosed sea snake or Sahul reef snake, is a species of venomous sea snake in the family Elapidae, which occurs on reefs off the northern coast of Western Australia. English herpetologist Malcolm Arthur Smith described the species in 1926 from a specimen collected on the Ashmore Reef.

== Taxonomy ==
There are thought to be two distinct populations of the species: the oceanic Ashmore Reef population, which is potentially extirpated since 1998 although a possible observation was made in 2021, and the "coastal" population from the coast of Western Australia including Ningaloo Reef, documented from 2015 onwards and potentially the only extant population of the species, which has distinct morphological and ecological differences from the oceanic population. Due to these differences, they could potentially be distinct species from one another, although genetic testing is required. If they are distinct species, A. apraefrontalis sensu stricto may once again qualify as possibly extinct, unless the 2021 sighting is of this species.

== Description and behaviour ==
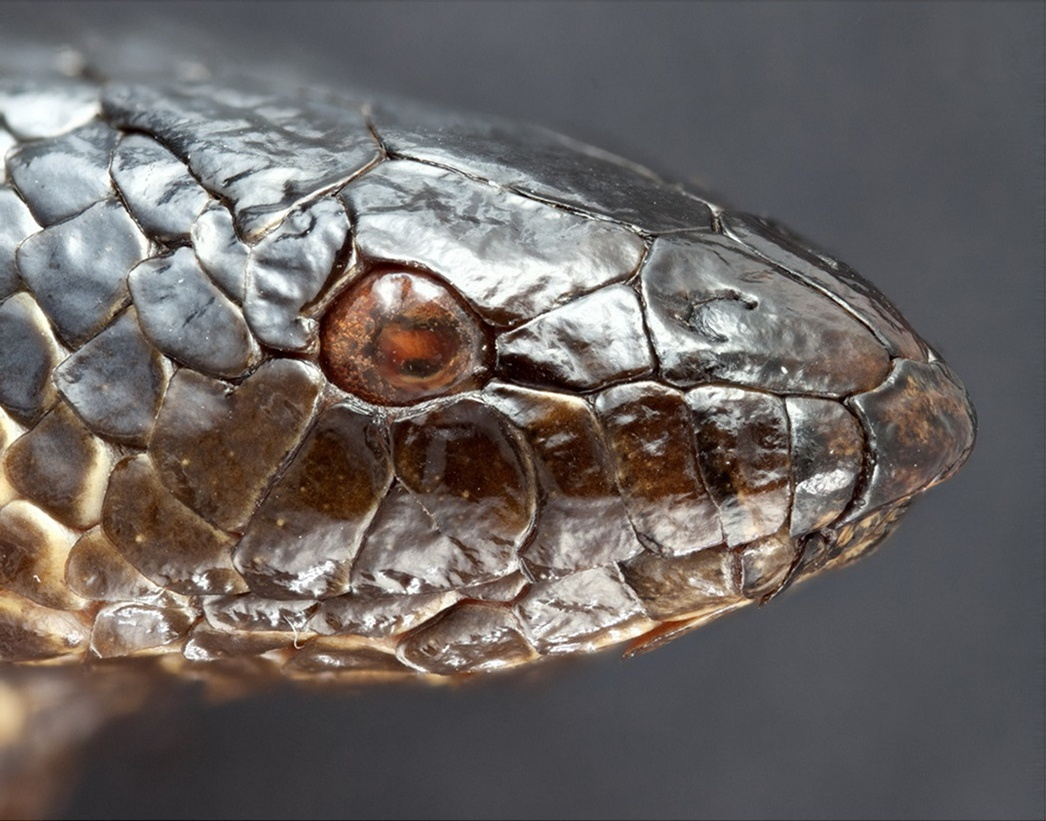
The head is distinctively small and pointed

The mainly brown, slender snakes grow up to 60 cm (24 in) long. Their head is distinctively small and pointed, and there are darker purplish-brown bands over its body. They are long-lived and slow-growing, and their age of sexual maturity is not known. They prefer water more than 10 metres (33 feet) deep, but rest during the day under coral overhangs in water less than 2 metres (6.6 feet) deep. They forage on reef flats and have strong venom which they use on their prey. It is thought that the short-nosed sea snakes, or at least the coastal variants, mostly prey upon eels, and besides on gobies. Coastal variants have smaller heads suited for hunting eels in shallow sandy and seagrass habitats.

They breathe at the surface, and close the nostril valves during dives which may last as much as two hours. They have only one lung, which is cylindrical and almost as long as the body. Oxygen is however also absorbed through their skin, which is shed more regularly than land snakes, to rid them from attached marine organisms. They are ovoviviparous like all in their family, and the whole reproductive cycle takes place at sea. Male sea snakes have two penises (or hemipenes), of which only one is employed in the prolonged mating act. A salt excreting gland is located under the tongue.

== Range and status ==
In 2010, A. apraefrontalis was assessed as Critically Endangered on the IUCN Red List, but was reassessed as Data Deficient in 2018. The snake is found in the Ashmore and Cartier Islands and the Ningaloo Reef off the coast of Northwestern Australia. It was thought to only breed on Ashmore Reef, where it had not been recorded for fifteen years and hence was feared extinct. A 2015 study found that samples from the short-nosed sea snake, found in Exmouth Gulf, offshore from Roebourne and Broome, and from the Arafura Sea indicated that these represented distinct breeding populations, and not vagrants from elsewhere. A courting pair was observed at the Ningaloo Reef in December 2015, suggesting that a breeding population may be extant there. However, recent studies indicate that these "coastal" short-nosed sea snakes may potentially represent a new, undescribed species from the "true" short-nosed sea snakes of Ashmore Reef, meaning that the species may indeed be endemic to the Ashmore and Cartier Islands and potentially extinct.

In 2021, a survey of Ashmore Reef by the Schmidt Ocean Institute using ROVs with cameras discovered a short-nosed sea snake in the reef's mesophotic zone, marking the first sighting of the species at the reef since 1998. It is possible that the mesophotic zone could serve as a refugium for sea snakes lost from shallower waters of the reef. However, it is as of yet unknown if the observed individual was a "true" short-nosed sea snake or a member of the coastal population that recently migrated out to the reef. There are plans to catch a member of the new Ashmore population and genetically compare it with a member of the coastal population in order to elucidate the identity of the current snakes on Ashmore Reef.

== Threats ==
Warmer sea temperatures and commercial prawn trawling activities have been highlighted as factors which may negatively impact their numbers. A fair proportion that are caught in trawler nets die from injuries or drowning. Oil spills, water contamination, dredging activities and disturbance or harm caused by increased boat traffic may be additional factors. The reason for their decline is however complex, and likely related to a decline in the whole ecosystem. Their reproduction is slow due to their small broods and high rate of juvenile mortality. Females are also unlikely to breed every year.
