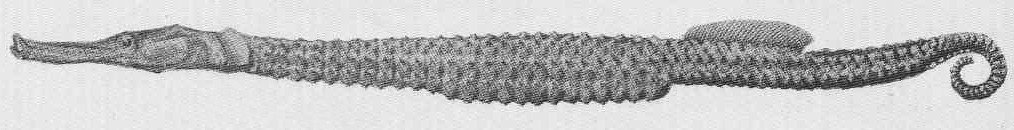

Conservation status
- Least Concern (IUCN 3.1)

Scientific classification
- Kingdom: Animalia
- Phylum: Chordata
- Class: Actinopterygii
- Order: Syngnathiformes
- Family: Syngnathidae
- Genus: Solegnathus
- Species: S. robustus

Binomial name
- Solegnathus robustus McCulloch, 1911

= Robust pipehorse =

Species of fish

The robust pipehorse (Solegnathus robustus) is a species of fish in the family Syngnathidae. It is endemic to southern Australia.
