= Hardwicke's pipefish =

Conservation status
- Data Deficient (IUCN 3.1)

Scientific classification
- Kingdom: Animalia
- Phylum: Chordata
- Class: Actinopterygii
- Order: Syngnathiformes
- Family: Syngnathidae
- Genus: Solegnathus
- Species: S. hardwickii

Binomial name
- Solegnathus hardwickii (J. E. Gray, 1830)

Synonyms
- Syngnathus hardwickii Gray, 1830; Solegnathus polyprion Bleeker, 1853

Species of fish

Hardwicke's pipefish or pallid seahorse (Solegnathus hardwickii) is a species of fish in the family Syngnathidae. It is found in Australia, China, Indonesia, Japan, Malaysia, Mauritius, the Philippines, Thailand, and Vietnam. Its natural habitats are open seas, shallow seas, subtidal aquatic beds, and coral reefs. It is threatened by habitat loss.
