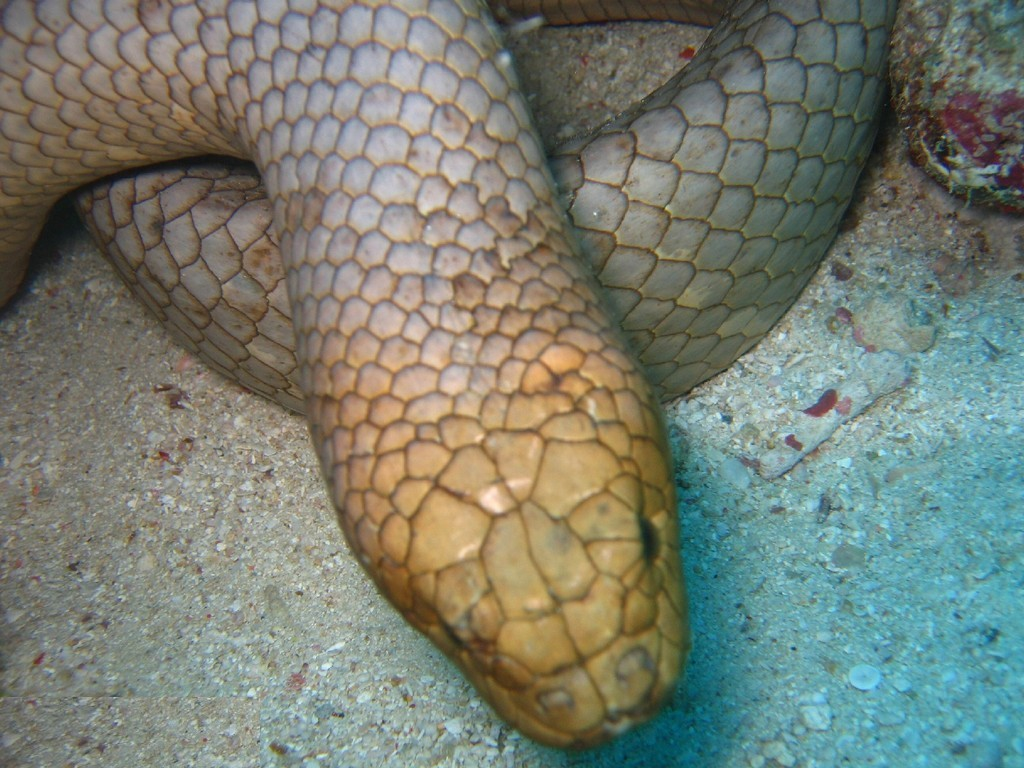

Conservation status
- Least Concern (IUCN 3.1)

Scientific classification
- Kingdom: Animalia
- Phylum: Chordata
- Class: Reptilia
- Order: Squamata
- Suborder: Serpentes
- Family: Elapidae
- Genus: Aipysurus
- Species: A. laevis

Binomial name
- Aipysurus laevis Lacépède, 1804

= Aipysurus laevis =

Species of snake

Aipysurus laevis is a species of venomous sea snake found in the Indo-Pacific. Its common names include golden sea snake, olive sea snake, and olive-brown sea snake.

== Taxonomy ==
A species was first described by Bernard Germain de Lacépède in 1804, assigning it to a new genus Aipysurus. A name published by John Edward Gray, Aipysurus jukesii, is regarded as a synonym for this species.

Currently, two subspecies are recognized, including the nominotypical subspecies described below. The subspecies A. l. pooleorum has been elevated to full species status as A. pooleorum.

Subspecies	Authority	Common name
A. l. laevis	Lacépède, 1804	olive sea snake
A. l. pooleorum	L.A. Smith, 1974	Shark Bay sea snake

=== Etymology ===
Aipysurus derives from the Greek aipys "high and steep" and oura "tail"; the term loosely meaning "high tail" was coined to denote "the laterally compressed tail that is higher than the depth of the body". Laevis, a variant form of Latin levis, means "smooth". The specific name, pooleorum (masculine, genitive plural), is in honor of Australian fishermen "W. and W. Poole" who collected the holotype.

== Distribution and habitat ==
It is a common, widespread species that lives on coral reefs, including the Great Barrier Reef. It can be found in the tropical eastern Indian Ocean and the western Pacific Ocean, from Indonesia to New Caledonia.

The snake hides in small coves or protective coral areas if not hunting or surfacing to breathe.

== Description ==
The olive sea snake swims using a paddle-like tail. It has brownish and purple scales along the top of its body whilst its underside is a white color. It can grow up to a meter in length, and in some cases up to two meters.

== Behavior ==
The snake feeds on crustaceans (such as crabs and prawns), fish, and fish eggs. It uses venom to incapacitate its prey. This venom is rich in enzymes that facilitate the internal breakdown of the prey, simplifying the digestion process. The venom also affects both the muscles and nerves of the prey. The snake usually hunts in coral reef areas, searching for food by poking its head into crevices. The creature usually stays away from open water as a hunting ground.

Aipysurus laevis has been found to have photoreceptors in the skin of its tail, allowing it to detect light and presumably ensuring it is completely hidden, including its tail, inside coral holes during the day. While other species have not been tested, A. laevis possibly is not unique among sea snakes in this respect. Dermal light sensitivity is found in all the major animal phyla.

While it can be aggressive towards prey, attacks on divers or larger animals are rare, though if provoked it will engage the attacker. The snake's main predators are sharks and ospreys.

== Reproduction ==
Males can reach sexual maturity in their third year, while females do not until their fourth or fifth year. Courtship usually involves a group of males vying for one female, which occurs in open water. At times, divers are approached by male sea snakes, possibly due to male sea snakes mistaking divers for female sea snakes.

Fertilization is internal and gestation lasts for about nine months. Females can give birth up to five young at a time. In rare cases, there can be ten or eleven young at once. Life expectancy of the snake is about fifteen years, sometimes a bit longer.

== Conservation ==
While there are not many natural threats to the Aipysurus laevis, man-made dangers do exist for it. Prawn trawls are one of the greatest threats for the creature, up to 50% of olive sea snakes caught in trawls are killed, while the ones that survive usually suffer injuries. Death from prawn trawls often comes either from drowning or being crushed. Fitting of turtle exclusion devices, which decrease the total weight of the trawl catch, increase survival of snakes, while bycatch reduction devices can exclude many sea snakes.

== See also ==
- Snakebite
