= Kate Sanders =

Australian herpetologist

Kate Laura Sanders is a researcher at the University of Adelaide, specialising in the study of sea snakes. She received a PhD from Bangor University in 2003 and was an Australian Research Council Future Fellow (2013-2017). Sanders has undertaken field work that has resulted in the identification of new species, including the sea snake Aipysurus mosaicus.

Sanders has examined and published on the aquatic snakes of seas off the Western Australian and Indonesian coasts. Recent work has included new discoveries on the evolution of sea snake vision, cutaneous respiration in the forehead of some sea snakes, the presence of light sensors in the tails of some sea snakes and a description of the squamate clitoris (a hitherto under explored subject).

Sanders's work includes an appointment as co-chair of the IUCN/SSC Sea Snake Specialist Group.
