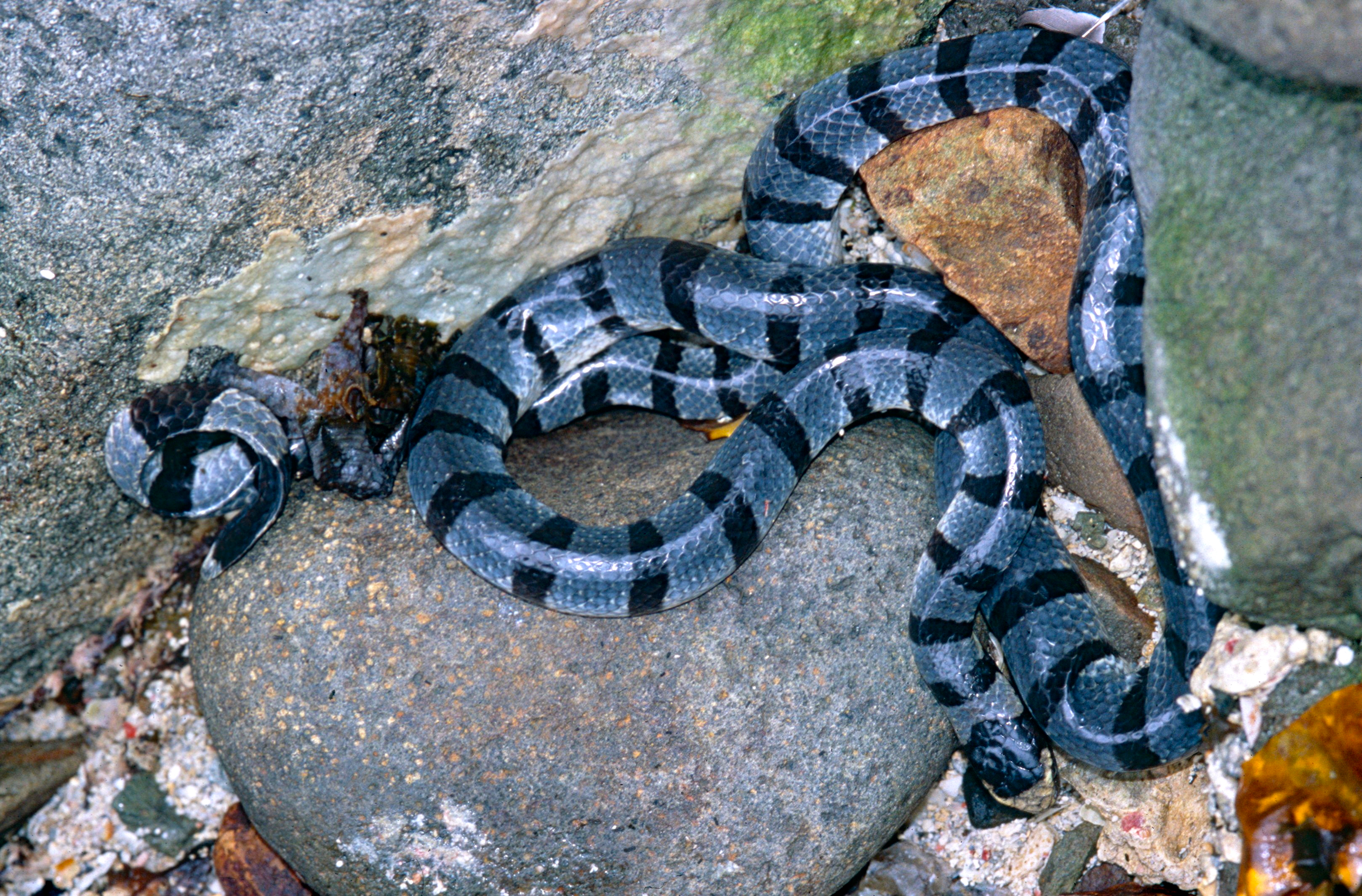
- Yellow-lipped sea krait in Malaysia

Conservation status
- Least Concern (IUCN 3.1)

Scientific classification
- Kingdom: Animalia
- Phylum: Chordata
- Class: Reptilia
- Order: Squamata
- Suborder: Serpentes
- Family: Elapidae
- Genus: Laticauda
- Species: L. colubrina

Binomial name
- Laticauda colubrina (Schneider, 1799)

Synonyms
- Hydrus colubrinus Schneider, 1799; Platurus colubrinus — Wagler, 1830; Hydrophis colubrinus — Schlegel, 1837; Laticauda colubrina — Stejneger, 1907

= Yellow-lipped sea krait =

Species of reptile

The yellow-lipped sea krait (Laticauda colubrina), also known as the banded sea krait or colubrine sea krait, is a species of highly venomous snake found in tropical Indo-Pacific oceanic waters. The snake has distinctive black stripes and a yellow snout, with a paddle-like tail for use in swimming.

It spends much of its time under water to hunt, but returns to land to digest, rest, and reproduce. It has very potent neurotoxic venom, which it uses to prey on eels and small fish. Because of its affinity to land, the yellow-lipped sea krait often encounters humans, but the snake is not aggressive and only attacks when feeling threatened.

== Description ==
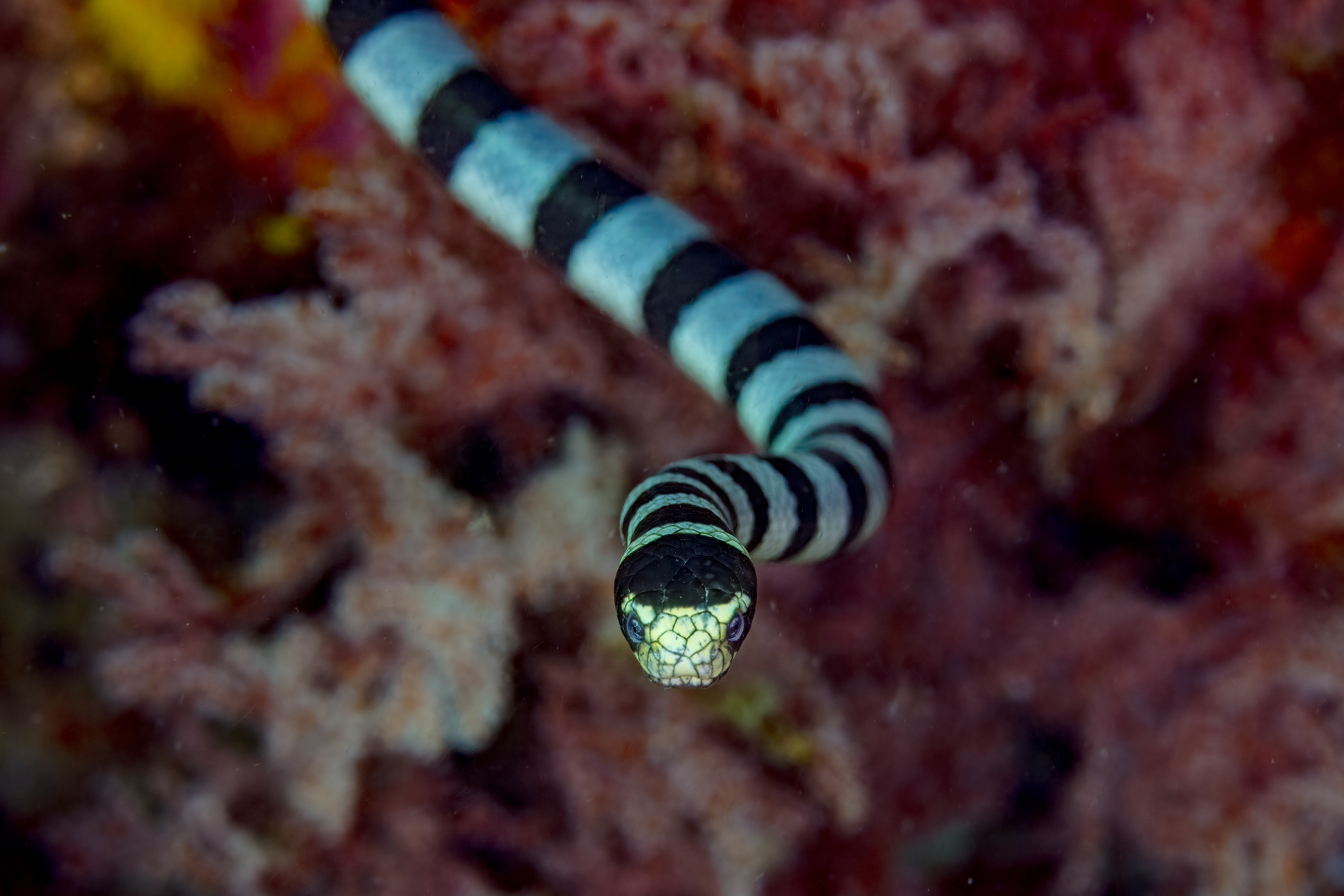
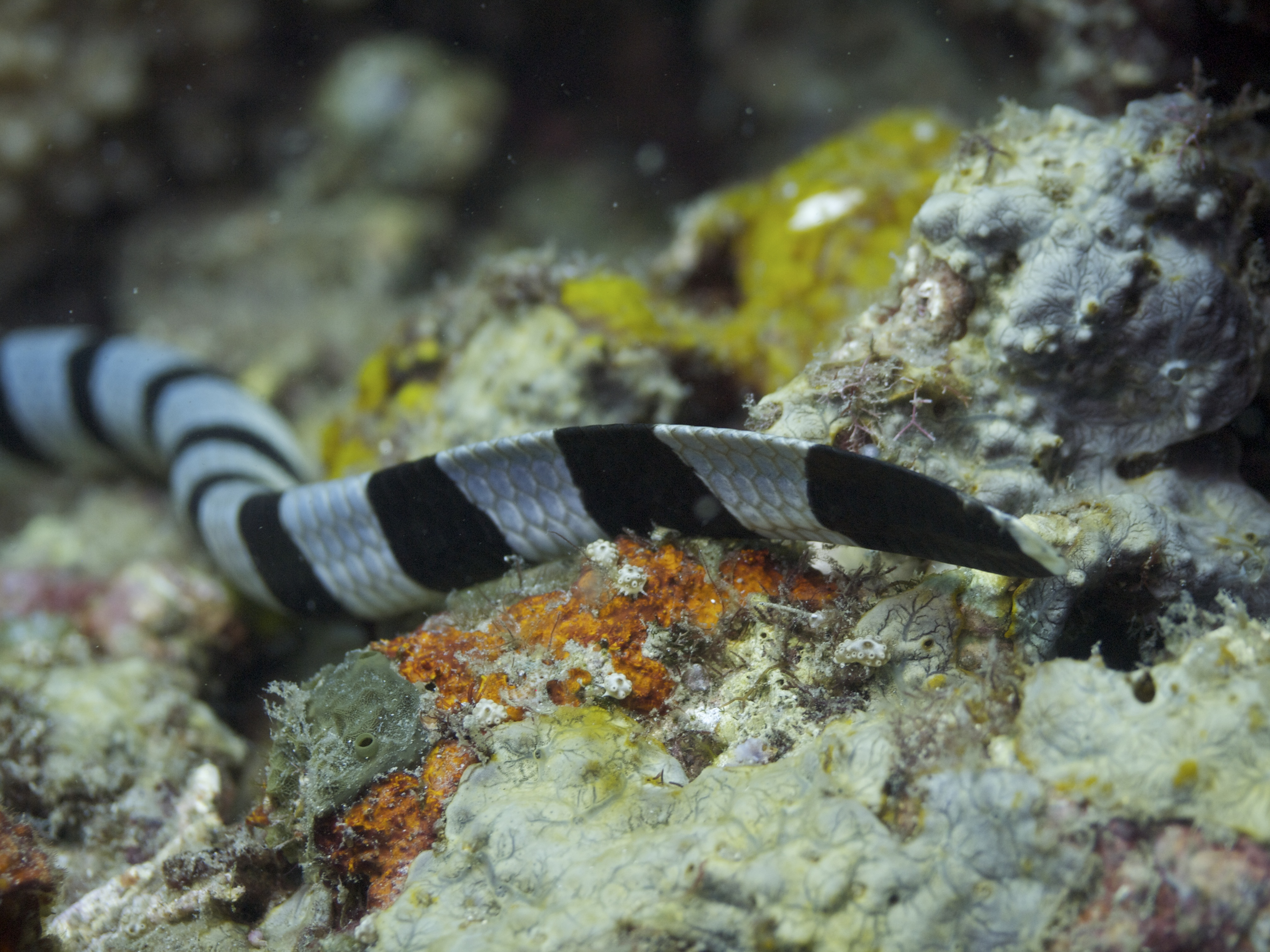
The characteristic yellow snout and paddle-like tail of L. colubrina, Zamboanguita, Philippines

The head of a yellow-lipped sea krait is black, with lateral nostrils and an undivided rostral scale. The upper lip and snout are characteristically colored yellow, and the yellow color extends backward on each side of the head above the eye to the temporal scales.

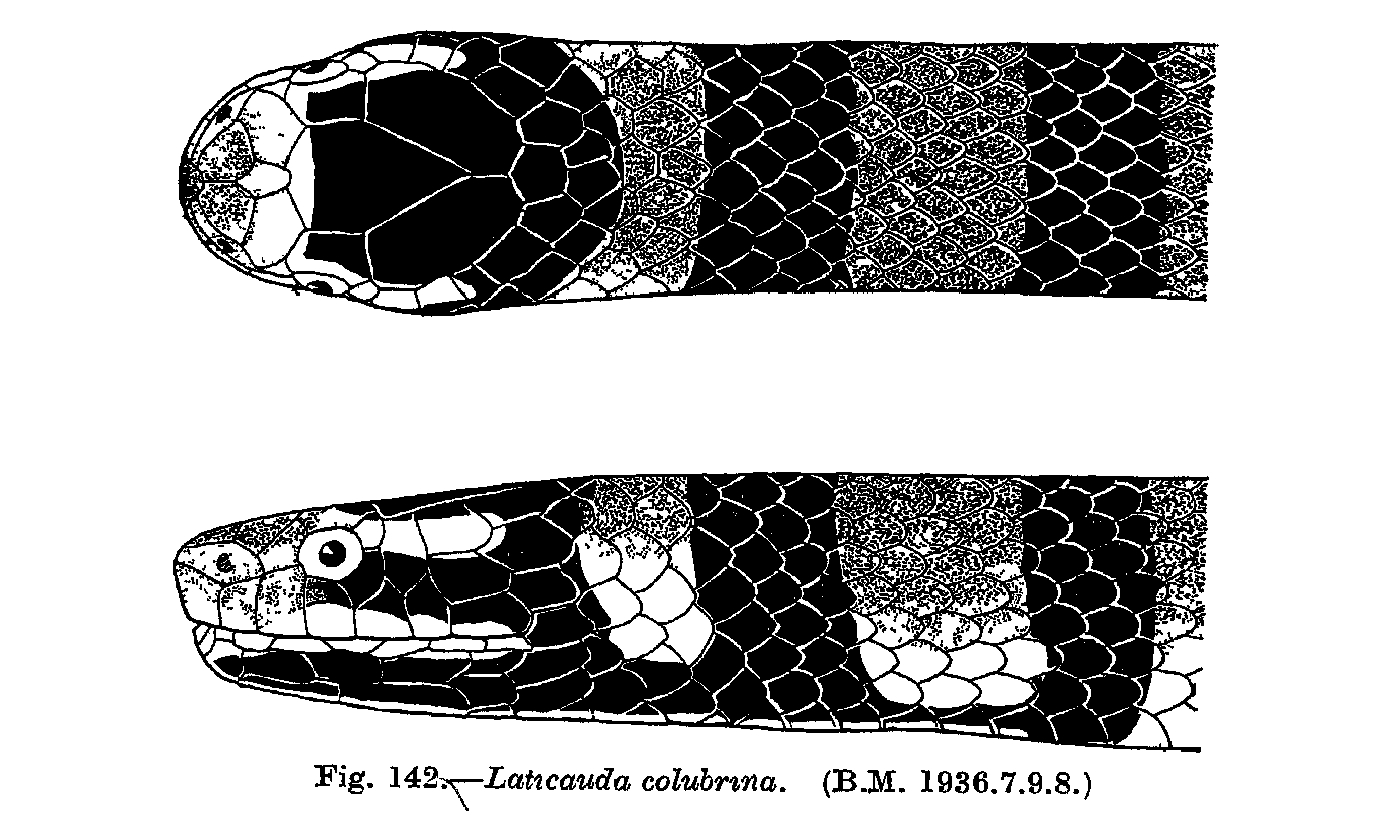
Scales of the head of L. colubrina

The body of the snake is subcylindrical, and is taller than it is wide. Its upper surface is typically a shade of blueish gray, while the belly is yellowish, with wide ventral scales that stretch from a third to more than half of the width of the body. Black rings of about uniform width are present throughout the length of the snake, but the rings narrow or are interrupted at the belly. The midbody is covered with 21 to 25 longitudinal rows of imbricated (overlapping) dorsal scales. The dorsal and lateral scales can be used to differentiate between this species and the similar yellow-lipped New Caledonian sea krait, which typically has fewer rows of scales and scales that narrow or fail to meet (versus the yellow-lipped sea krait's ventrally meeting dark bands). The tail of the snake is paddle-shaped and adapted to swimming.

On average, the total length of a male is 875 mm (2 ft 10.4 in) long, with a 13 cm (5.1 in) long tail. Females are significantly larger, with an average total length of 1.42 m (4 ft 8 in) and a tail length of 145 mm (5.7 in).

== Distribution and habitat ==
The yellow-lipped sea krait is widespread throughout the eastern Indian Ocean and Western Pacific. It can be found from the eastern coast of India, along the coast of the Bay of Bengal in Bangladesh, Myanmar, and other parts of Southeast Asia, to the Malay Archipelago and to some parts of southern China, Taiwan, and the Ryukyu Islands of Japan. The species is also common near Fiji and other Pacific islands within its range. Vagrant individuals have been recorded in Australia, New Caledonia, and New Zealand. Six specimens have been found around the North Island of New Zealand between 1880 and 2005, suspected to have come from populations based in Fiji and Tonga. It is the most common sea krait identified in New Zealand, and second-most seen sea snake after the yellow-bellied sea snake - common enough to be considered a native species, protected under the Wildlife Act 1953.

== Venom ==
The venom of this elapid, L. colubrina, is a very powerful neurotoxic protein, with a subcutaneous LD_{50} in mice of 0.45 mg/kg body weight. The venom is an α-neurotoxin that disrupts synapses by competing with acetylcholine for receptors on the postsynaptic membrane, similar to erabutoxins and α-bungarotoxins. In mice, lethal venom doses cause lethargy, flaccid paralysis, and convulsions in quick succession before death. Dogs injected with lethal doses produced symptoms consistent with fatal hypertension and cyanosis observed in human sea snake bite victims.

Some varieties of eels, which are a primary food source for yellow-lipped sea kraits, may have coevolved resistance to yellow-lipped sea krait venom. Gymnothorax moray eels taken from the Caribbean, where yellow-lipped sea kraits are not endemic, died after injection with doses as small as 0.1 mg/kg body weight, but Gymnothorax individuals taken from New Guinea, where yellow-lipped sea kraits are endemic, were able to tolerate doses as large as 75 mg/kg without severe injury.

== Behavior ==
Yellow-lipped sea krait swallowing a moray eel

Yellow-lipped sea kraits are semiaquatic. Juveniles stay in water and on adjacent coasts, but adults are able to move further inland and spend half their time on land and half in the ocean. Adult males are more terrestrially active during mating and hunt in shallower water, requiring more terrestrial locomotive ability. Adult females, though, are less active on land during mating and hunt in deeper water, requiring more aquatic locomotive ability. Because males are smaller, they crawl and swim faster than females.

Body adaptations, especially a paddle-like tail, help yellow-lipped sea kraits to swim. These adaptations are also found in more distantly related sea snakes (Hydrophiinae) because of convergent evolution, but because of the differences in motion between crawling and swimming, these same adaptations impede the snake's terrestrial motion. On dry land, a yellow-lipped sea krait can still move, but typically at only slightly more than a fifth of its swimming speed. In contrast, most sea snakes other than Laticauda spp. are virtually stranded on dry land.

When hunting, yellow-lipped sea kraits frequently head into deep water far from land, but return to land to digest meals, shed skin, and reproduce. Individuals return to their specific home islands, exhibiting philopatry. When yellow-lipped sea kraits on Fijian islands were relocated to different islands 5.3 km away, all recaptured individuals were found on their home islands in an average of 30.7 days.

Yellow-lipped sea kraits collected near the tip of Borneo had heavy tick infections.

=== Hunting and diet ===
Hunting is often performed alone, but L. colubrina kraits may also do so in large numbers in the company of hunting parties of giant trevally and goatfish. This cooperative hunting technique is similar to that of the moray eel, with the yellow-lipped sea kraits flushing out prey from narrow crevices and holes, and the trevally and goatfish feeding on fleeing prey.

While probing crevices with their heads, yellow-lipped sea kraits are unable to observe approaching predators and can be vulnerable. The snakes can deter predators, such as larger fish, sharks, and birds, by fooling them into thinking that their tail is their head, because the color and movement of the tail is similar to that of the snake's head. For example, the lateral aspect of the tail corresponds to the dorsal view of the head.

Yellow-lipped sea kraits primarily feed on varieties of eels (of the families Congridae, Muraenidae, and Ophichthidae), but also eat small fish (including those of the families Pomacentridae and Synodontidae). Males and females exhibit sexual dimorphism in hunting behavior, as adult females, which are significantly larger than males, prefer to hunt in deeper water for larger conger eels, while adult males hunt in shallower water for smaller moray eels. In addition, females hunt for only one prey item per foraging bout, while males often hunt for multiple items. After hunting, yellow-lipped sea kraits return to land to digest their prey.

=== Courtship and reproduction ===
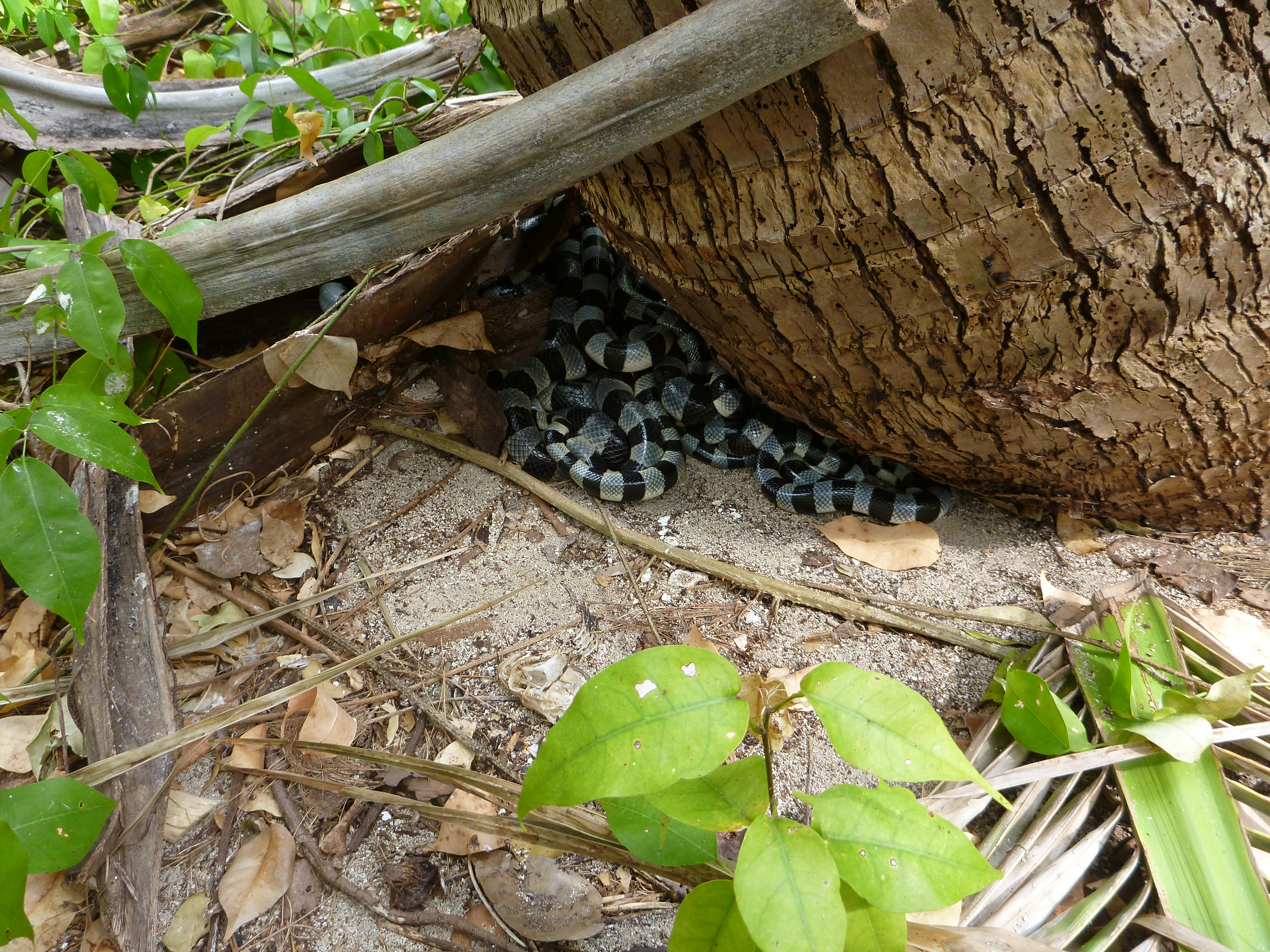
Multiple yellow-lipped sea kraits mating

The yellow-lipped sea krait is oviparous, meaning it lays eggs that develop outside of the body.

Each year during the warmer months of September through December, males gather on land and in the water around gently sloping areas at high tide. Males prefer to mate with larger females because they produce larger and more offspring.

When a male detects a female, he chases the female and begins courtship. Females are larger and slower than males, and many males escort and intertwine around a single female. The males then align their bodies with the female and rhythmically contract; the resulting mass of snakes can remain nearly motionless for several days. After courtship, the snakes copulate for about an average of two hours.

The female yellow-lipped sea kraits then lay as many as 10 eggs per clutch. The eggs are deposited in crevices where they remain until hatching. These eggs are very rarely found in the wild; only two nests have been definitively reported throughout the entire range of the species.

=== Interaction with humans ===
Because yellow-lipped sea kraits spend much of their time on land, they are often encountered by humans. They are frequently found in the water intake and exhaust pipes of boats. They are also attracted to light and can be distracted by artificial sources of light, including hotels and other buildings, on coasts.

Fewer bites from this species are recorded compared to other venomous species such as cobras and vipers, as it is less aggressive and tends to avoid humans. If they do bite, it is usually in self-defense when accidentally grabbed. Most sea snake bites occur when fishermen attempt to untangle the snakes from their fishing nets.

In the Philippines, yellow-lipped sea kraits are caught for their skin and meat; the meat is smoked and exported for use in Japanese cuisine. The smoked meat of a related Laticauda species, the black-banded sea krait, is used in Okinawan cuisine to make irabu-jiru (Japanese: イラブー汁, irabu soup).
