= Niue Nukutuluea Multiple-Use Marine Park =

Marine protected area in Niue

- The various zones of the Niue Nukutuluea Multiple-Use Marine Park
- Location: Niue
- Coordinates: 19°30′S 169°30′W
- Area: 318,140 km^{2} (122,830 sq mi)
- Established: April 2022

The Niue Nukutuluea Multiple-Use Marine Park is a marine protected area that encompasses the territorial waters and exclusive economic zone surrounding the Pacific island of Niue, covering a total area of 318,140 square kilometres (122,830 sq mi). Established in April 2022, it incorporated the Niue Moana Mahu Marine Protected Area and Beveridge Reef Nukutulueatama Special Management Area, which had been established in April 2020.

The marine park is divided into five zones with differing intended uses and permitted activities. The highest level of protection surrounds the biodiverse Beveridge Reef. The park is managed through a public–private partnership, with the aim of ensuring the sustainability of its fisheries and to encourage ecotourism.

== Geography ==
The protected area covers the entirety of Niue's ocean territory, from its coastline to the edge of its exclusive economic zone (EEZ). These waters are divided into five zones, which are subject to varying restrictions. The total area of the EEZ is 318,140 square kilometres (122,830 sq mi). This stretches from the 12 nautical miles (22 km; 14 mi) territorial waters baseline surrounding the island of Niue to up to 200 nautical miles (370 km; 230 mi) away. It reaches this distance to the south and southeast of Niue, where the EEZ abuts international waters. To the east a treaty defines its borders with the EEZ of the Cook Islands. To the north a treaty defines its borders with the EEZ of American Samoa. To the west, the EEZ meets the EEZ of Tonga, for which there is no treaty and a median line is assumed.

Within this area are at least three coral reefs, the largest of which is Beveridge Reef, along with numerous seamounts. Beveridge Reef lies southeast of the main island, and its Beveridge Reef Nukutulueatama Special Management Area extends for 3 nautical miles (5.6 km; 3.5 mi) around the irregularly shaped reef, an area which is defined as lying within a 10 nautical miles (19 km; 12 mi) by 11 nautical miles (20 km; 13 mi) box. The special area around Beveridge Reef falls within the Niue Moana Mahu Marine Protected Area. This almost triangular section of the EEZ is defined by lines extending from two points on the edge of the 24 nautical miles (44 km; 28 mi) contiguous zone, one going east to the border with the Cook Islands, and one going roughly south to the edge of Niue's EEZ.

== History ==
Historically, Niuean villages managed the ocean off their coastline, governing fishing through traditional practices. However, technological development led to catch rates exceeding those which could be managed sustainably through these methods. Technology also led to increased food exports, especially to overseas Niueans. As a result, fish biomass in Niue's waters decreased to regionally low levels. The Alofi North Marine Protected Area, established in the late 20th century, was depleted to the same degree as the rest of the island's waters, despite its official no-take designation.

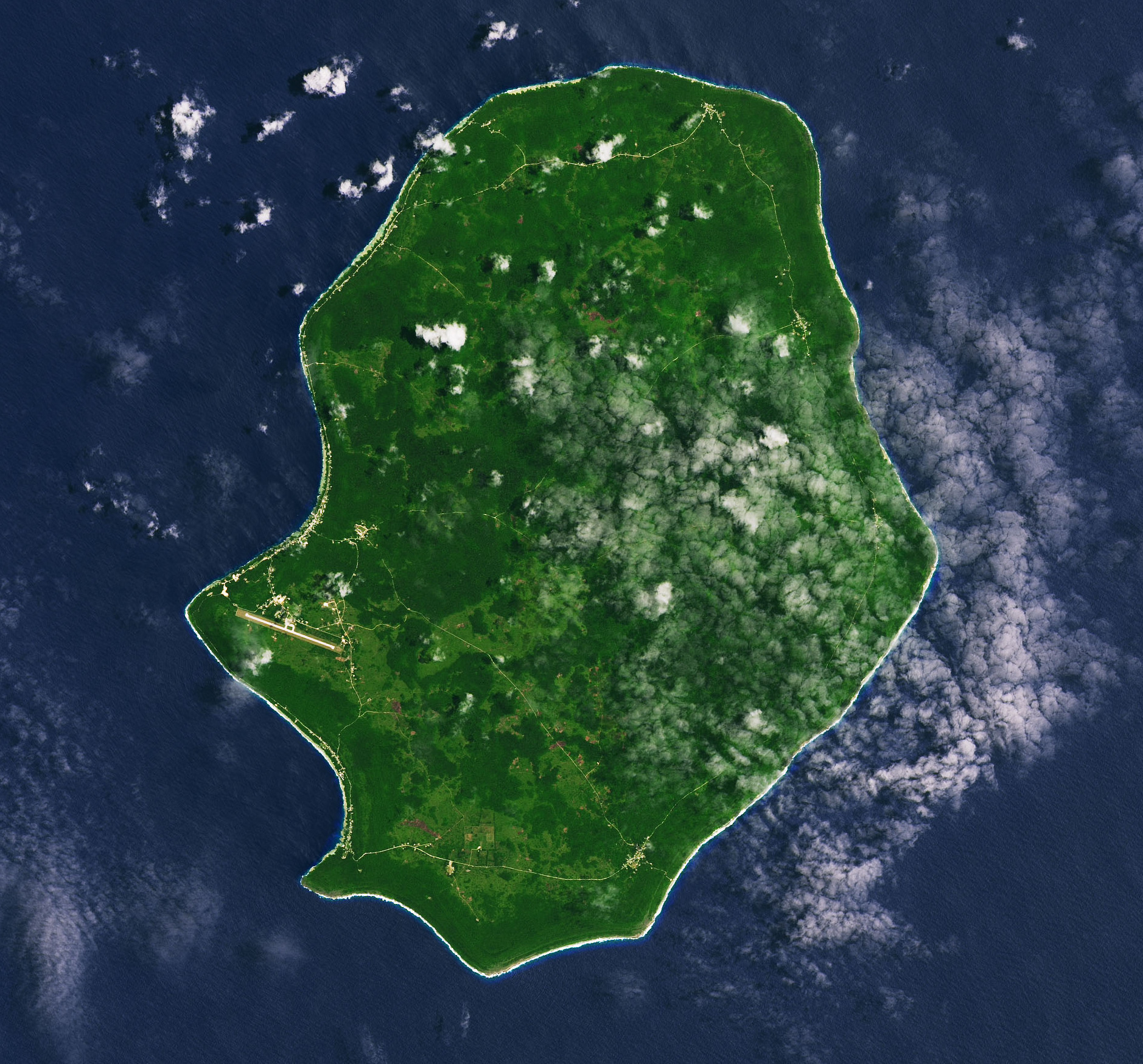
The island of Niue

In 2015 the Oceans 5 philanthropic group began working with the Niuean government to support ocean conservation, leading to the founding of the Tofia Niue NGO in 2016 and the beginning of a formal partnership between Tofia Niue and the Niuean government. In September 2016, in partnership with the Government of Niue, Tofia Niue, Oceans 5, SPC and the Ridge to Reef project, National Geographic Society’s Pristine Seas project led an expedition to Niue and Beveridge Reef to conduct a comprehensive biodiversity assessment of the remote ecosystem, thereby providing critical data for the marine spatial planning process. Following community consultations, the plans were officially announced in 2017, and marine spatial planning began in 2018. This planning was for a management plan covering the entire EEZ. The Niue Assembly established a legal basis for a marine protected area in September 2019. Further funding came from the National Geographic Society, the United Nations Development Programme, and the Global Environment Facility.

On 30 April 2020 the Niue Moana Mahu Marine Protected Area, including the Beveridge Reef Nukutulueatama Special Management Area, was established through legislation in the Niue Assembly. At 127,000 square kilometres (49,000 sq mi), it was at the time the second largest marine reserve after the Palau National Marine Sanctuary. The size of the protected area meant Niue exceeded the Aichi Target 11 of protecting 10% of each country's waters. The special protection of Beveridge Reef was driven by the importance of its links to the biodiversity around Niue island. In April 2022, the wider Niue Nukutuluea Multiple-Use Marine Park was established, with its borders incorporating the previously established protected areas. The government touted this as a way to not only ensure the sustainability of its national resources, but as a contribution to global efforts to tackle climate change and the Sustainable Development Goals.

== Biodiversity ==
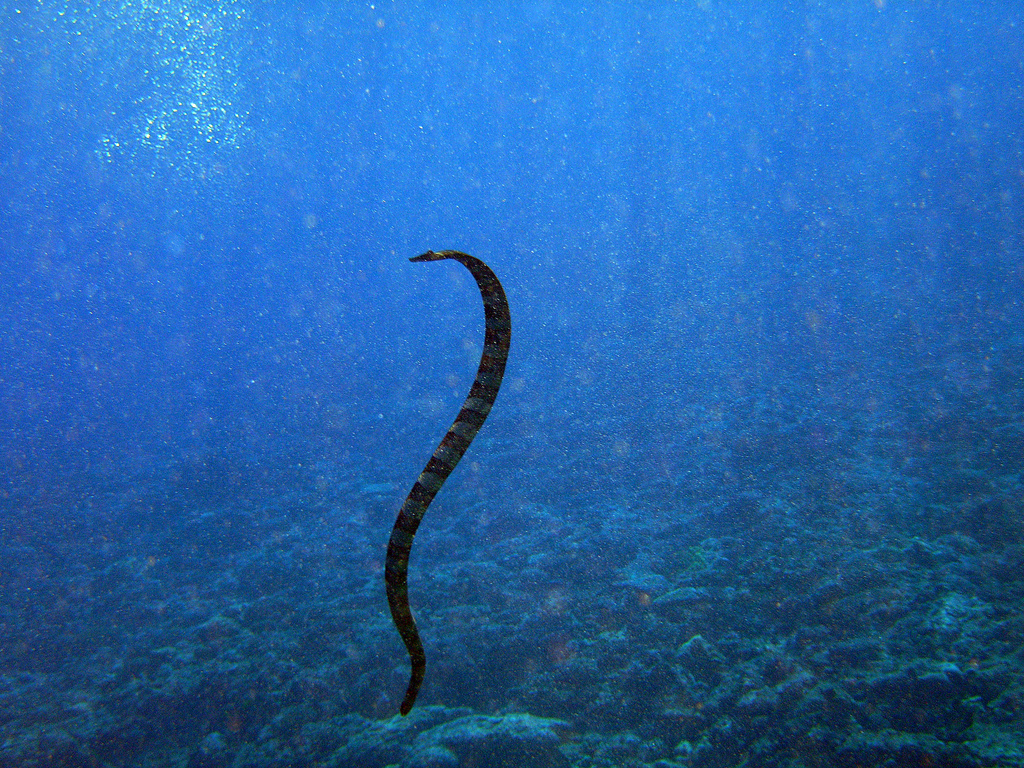
The katuali sea snake is endemic to Niue

Niue's waters have not been extensively surveyed, leaving much unknown. The marine terrain has extensively varied landforms, including chasms and caves. Overall, the area exhibits relatively low productivity compared to waters around other pacific islands, as it lacks upwelling water currents that bring large amounts of nutrients to the surface. This is likely linked to relatively low fish biomass, and relatively few seabirds being present in the area.

Especially in light of the area's low productivity, its ecosystems are threatened by overfishing and climate change. Cyclones have damaged shallow communities, and rising temperatures have caused coral bleaching.

The seafloor around Niue and Beveridge Reef is covered by a mixture of hard coral, coralline algae, Lobophora algae, turf algae, taller algae, and soft coral. This cover varies with habitat, depth, and location windward or leeward of each location. Other seafloor animals include giant clams, sea urchins, and smaller numbers of crinoids and sea cucumbers.

Almost 300 shallow-water fish species are known. Total biomass is much higher at Beveridge Reef than in the shallow waters surrounding Niue, due to the large number of sharks inhabiting the reef. Beveridge Reef has the world's highest concentration of grey reef sharks. Other large fish found within the marine park's shallow waters include whitetip reef sharks, spotted eagle rays, marbled whiprays, red snapper, black jacks, dogtooth tuna, giant trevally, humphead wrasse, and Heller's barracuda. The katuali sea snake is endemic to the area. Loggerhead sea turtles, green sea turtles, and hawksbill sea turtles can be found in shallow waters.

Fish that swim through the park's open waters include wahoo, mahi-mahi, yellowfin tuna, mackerel scad, freckled driftfish, great barracudas, striped marlins, rainbow runners, flying fish, silky sharks, trumpetfish, cornetfish, pilot fish, and shortfin mako sharks, in addition to some species also found in shallow waters. There are 32 known fish species found in the deep sea, with grey cutthroat eels and cusk-eels being the most abundant. Other relatively abundant species are deepwater red snappers and rusty jobfish. Gamba shrimp are common near the seafloor, as are amphipods.

Humpback whales breed in the waters around Niue, after migrating from Antarctica. Spinner dolphins and Blainville's beaked whales are other marine mammals that have been observed within the island's waters.

== Governance ==
The marine park is governed through a unifying spatial plan that divides it into five zones of different management regimes. 40% is the Niue Moana Mahu Marine Protected Area, in which fishing, mining, and hydrocarbon and mineral exploration are prohibited. Within this area is Beveridge Reef, which is further protected through the Beveridge Reef Nukutulueatama Special Management Area, which can have additional restrictions imposed in order to preserve the reef's biodiversity.

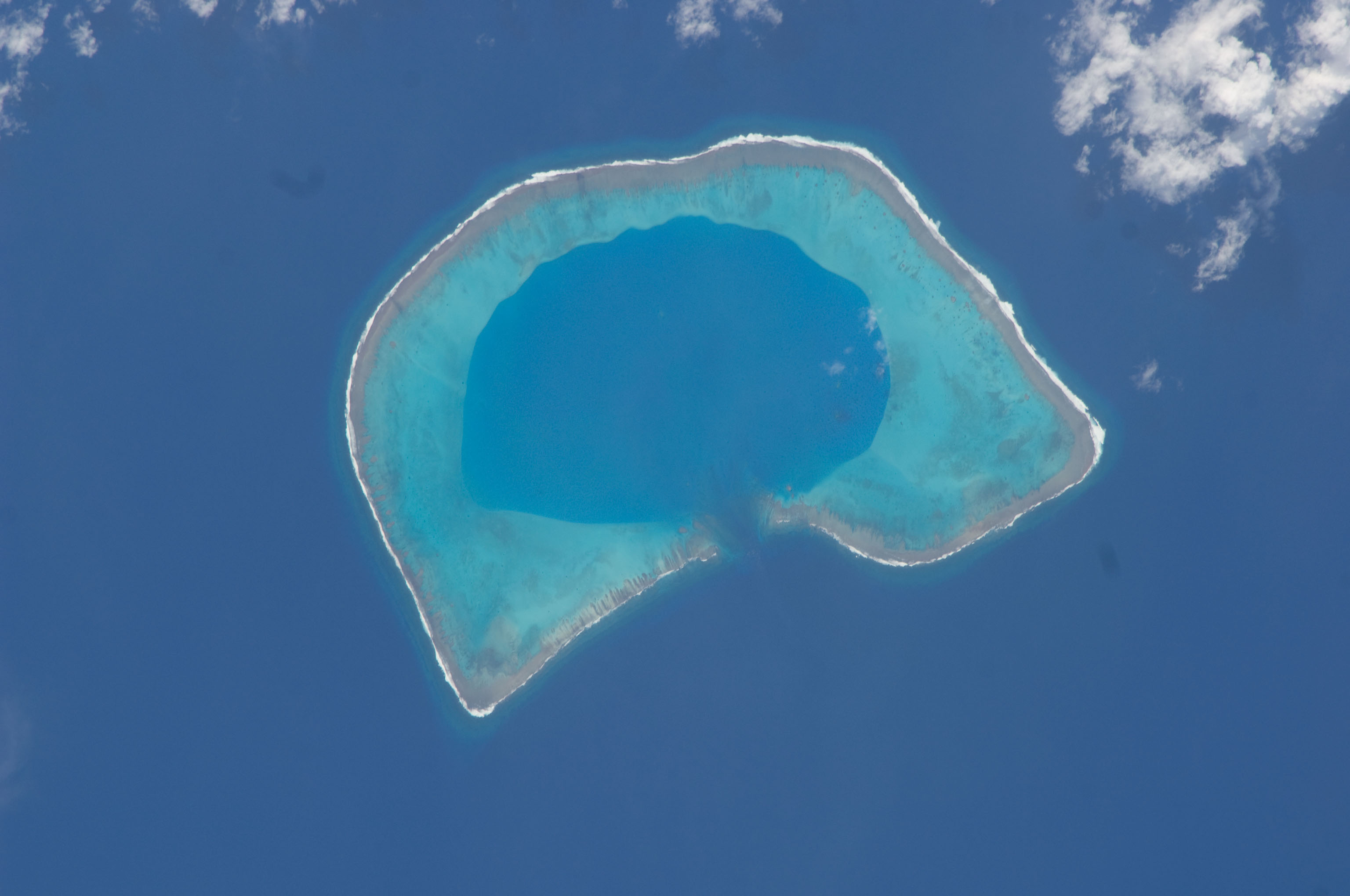
Beveridge Reef and its immediately surrounding waters are designated as a Special Management Area

The sea within 3 nautical miles (5.6 km; 3.5 mi) of Niue's coastline is a "subsistence special management area", managed by local villages. Collecting seafood remains part of life on the island. Extending from that zone to 24 nautical miles (44 km; 28 mi) is a "restricted commercial-use zone", which permits local and charter fishing. The last zone, making up 56% of the EEZ, is a "general-use zone" where commercial fishing is permitted, although it is a less productive area of ocean and currently has no large fishing operations. Mining is also theoretically permitted in the general-use zone, although no mining activity has taken place. Fines for illegal fishing can be as high as NZ$500,000 under standard procedures, with the government able to seek a larger penalty.

The marine park was developed through a public-private partnership called Niue Ocean Wide, which includes representatives of the Niuean government and the Tofia Niue NGO. The island's villages each have a marine management plan for the governance of the 3-nautical-mile (5.6 km; 3.5 mi) coastal zone. Low local enforcement capacity is partially addressed through regional cooperation, with the Royal New Zealand Air Force surveying the Moana Mahu area twice a year, and patrols from the Pacific Islands Forum Fisheries Agency and Western and Central Pacific Fisheries Commission run by nearby countries (the Cook Islands, Samoa, and Tonga) also monitor Niue's waters. The government is looking to increase the use of satellite surveillance.

The park is intended to stimulate eco-tourism. In addition to whale watching, tourists are permitted to swim with humpback whales. Large pelagic species such as wahoo, mahi-mahi, and yellowfin tuna are caught during big-game fishing. Other goals for the park include ensuring food security through sustainably managed fisheries, improving environmental health, and creating international leadership in conservation and tourism.

Some funding is generated through an "Ocean Conservation Credits" scheme, which allow people to pay to protect part of the area. This is intended to be an example of sustainable finance supporting the blue economy.

== See also ==
- Marae Moana
