= Beveridge Reef =

Atoll in Niue

Coordinates: 20°00′S 167°48′W

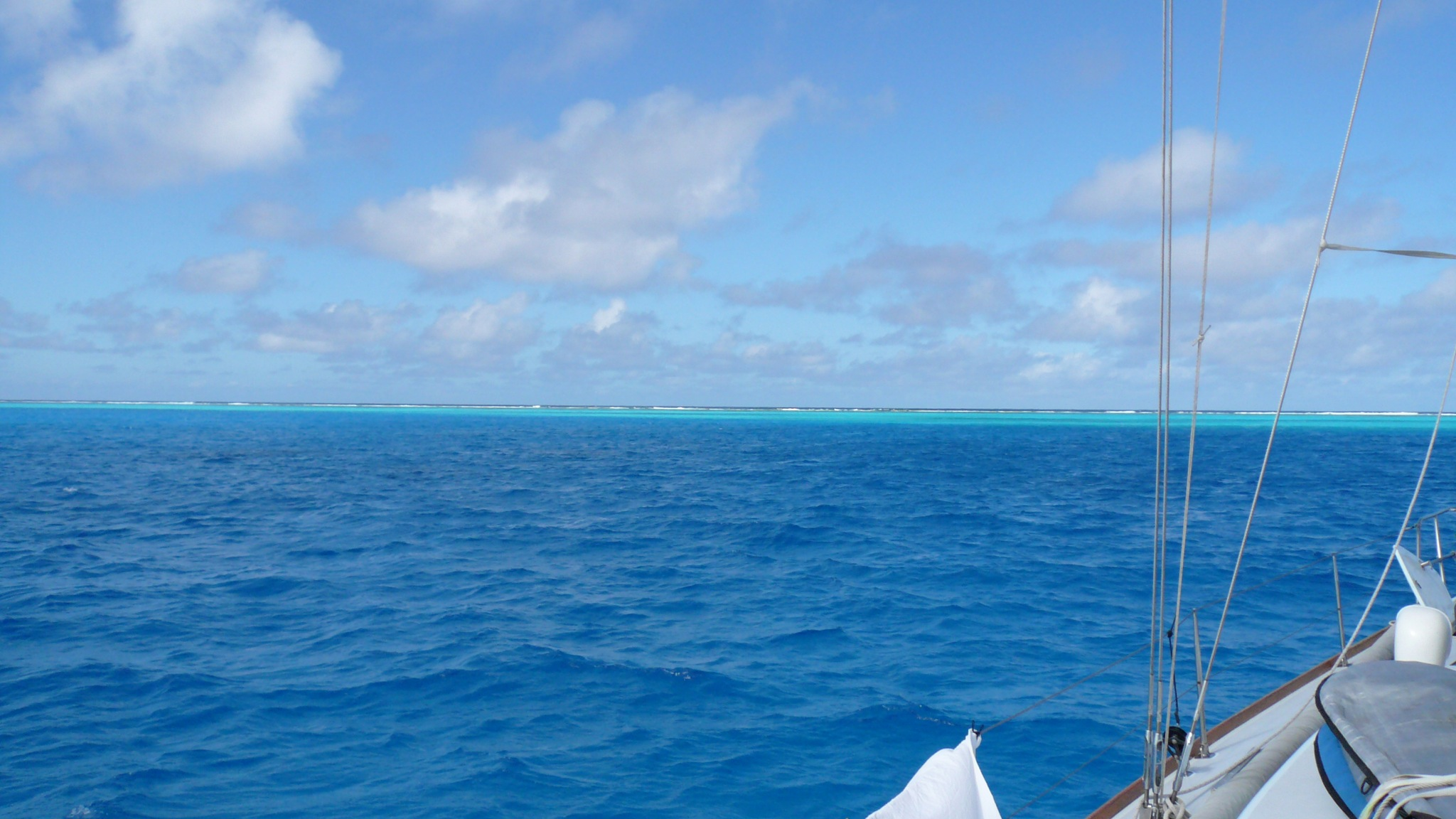
- Looking north across the lagoon
- Interactive map of Beveridge Reef

Geography
- Location: Exclusion Zone 5
- Total islands: 1

Administration
- Niue

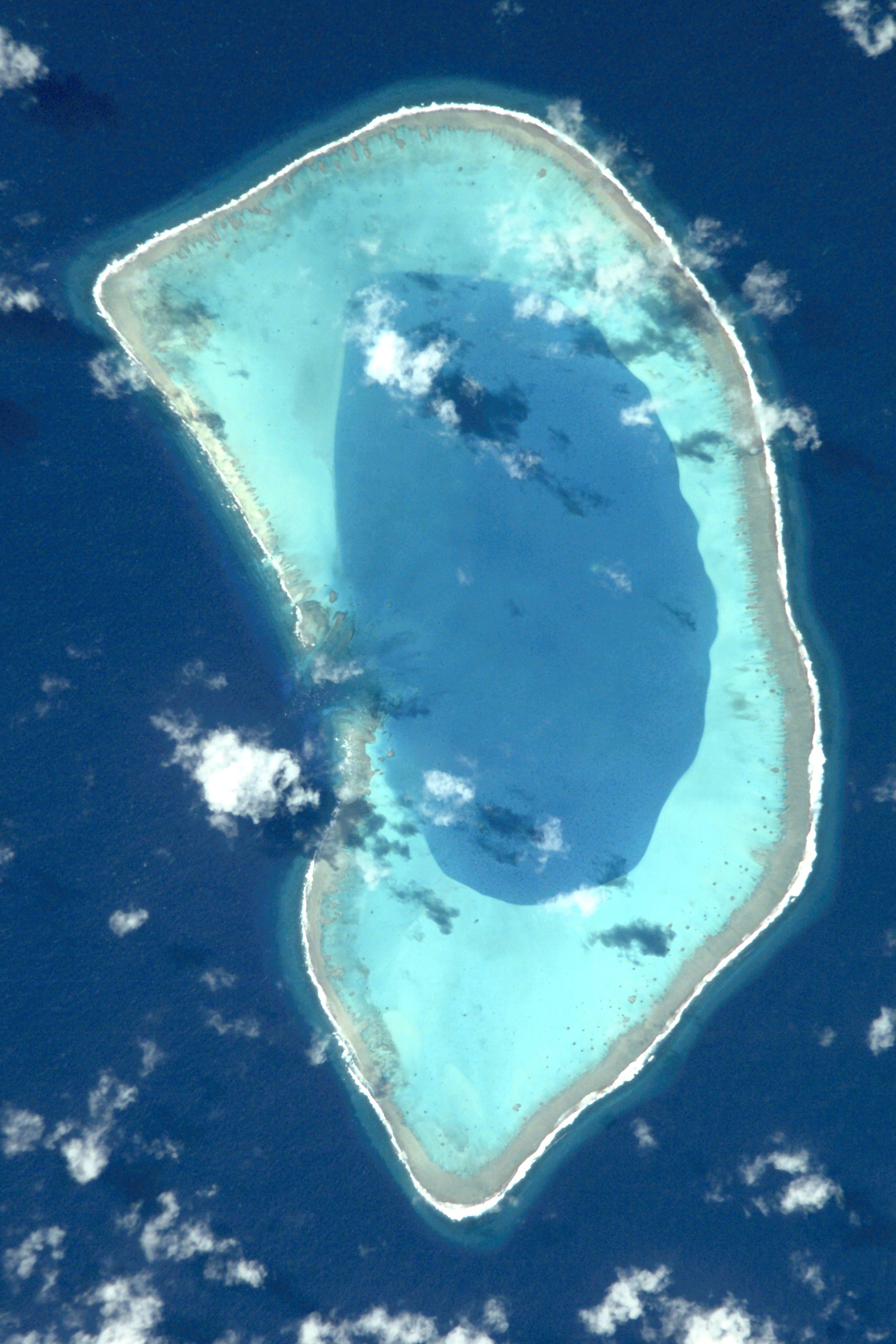
Beveridge Reef seen from space

Beveridge Reef (Niuean: Nukutulueatama) is an unpopulated coral atoll located in the Exclusive Economic Zone of Niue. It has been the cause of several fishing boats running aground or sinking. The reef is about 147 miles (237 km) from Niue and 520 miles (840 km) from the Cook Islands.

The reef is designated as a Special Management Area within the Niue Nukutuluea Multiple-Use Marine Park, and is listed as an Important Shark and Ray Area by the International Union for Conservation of Nature.

== Geography ==
The reef is a seamount whose summit reaches within 10 metres of the ocean surface. The reef is normally submerged, with a small part visible at low tide. It has an area of 56 square kilometres.

== History ==
According to Rarotongan oral tradition, the reef was once an island with many coconut palms, which was swept away by a hurricane. The reef was first observed by Europeans in 1847, when Captain Lower-Tinger, commander of the brig Beveridge, named it after his ship. In 2020 the reef was protected as part of the Niue Nukutuluea Multiple-Use Marine Park.

== Ecology ==
The reef is home to the endangered Grey reef shark, as well as the Whitetip reef shark, Scalloped hammerhead, and Galapagos shark. Rays include the Spotted eagle ray, Pink whipray, and Round ribbontail ray. Other common species observed include Acanthurus nigroris, Ctenochaetus striatus, and Chlorurus sordidus. Blainville's beaked whales and Humpback whales were also present.

A genetic study of representative reef species found that Beveridge Reef was a regional centre of genetic diversity.

== Wrecks ==
The reef has been called "the nightmare of navigators", and is the site of at least six shipwrecks:

- Legerdemain (UK), a barque wrecked on the north east side of the reef in 1852
- James H. Bruce (USA), a schooner wrecked on the north east side of the reef in 1918
- Nicky Lou (USA), a large fishing trawler wrecked on the east side of the reef in 1992
- Liberty (NZ), a small fishing vessel wrecked inside the lagoon on the east side in 2007
- Avanti (BVI), a catamaran wrecked beside the Liberty on the east side of the lagoon in 2017
- Chuan I Shin (TWN), a large longline fishing trawler wrecked on the south end of the reef in 2022
