= Crocker's sea snake =

Conservation status
- Vulnerable (IUCN 3.1)

Scientific classification
- Kingdom: Animalia
- Phylum: Chordata
- Class: Reptilia
- Order: Squamata
- Suborder: Serpentes
- Family: Elapidae
- Genus: Laticauda
- Species: L. crockeri

Binomial name
- Laticauda crockeri Slevin, 1934
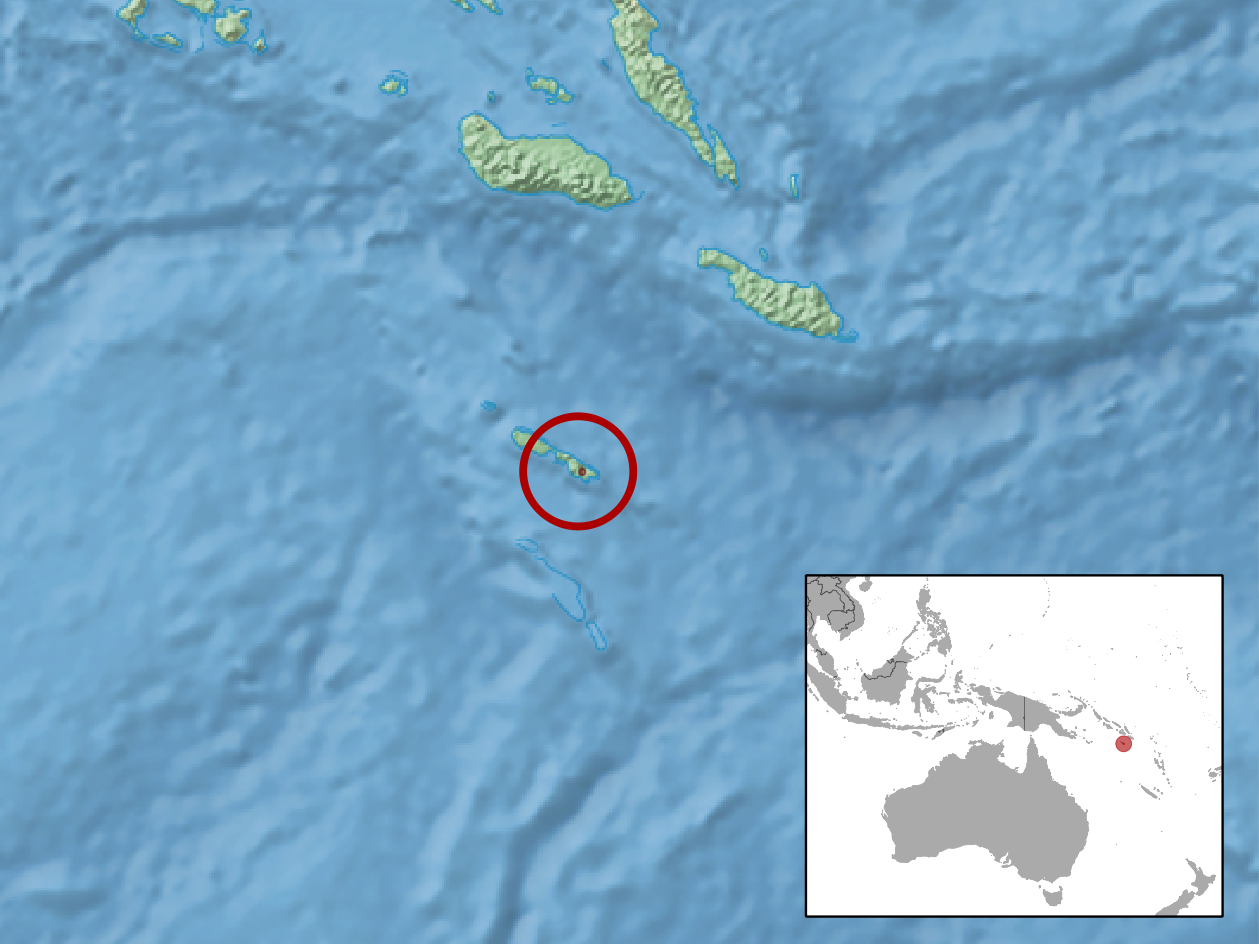

Synonyms
- Laticauda laticaudata wolffi Volsøe, 1956; Laticauda laticaudata crockeri Volsøe, 1958

Species of snake

Crocker's sea snake (Laticauda crockeri) is a species of venomous snake in the subfamily Laticaudinae, the sea kraits, of the family Elapidae, which includes the cobras, mambas, sea snakes, taipans and related species . The species is endemic to the Solomon Islands.

== Taxonomy ==
Crocker's sea snake was first formally described in 1934 by the American herpetologist Joseph Richard Slevin with its type locality given as Lake Te-Nggano on Rennell Island in the Solomon Islands. This species is classified in the genus Laticauda, the sea kraits, which is the only genus in the monotypic subfamily Laticaudinae. The Laticaudinae is cassified within the family Elapidae, the cobras, coral snakes, mambas, taipans, sea snakes and related taxa.

== Etymology ==
Crocker's sea snake has the specific name, crockeri, is in honor of American railroad magnate Charles Templeton Crocker (1885-1948), who allowed the California Academy of Sciences to use his yacht, the Zaca, for scientific expeditions.

== Geographic range ==
Crocker's sea snake is endemic to Lake Tegano, a brackish lake on Rennell Island in the Solomon Islands.

== Description ==
Crocker's sea snake is sexually dimorphic, with females growing to be longer and heavier than males. Females may attain a snout-to-vent length (SVL) of 80 cm (31 in), but males may attain only 62 cm (24 in) in SVL. Maximum tail length is about 9 cm (3.5 in) in both sexes. The overall colour is a uniform dark brown with a yellow patch near the anus.

== Conservation status ==
Crocker's sea snake is currently listed as "Vulnerable" by the International Union for Conservation of Nature due to the extremely limited distribution of the species.
