= Laticauda guineai =

Conservation status
- Near Threatened (IUCN 3.1)

Scientific classification
- Kingdom: Animalia
- Phylum: Chordata
- Class: Reptilia
- Order: Squamata
- Suborder: Serpentes
- Family: Elapidae
- Genus: Laticauda
- Species: L. guineai

Binomial name
- Laticauda guineai Heatwole, Busack & Cogger, 2005

Species of snake

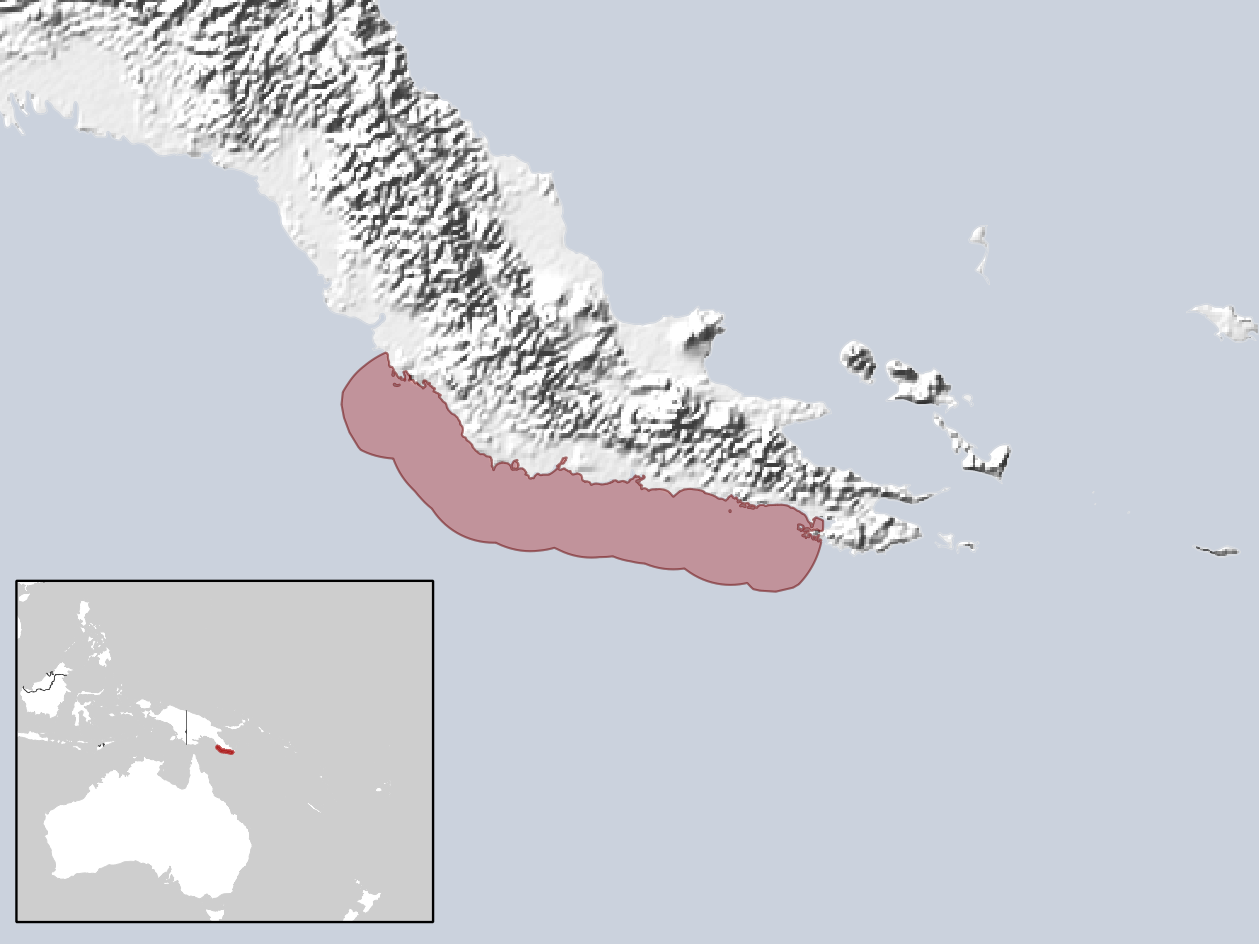
Geographic distribution of Laticauda guineai

Laticauda guineai is a species of venomous sea snake in the family Elapidae. The species, which was first described by Heatwole, Busack and Cogger in 2005, is native to waters off southern New Guinea.

== Etymology ==
The specific name, guineai, is in honor of Australian zoologist Michael Leonard Guinea.

== Habitat ==
The preferred natural habitat of L. guineai is shallow tropical seas and coral reefs, to a depth of 10 m (33 ft).

== Behavior ==
L. guineai is amphibious, often leaving the water to come onto land.

== Reproduction ==
L. guineai is oviparous. The eggs are laid on land.
