= Laticauda frontalis =

Conservation status
- Near Threatened (IUCN 3.1)

Scientific classification
- Kingdom: Animalia
- Phylum: Chordata
- Class: Reptilia
- Order: Squamata
- Suborder: Serpentes
- Family: Elapidae
- Genus: Laticauda
- Species: L. frontalis

Binomial name
- Laticauda frontalis (De Vis, 1905)

Species of snake

Laticauda frontalis is a sea snake in the family Elapidae first described by De Vis in 1905. It is native to waters off New Caledonia and Vanuatu. It exclusively eats eels.
