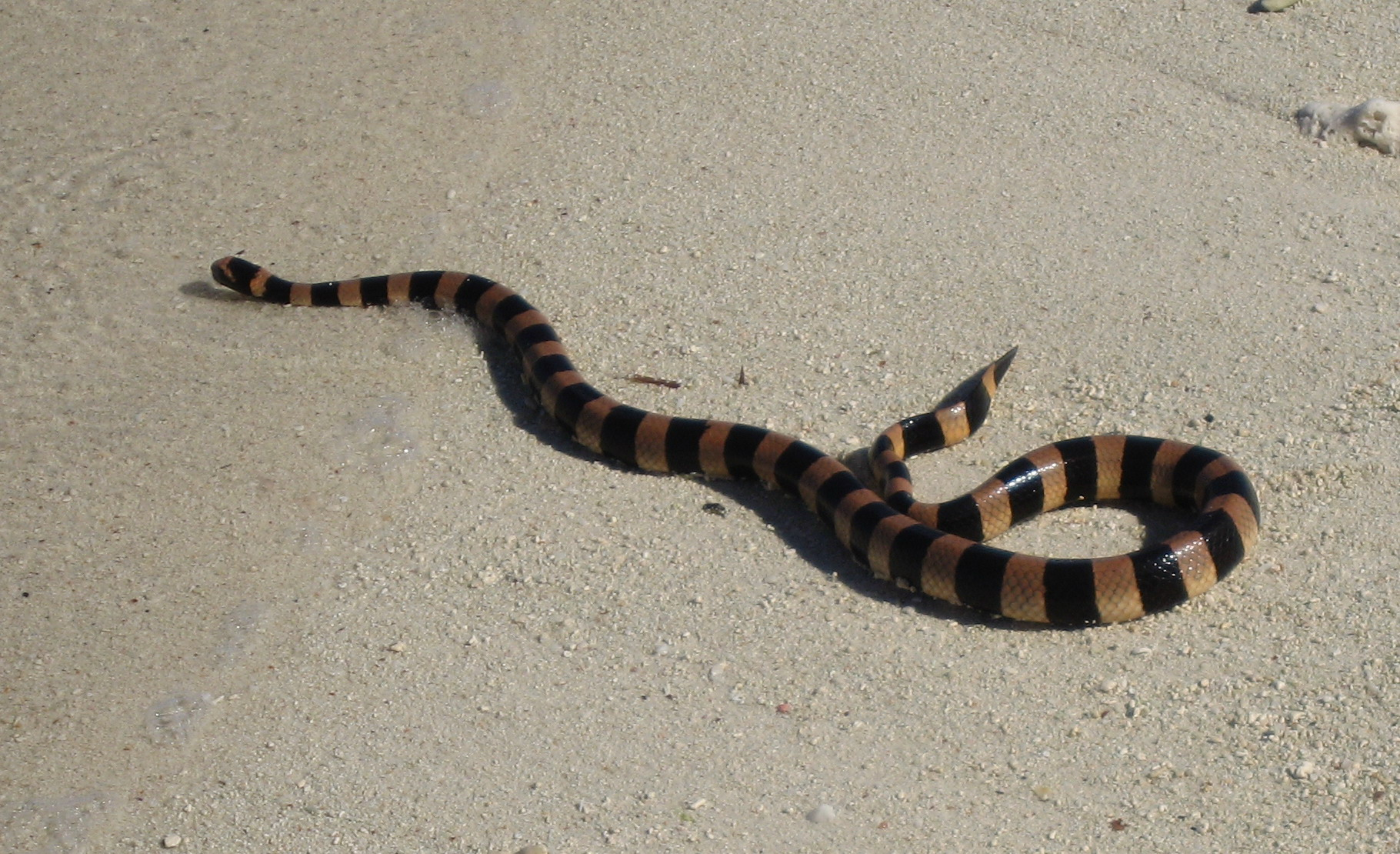
- Laticauda saintgironsi

Conservation status
- Least Concern (IUCN 3.1)

Scientific classification
- Kingdom: Animalia
- Phylum: Chordata
- Class: Reptilia
- Order: Squamata
- Suborder: Serpentes
- Family: Elapidae
- Genus: Laticauda
- Species: L. saintgironsi

Binomial name
- Laticauda saintgironsi Cogger & Heatwole, 2006
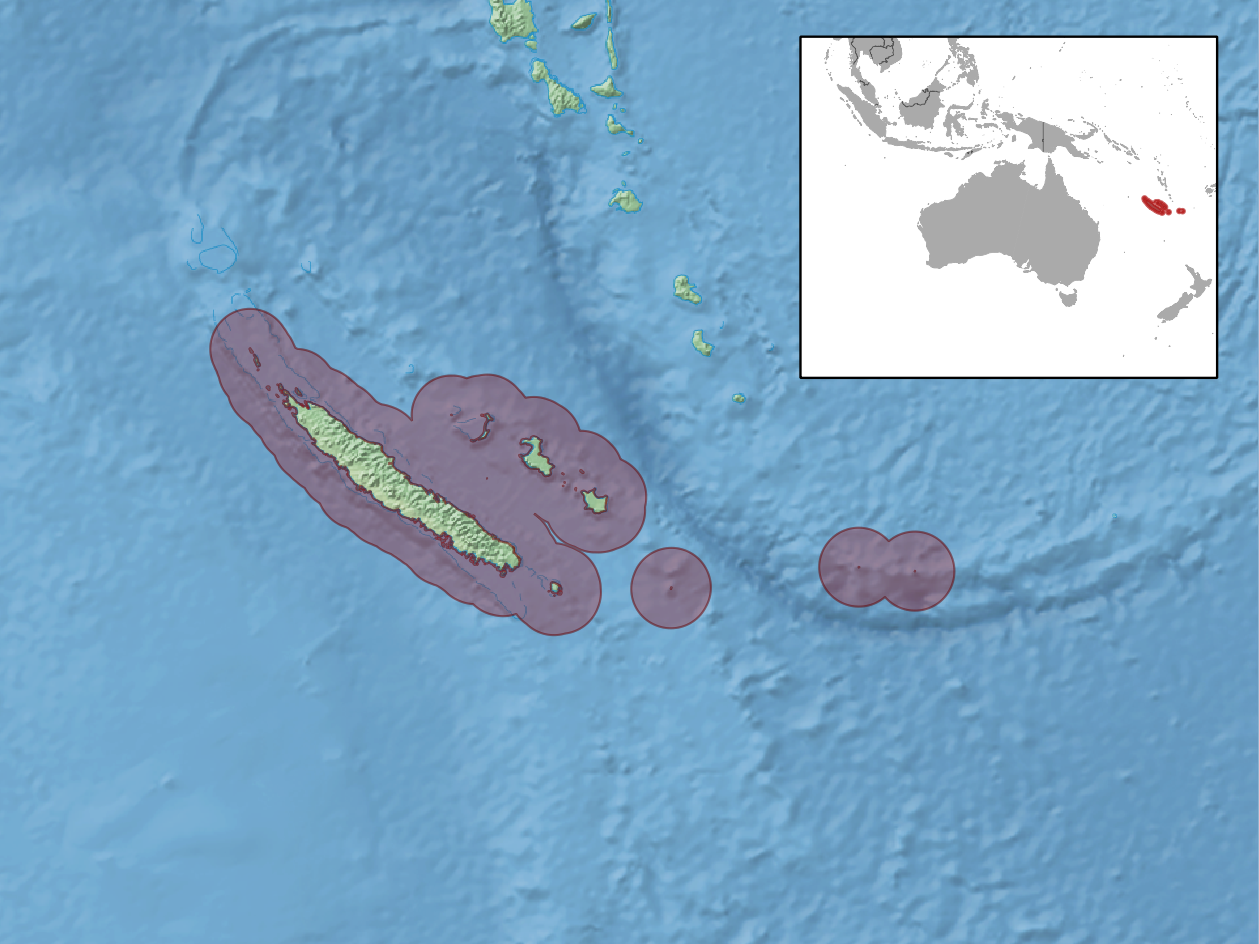

= New Caledonian sea krait =

Species of snake

The New Caledonian sea krait (Laticauda saintgironsi) is a species of venomous snake in the subfamily Laticaudinae of the family Elapidae. The species is native to the waters around New Caledonia.

== Etymology ==
The specific name, saintgironsi, is in honor of French herpetologist Hubert Saint Girons.

== Geographic range ==
L. saintgironsi is endemic to New Caledonia, including the Loyalty Islands. It is very rarely found outside of its native range (one specimen was found in New Zealand in 1925), likely due to Laticauda species tending to spend time onshore or in shallow water, limiting their chance to encounter oceanic currents.

== Habitat ==
The natural habitats of L. saintgironsi are marine, intertidal, and supratidal, from a depth of 80 m (260 ft) to an altitude of 100 m (330 ft).

== Description ==
L. saintgironsi exhibits sexual dimorphism, with females growing larger than males. Maximum recorded snout-to-vent length (SVL) for a male is 81.7 cm (32.2 in). Maximum recorded SVL for a female is 109 cm (43 in). The upper lip is yellow or cream-colored, and the rostral scale is undivided. Specimens can be identified by this yellow upper lip, which is present in both this species and the Yellow-lipped sea krait, and the presence of 21 rows of mid-body scales, compared to the yellow-lipped sea krait's 23 banded rows that meet ventrally.

== Diet ==
The diet of L. saintgironsi consists of non-spiny anguilliform fishes, with the lipspot moray Gymnothorax chilospilus representing about half of the prey.

== Parasites ==
Only a few parasites have been recorded for the New Caledonian sea krait, including camallanid nematodes.

== Reproduction ==
L. saintgironsi is oviparous.
