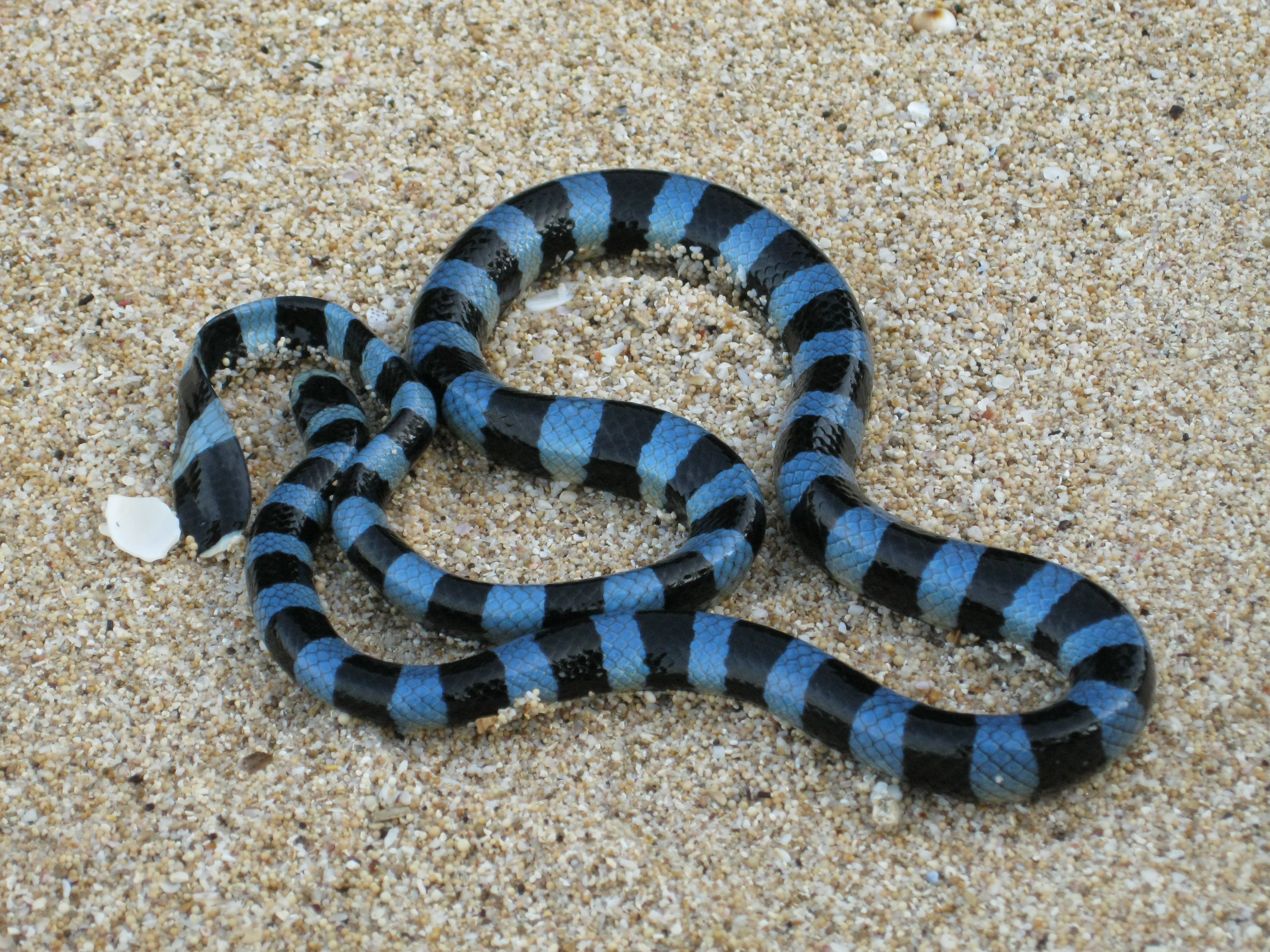

Conservation status
- Least Concern (IUCN 3.1)

Scientific classification
- Kingdom: Animalia
- Phylum: Chordata
- Class: Reptilia
- Order: Squamata
- Suborder: Serpentes
- Family: Elapidae
- Genus: Laticauda
- Species: L. laticaudata

Binomial name
- Laticauda laticaudata (Linnaeus, 1758)

Synonyms
- Coluber laticaudatus Linnaeus, 1758; Laticauda scutata Laurenti, 1768; Platurus laticaudatus Girard, 1858

= Blue-lipped sea krait =

Species of snake

The blue-lipped sea krait (Laticauda laticaudata), also known as the blue-banded sea krait or common sea krait, is a species of venomous sea snake in the subfamily Laticaudinae of the family Elapidae. It is found in the Indian and Western Pacific Oceans.

== Taxonomy ==
The blue-lipped sea krait was one of the many species originally described by Carl Linnaeus in his landmark 1758 10th edition of Systema Naturae, where it was given the binomial name Coluber laticaudatus. There are two subspecies, Laticauda laticaudata laticaudata and Laticauda laticaudata affinis.

== Description ==
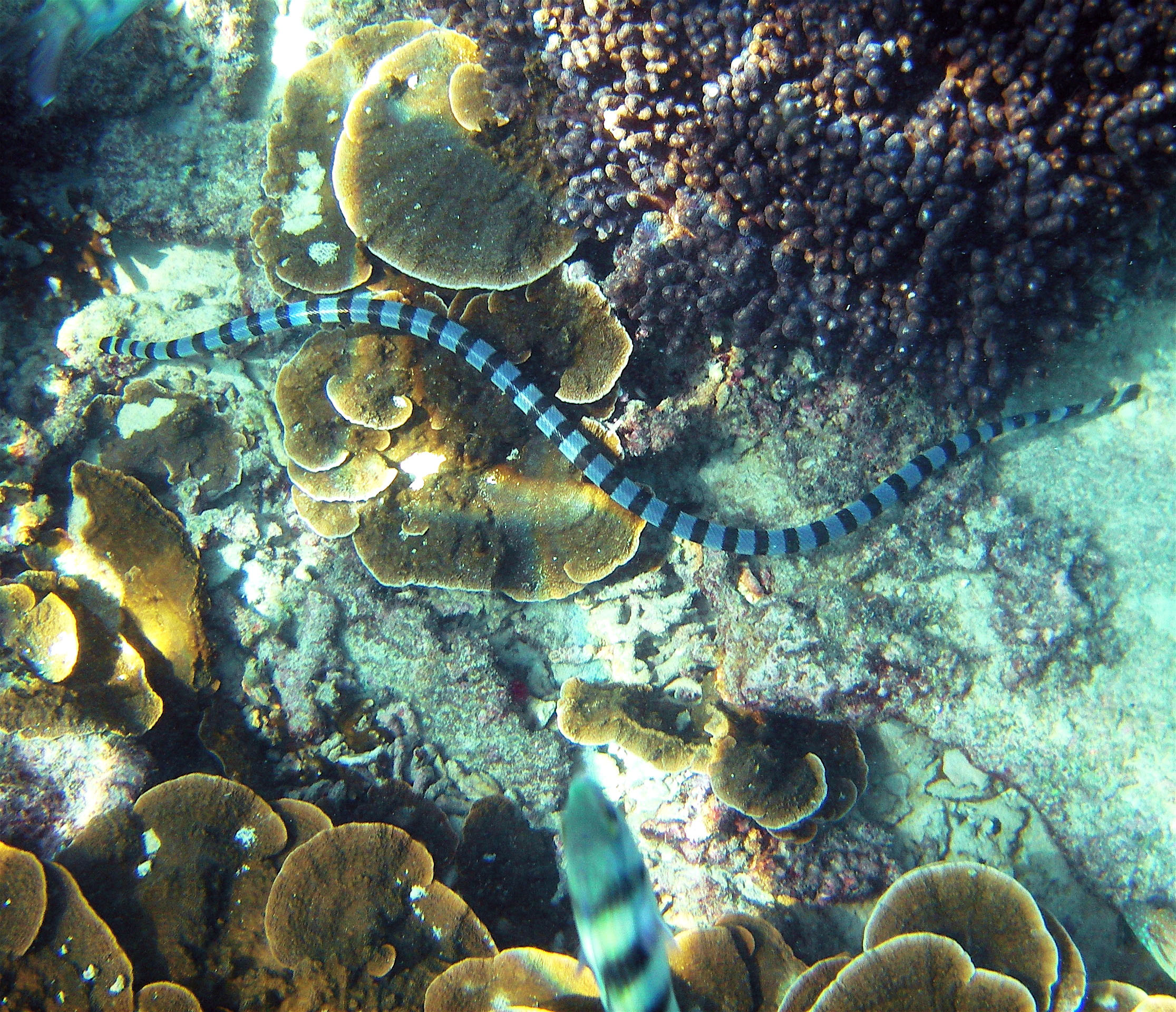
L. laticaudata hunting in the coral reefs offshore in Ko Samui, Thailand.

Ventral scales of this snake are large, one-third to more than one-half the width of the body; the nostrils are lateral; nasal scales are separated by internasals; 19 longitudinal rows of imbricate scales are found at midbody; no azygous prefrontal shield is present; rostral scales are undivided; ventrals number 225–243; subcaudals number 38–47 in males, females have 30–35 (ventral and subcaudal counts after Smith 1943:443). The upper lip is dark brown. Total length varies with sex: males are 910 mm (36 in), females are 1,070 mm (42 in); tail lengths are similar: 110 mm (4.3 in). The 19 rows of scales and the dark brown upper lip can be used to differentiate the blue-lipped sea krait from other Laticauda species.

== Distribution and habitat ==
This species is found in the Indian and Western Pacific Oceans: Bay of Bengal (Bangladesh, East India, Andaman & Nicobar Islands, Sri Lanka, Myanmar, Thailand), coasts of Malay Peninsula to Indonesia, Timor-Leste, New Guinea, the Philippines, off the coasts of Fujian and Taiwan, Japan, Polynesia, Melanesia, Solomon Islands, New Caledonia, Palau, Vanuatu, Fiji, and Australia (Queensland). One specimen was found in Devonport, New Zealand in 2011 and again in January 2025, however it died shortly after being taken to Kelly Tarlton's Sea Life Aquarium. The blue-lipped sea snake is spread all over the west pacific, making it known as the common sea krait. Sea kraits forage in reefs and return to land to digest their prey, mate, slough, and lay their eggs. Sea krait experience rapid temperature shifts when going from water to land. They'll often mitigate these effects by seeking shelter from direct sunlight.

== Special features ==
This snake is known to warm up in wedge-tailed shearwater burrows.
