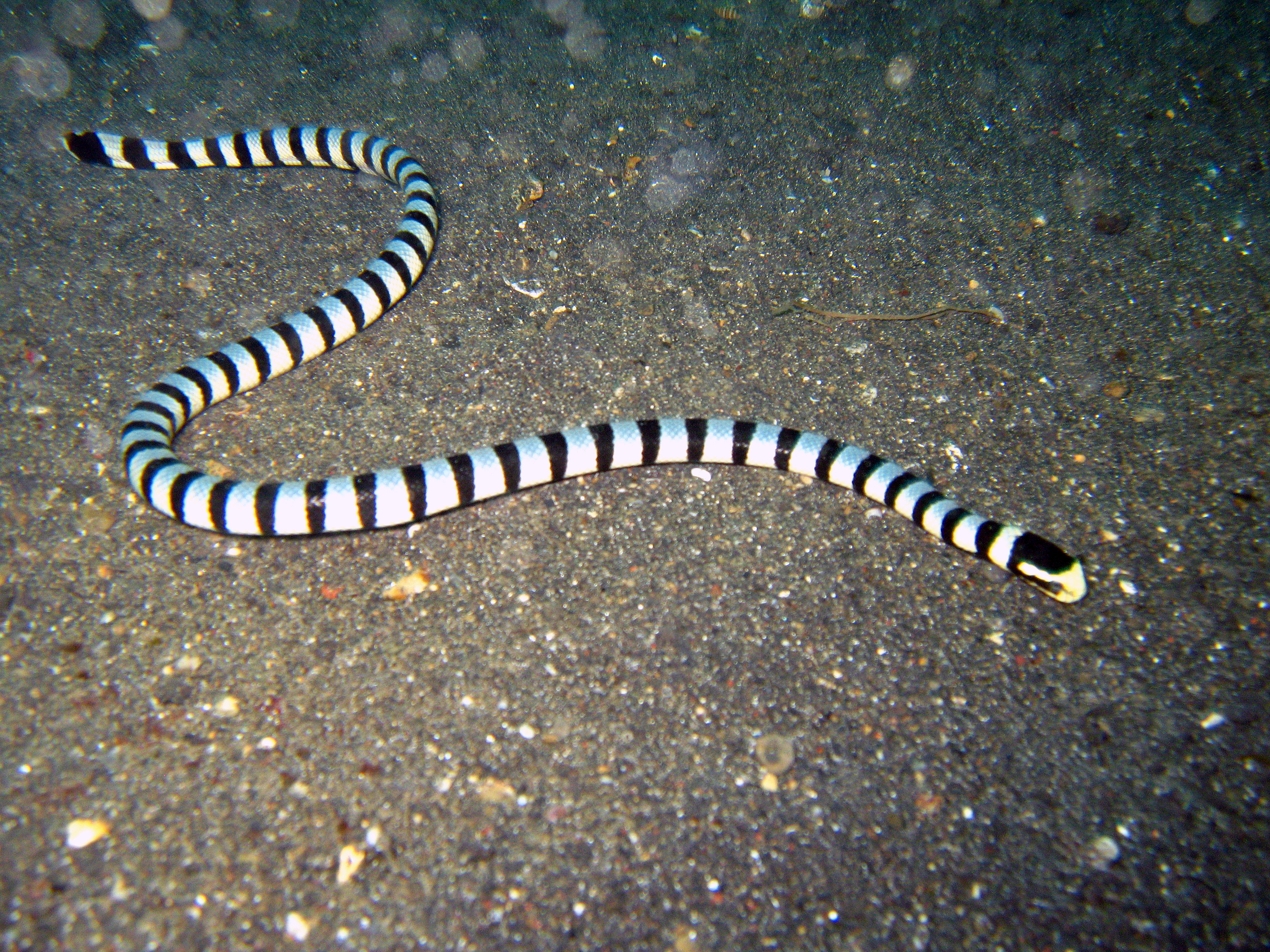
- Laticauda colubrina

Scientific classification
- Kingdom: Animalia
- Phylum: Chordata
- Class: Reptilia
- Order: Squamata
- Suborder: Serpentes
- Family: Elapidae
- Subfamily: Laticaudinae; Cope, 1876
- Genus: Laticauda; Laurenti, 1768

Type species
- Laticauda laticaudata (Linnaeus, 1758)

Species
- Eight, see text

= Sea krait =

Genus of snakes

Sea kraits are a genus of venomous snakes belonging to the genus Laticauda and the subfamily Laticaudinae. They are semiaquatic, and retain the wide ventral scales typical of terrestrial snakes for moving on land, but also have paddle-shaped tails for swimming. Unlike fully aquatic ovoviviparous sea snakes, sea kraits are oviparous and must come to land to digest prey and lay eggs. They also have independent evolutionary origins into aquatic habitats, with sea kraits diverging earlier from other Australasian elapids. Thus, sea kraits and sea snakes are an example of convergent evolution into aquatic habitats within the Hydrophiinae snakes. Sea kraits are also often confused with land kraits (genus Bungarus), which are not aquatic.

== Description ==
Sea kraits are semiaquatic and possess morphological adaptations to both land and sea. Laticauda species show traits intermediate between those of sea snakes and terrestrial elapids. They have a vertically flattened and paddle-shaped tail (similar to sea snakes), laterally positioned nostrils, and broad, laterally expanded ventral scales (similar to terrestrial elapids). Their body has a striped pattern, nasal scales separated by inter-nasals scales, and a maxillary bone that extends forwards beyond the palatine bone. Members of Laticauda can grow to 1.5 m (4.9 ft) long.

== Distribution ==
Colubrine sea krait (Laticauda colubrina) off Samal Island in Davao, Philippines

Laticauda species are found throughout the South and Southeast Asian islands spreading from India in the west, north as far as Japan, and southeast to Fiji. They occasionally wander south to the Eastern coast of Australia and New Zealand (Laticauda colubrina being the most common example in New Zealand). However, no locally breeding populations are known to exist in these areas. Sea kraits typically live in the littoral zone of coastal waters and are semi-terrestrial, spending time ashore and in shallow waters, as well as around coral reefs.

== Diet ==
Laticauda species feed in the ocean, mostly eating moray and conger eels, and some squid, crabs, and fish. They have never been observed feeding on land.

== Behavior ==
Laticauda species are often active at night, which is when they prefer to hunt. Though they possess highly toxic venom, these snakes are usually shy and reclusive, and in New Caledonia, where they are called tricot rayé ("striped sweater"), children play with them. Bites are rare, but must be treated immediately. Bites are more likely to occur under low light conditions (night), and when the snake is roughly handled (e.g. grabbed "hard") while in the water, or having been abruptly taken from the water. When these snakes are on land, bites are extremely rare. Black-banded sea kraits, numbering in the hundreds, form hunting alliances with yellow goatfish and bluefin trevally, flushing potential prey from narrow crannies in a reef the same way some moray eels do. Sea kraits are capable of diving up to 80 m deep in a single hunting trip. They also have a very large hunting range, with at least 615 and perhaps up to 1660 km^{2} surface area for the blue-lipped sea krait; 1380 and potentially up to 4500 km^{2} for the New Caledonian sea krait. They have a remarkable ability to climb up vertical rocks of their coastal limestone habitats.

== Breeding ==
Laticauda females are oviparous, and they return to land to mate and lay eggs. Several males form a mating ball around the female, twitching their bodies in what is termed "caudocephalic waves". Though these animals can occur in high densities in suitable locations, nests of eggs are very rarely encountered, suggesting specific nesting conditions need to be met.

== Species and taxonomy ==
Eight species are currently recognised as being valid.

- Laticauda colubrina (Schneider, 1799) – yellow-lipped sea krait
- Laticauda crockeri Slevin, 1934 – Crocker's sea snake
- Laticauda frontalis (De Vis, 1905)
- Laticauda guineai Heatwole, Busack & Cogger, 2005 – Guinea's sea krait
- Laticauda laticaudata (Linnaeus, 1758) – blue-lipped sea krait
- Laticauda saintgironsi Cogger & Heatwole, 2006 – New Caledonian sea krait
- Laticauda schistorhyncha (Günther, 1874) – katuali or Niue sea krait
- Laticauda semifasciata (Reinwardt in Schlegel, 1837) – black-banded sea krait

The species L. schistorhyncha and L. semifasciata have been placed in the genus Pseudolaticauda by some authors.

Nota bene: A binomial authority in parentheses indicates that the species was originally described in a genus other than Laticauda.

== Parasites ==
Sea snakes can have parasitic ticks, occasionally with heavy infestations.
