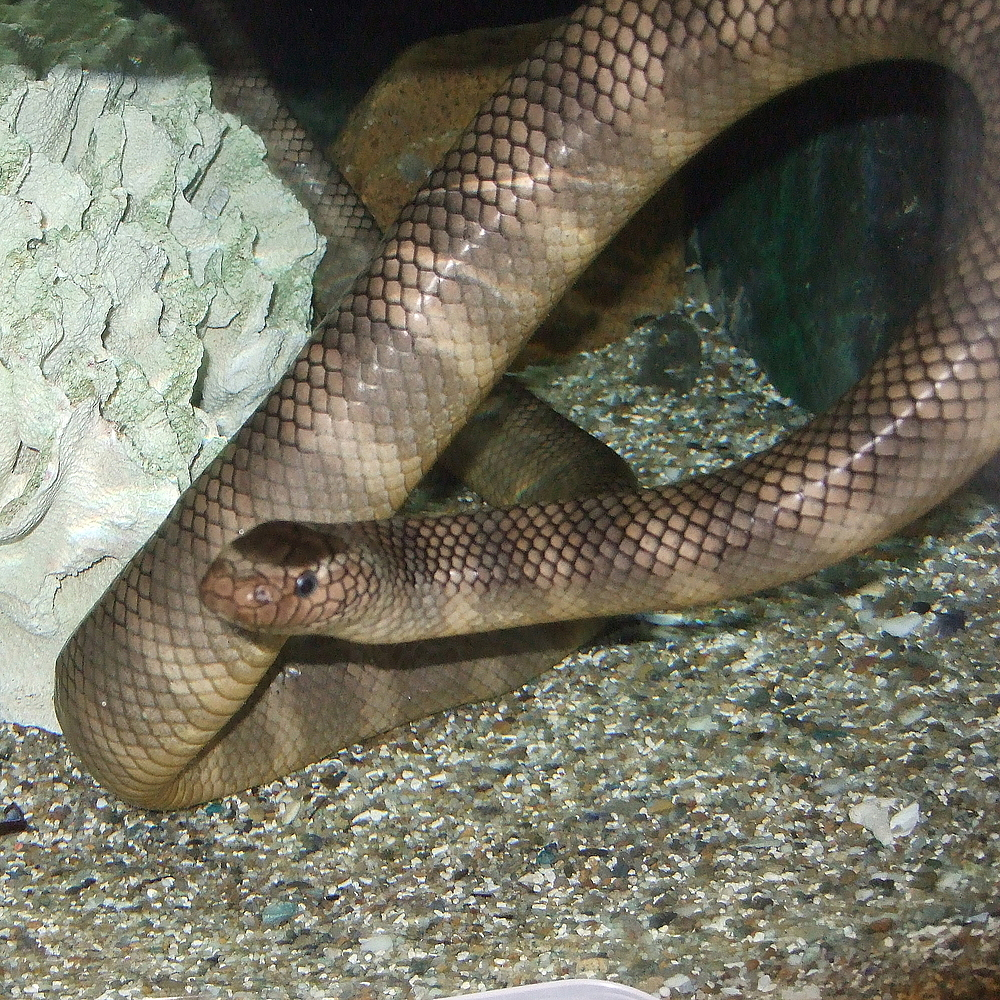

Conservation status
- Near Threatened (IUCN 3.1)

Scientific classification
- Kingdom: Animalia
- Phylum: Chordata
- Class: Reptilia
- Order: Squamata
- Suborder: Serpentes
- Family: Elapidae
- Genus: Laticauda
- Species: L. semifasciata

Binomial name
- Laticauda semifasciata (Reinwardt in Schlegel, 1837)

Synonyms
- Platurus semifasciatus Reinwardt in Schlegel, 1837; Platurus fasciatus var. semifasciatus — Fischer, 1856; Laticauda semifasciata — Stejneger, 1907; Pseudolaticauda semifasciata — Kharin, 2005; Laticauda semifasciata — Rasmussen et al., 2011

= Black-banded sea krait =

Species of snake

The black-banded sea krait (Laticauda semifasciata), also known commonly as the Chinese sea snake or erabu, is a largely amphibious species of extremely venomous marine reptile in the subfamily Laticaudinae, family Elapidae (cobras, mambas, coralsnakes and their kin). It is found in much of the western Pacific Ocean and some of the Sea of Japan. In Japan, it is known as erabu umi hebi (ja:エラブウミヘビ, 'erabu sea snake'); in Okinawa, it is known simply as irabu.

This sea krait frequents coral reef habitats, where it can explore tight spaces for prey, as it has a short head, thick trunk, and no easily discernible neck. The tail is simply extended skin, spread wide like a fin, and unsupported by any bony projections from the vertebral column. The stomach is comparatively wide. Massing together near the shore, it breeds between narrow cracks in the reef and in caves. It is a nocturnal snake, rarely seen during the day. It breathes air; so it breaks the surface at least once every six hours.

Too slow to pursue prey in open water, black-banded sea kraits hunt primarily by exploring the small spaces within coral reefs, in an effort to find hidden fish or other appropriately-sized animals. This meticulous scouring of the narrow nooks and crannies within a reef is similar to the hunting behaviors of some of the sea krait's main prey choices, such as the moray eel. Additionally, the black-banded sea krait has been observed foraging in mutually beneficial 'alliances' with bluefin trevally; the sea krait will scour the reef for potential prey as waiting groups of trevally watch, ready to pick-off any smaller, unwanted fish or crustaceans that are inadvertently flushed from the coral. Additionally, this group hunting behavior has been observed to occur with other black-banded sea kraits. The bite is highly venomous and paralyzes the prey. Females lay their eggs on land.

== Distribution ==
The black-banded sea krait can be found in the warm waters of the western Pacific Ocean. Its typical distribution range includes China, Indonesia, Japan, Philippines, and Taiwan. However, researchers have recently found L. semifasciata in the waters surrounding southern South Korea. Its dispersion northward from its typical distribution range is attributed to climate change which has caused deterioration of its habitat.

== Development ==
Males and females of the black-banded sea krait reach sexual maturity at snout-vent lengths of 70 and 80 cm (28 and 31 in), respectively. Females lay 3–7 eggs that hatch after 4–5 months. L. semifasciata can reach a total length (including tail) of 170 cm (67 in).

== Interaction with humans ==
Black-banded sea krait venom is reportedly ten times stronger than that of a cobra; however, as with the vast majority of venomous snake species, the black-banded sea krait generally does not aggressively strike at humans unless it is cornered or threatened (or otherwise maliciously provoked), preferring to conserve its energy and venom supplies for hunting purposes, reacting defensively only as a very last resort.

Despite its potent venom, which is concentrated in the snake's venom glands (behind the eyes), the meat of the erabu snake is a winter staple food in southern Japan, where it is believed to replenish a female's womanhood or increase fertility. Irabu soup, or irabu-jiru (ja:イラブー汁), is said to taste like miso and a bit like tuna. This dish was a favorite of the royal court of the Ryukyu Kingdom; it is thought to have analeptic properties.

During certain warm years, the sea snakes are drawn en masse to the sea caves and tide pools of the coastal Ryukyu cliffs, in search of fresh water to drink and possibly to mate. It is in these cryptic spots where, by cover of darkness (and usually guided only by lantern light), elderly women—who are the most experienced at preparing irabu-jiru—explore the dangerous caverns in pursuit of black-banded sea kraits, which the ladies catch with their bare hands. Some areas may contain hundreds of the snakes, some engaged in active breeding balls, yet the women hike through the caves barefoot or with minimal protective gear. As with the handling of any venomous snake species, the sea snakes are grabbed quickly behind the head, as to avoid any potential envenomation. They are placed in a cloth bag, alive, and later quickly dispatched and prepared in a simple broth with kombu or other edible kelp, and possibly a bit of pork.
