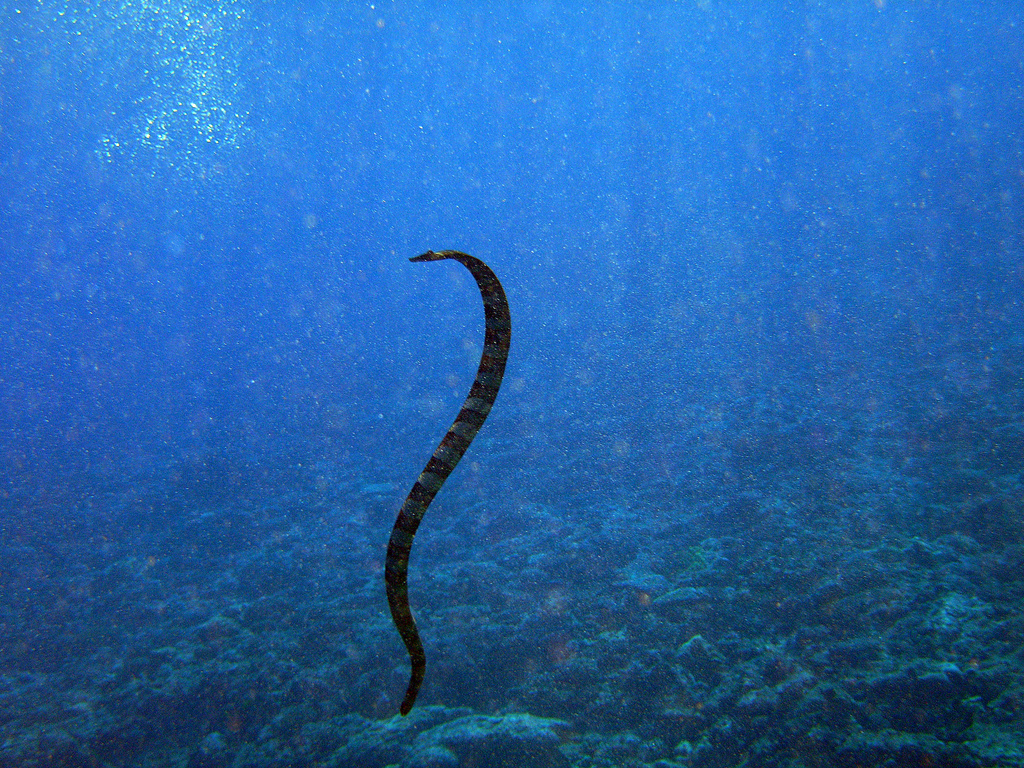
- Laticauda schystorhyncha in Niue

Conservation status
- Vulnerable (IUCN 3.1)

Scientific classification
- Kingdom: Animalia
- Phylum: Chordata
- Class: Reptilia
- Order: Squamata
- Suborder: Serpentes
- Family: Elapidae
- Genus: Laticauda
- Species: L. schistorhyncha

Binomial name
- Laticauda schistorhyncha (Günther, 1874)

Synonyms
- Platurus schistorhynchus Günther, 1874; Laticauda semifasciata schistorhynchus — Guinea, 1994; Laticauda schistorhyncha — Welch, 1994; Pseudolaticauda schistorhynchus — Kharin, 2005; Laticauda schistorhyncha — Heatwole et al., 2017

= Katuali =

Species of snake

The katuali or flat-tail sea snake (Laticauda schistorhyncha) is a species of venomous sea snake in the family Elapidae. The species is found only in the waters of the Pacific Islands nation of Niue.

== Description ==
L. schistorhyncha grows to a total length (including tail) of up to 1 m (3.3 ft), and is highly venomous, making it one of the most potentially dangerous creatures on the planet. It has a fin-like tail, helping it to swim better.

== Habitat ==
The katuali lives most of its adult life in the sea.

== Reproduction ==
During mating, the male katuali wraps itself around the female until she is fertilized. Because the eggs would not survive in water, the female swims into a sea cave to lay the eggs in dry crevices. These eggs take six months to hatch, and then the infant snakes make their way to the ocean.
