= Belfast Zoo =

Zoo in Belfast, Northern Ireland

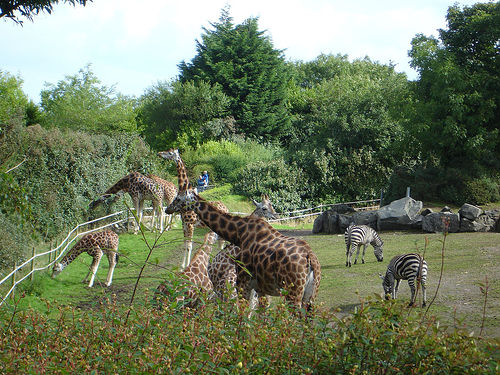
- Interactive map of Belfast Zoo
- 54.656°N 5.942°W
- Date opened: 28 March 1934
- Location: Belfast, Northern Ireland
- Land area: 55 acres (22 ha)
- No. of animals: 1200+
- No. of species: 120+
- Annual visitors: 300,000
- Memberships: BIAZA, EAZA, WAZA
- Major exhibits: Giant anteaters, Rainforest House and a large primate collection
- Website: www.belfastzoo.co.uk

Belfast Zoological Gardens (also known as Belfast Zoo) is a zoo in Belfast, Northern Ireland. It is in a relatively secluded location on the northeastern slope of Cavehill, overlooking Belfast's Antrim Road. Opened in 1934, it is the second-oldest zoo in Ireland, after Dublin Zoo, which opened in 1831.

Belfast Zoo is one of the top fee-paying visitor attractions in Northern Ireland, receiving more than 300,000 visitors a year. Located in north Belfast, the zoo's 55-acre (22 ha) site is home to more than 1,200 animals and 140 species.

The majority of the animals in Belfast Zoo are in danger in their natural habitat. The zoo carries out important conservation work and takes part in over 90 European and international breeding programmes which help to ensure the survival of many species under threat.

The zoo is a member of the British and Irish Association of Zoos and Aquariums (BIAZA), the European Association of Zoos and Aquaria (EAZA), and the World Association of Zoos and Aquariums (WAZA).

== History ==
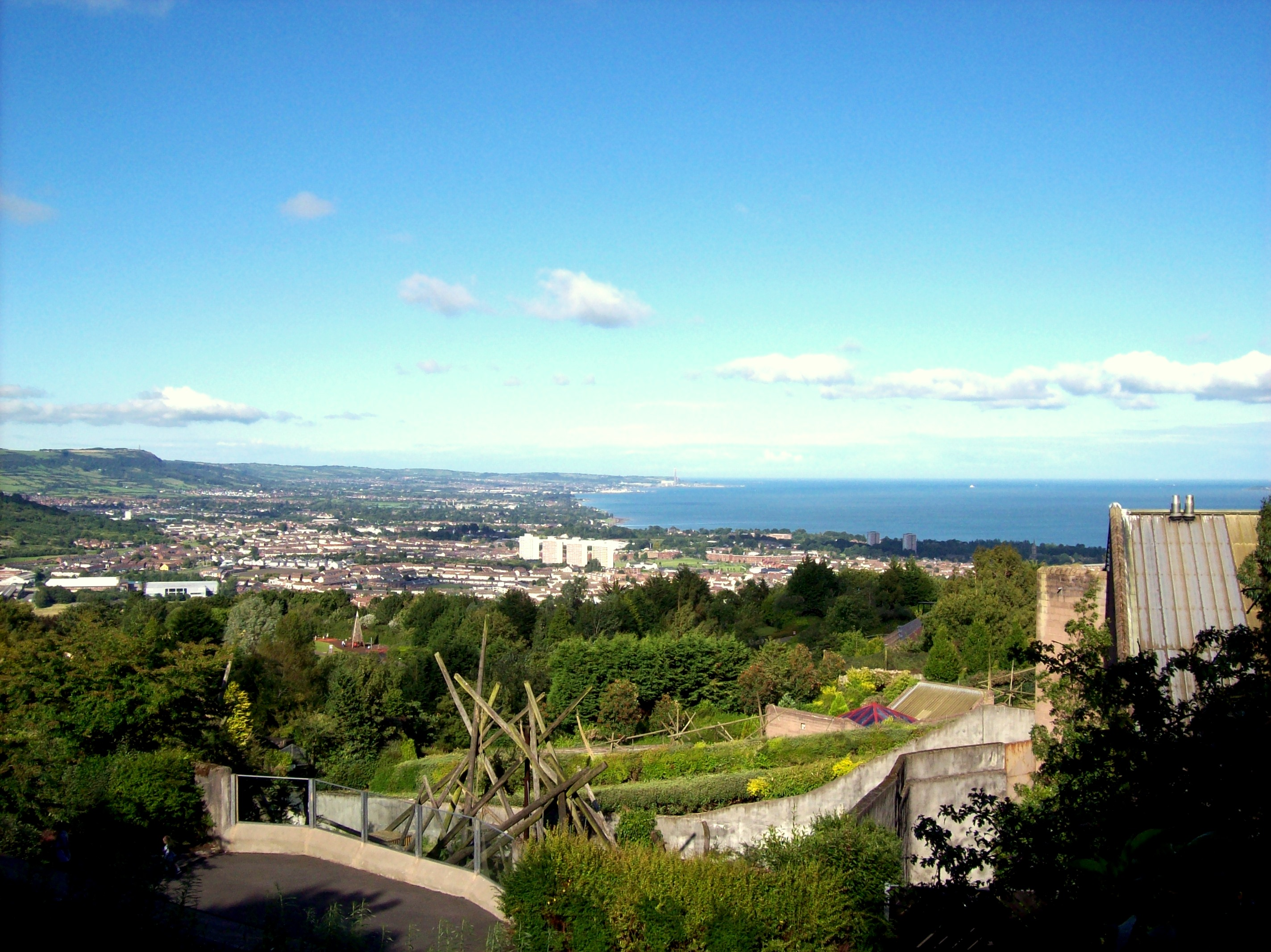
The view east from inside Belfast Zoo, showing its location on the slopes of Cavehill

The story of Belfast Zoo begins with the city's public transport system. At the beginning of the 20th century, passengers from Belfast were transported to the villages of Whitewell and Glengormley by horse-drawn trams belonging to the Belfast Street Tramway company and steam tramways from Cavehill and Whitewell.

In 1911, the tram line was taken over by Belfast Corporation, now Belfast City Council. The corporation decided to build a miniature railway, playground, and pleasure gardens. The area was named Bellevue, meaning 'good or pretty view'.

During the 1920s and 1930s, the gardens were a popular destination for day trips. In 1933, the corporation decided to install a representative zoological collection on the site. Then, in 1934, 12 acres (4.9 ha) on either side of the Grand Floral Staircase, a series of steps designed to reach the top of the hillside, were laid out as Bellevue Zoo.

It took 150 men to build the site and the steps can still be seen from Antrim Road today. The zoo was opened on 28 March 1934 by Sir Crawford McCullagh, the then Lord Mayor of Belfast. The venture was supported by Councillor RJR Harcourt from Belfast Corporation and was partnered by George Chapman, an animal dealer and circus entrepreneur.

It cost £10,000 (approximately £700,000 in today's money) to build and a total of 284,713 people visited the zoo in its first year.

== Management ==
Belfast Zoo is owned by Belfast City Council. The council spends over £2.5 million every year on running and promoting the zoo, which is one of the few local government-funded zoos in the UK and Ireland.

The zoo's work is overseen by the council's Parks and Leisure Committee. The committee is made up of 20 locally elected councillors.

== Collections ==
The zoo is home to over 120 species:

=== Primates ===
- Western lowland gorilla
- Pygmy marmoset
- White-belted ruffed lemur
- Red-bellied lemur
- Ring-tailed lemur
- Crowned lemur
- Red titi monkey
- Black and white colobus
- Pied tamarin
- Moloch gibbon
- Golden lion tamarin
- Francois langur
- Emperor tamarin
- Colombian spider monkey
- Common chimpanzee
- Cotton-top tamarin

=== Other mammals ===
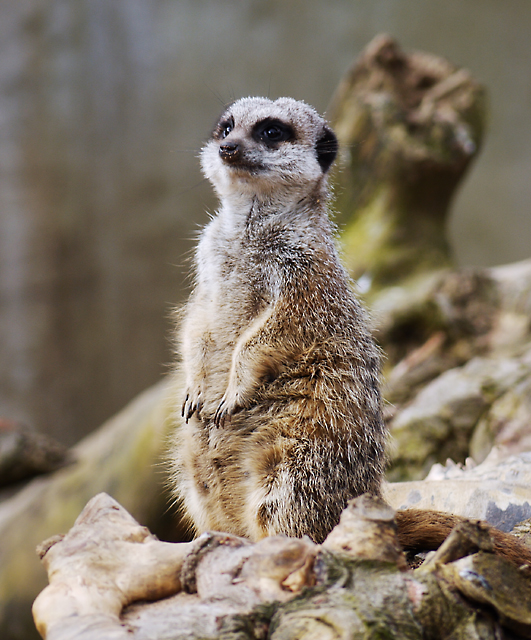
Meerkat, Belfast Zoo

- Bush dog
- Spectacled bear
- Californian sea lion
- Visayan warty pig
- Giant anteater
- Blesbok
- Spot-necked otter
- Rodrigues fruit bat
- Nepalese red panda
- Maned wolf
- Vicuña
- Lion
- Rothschild's giraffe
- Eastern bongo
- Grant's zebra
- Goodfellow's tree-kangaroo
- Cape porcupine
- Meerkat
- Capybara
- Red squirrel
- Southern pudu
- Northeast African cheetah

=== Birds ===
- Citron-crested cockatoo
- Red-tailed black cockatoo
- Palm cockatoo
- Bali starling
- Von der Decken's hornbill
- White-tailed sea eagle
- Barn owl
- Chilean flamingo
- Indian peafowl
- Nicobar pigeon
- White-crested turaco
- Gentoo penguin
- Rockhopper penguin
- Sunbittern
- Ostrich
- Darwin's rhea
- Tawny frogmouth
- Coscoroba swan
- Southern crowned pigeon
- Southern screamer
- Laughing kookaburra
- Pied imperial pigeon

=== Reptiles ===
- Beaded lizard
- Royal python
- Mediterranean tortoise
- Red-footed tortoise
- Cuban tree boa
- Box turtle
- Jamaican boa
- Madagascar tree boa
- Mangrove snake
- Pancake tortoise
- Turquoise dwarf gecko
- Utila iguana
- Bearded dragon

=== Domestic animals ===
The zoo also has a farm which houses domestic animals such as pygmy goats, Shetland ponies, miniature donkeys, rabbits, and Norfolk Grey chickens.

== Developments ==
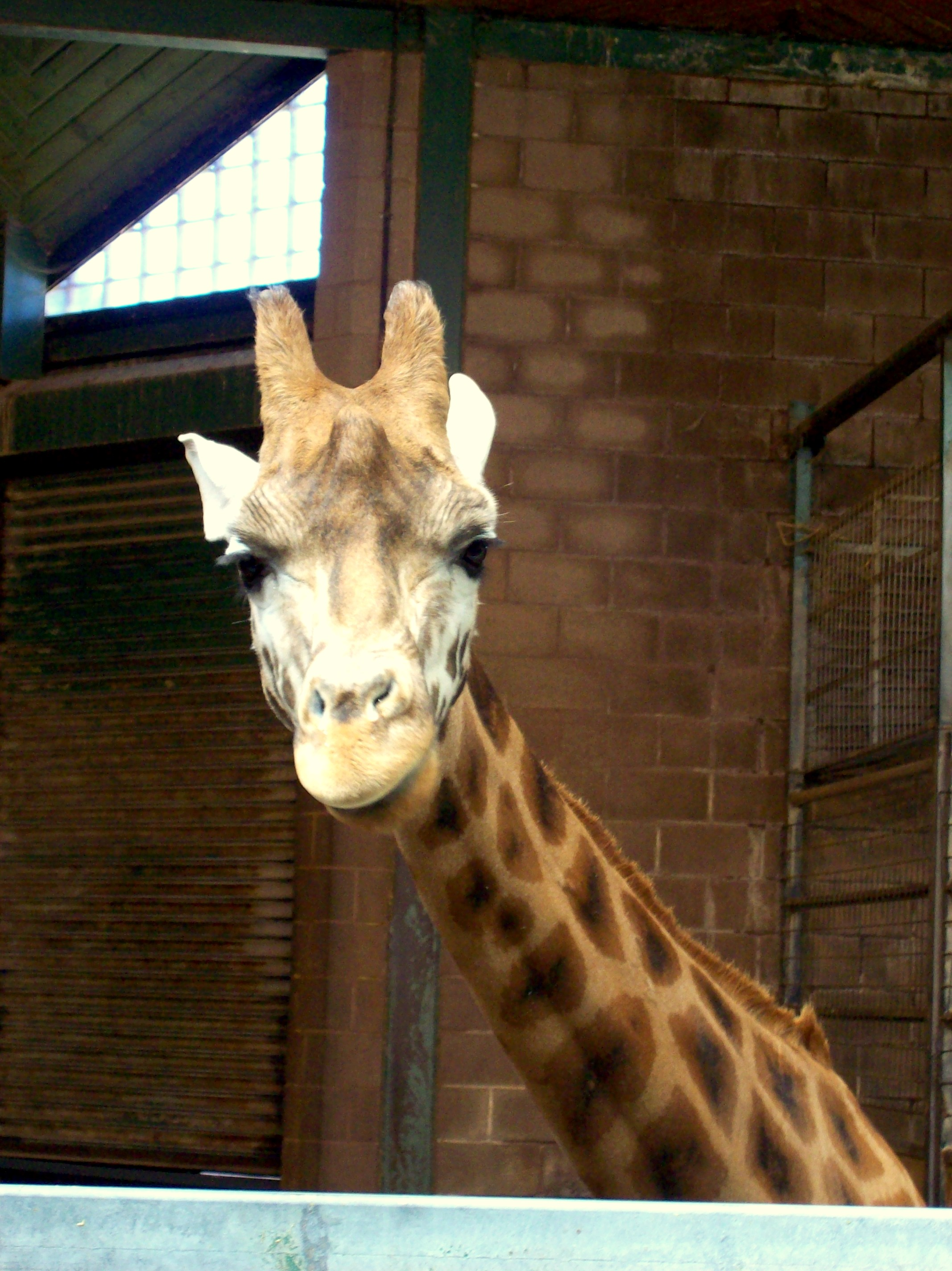
A giraffe in the shared indoor giraffe and elephant house

Belfast Zoo is always making changes and welcoming new arrivals or celebrating births. In June 2007, a Barbary lion cub was born at the zoo. This was the first Barbary lion to be born in Ireland. The cub was rejected by its mother and hand-reared at home by keeper Linda Frew. Lily the lion moved to Hodonín Zoo in the Czech Republic in August 2009, as part of a breeding programme.

In 2008, the zoo opened a new tropical rainforest which houses such animals as two-toed sloth, red-footed tortoises and Rodrigues bats. The Rainforest House is a walk-through exhibition with tropical landscaping and a constant temperature of 27 degrees.

More recently, renovations have included work on the gorilla and chimpanzee enclosures, giraffe and elephant enclosures, including a raised giraffe feeder, and new frames in the spider monkey and Andean bear enclosures.

In 2009, on its 75th birthday, the zoo opened a new state-of-the-art Visitors' Centre and "Zoovenir" Shop. The refurbishment features high-level roofing with plenty of natural light and multimedia presentations showing the history of Belfast Zoo and wildlife in Northern Ireland.

The zoo was awarded £250,000 from the Tourism Development Scheme (TDS) from the Northern Ireland Tourist Board to build the new reception area. The council has donated a further £300,000 to help with the increase in visitor numbers.

2009 was a successful year with plenty of new arrivals including a Sumatran tiger called Kabus, and the only tree-kangaroo in the UK, called Kwikila. 2009 also brought the zoo's highest level of visitors in its history with over 302,000 visitors. Over 90 babies were born in the zoo in 2009.

2010 saw the arrival of two smooth-coated otters, coppery titi monkeys and a pair of toco toucans. Other new arrivals that year included a female Sumatran tiger to join Kabus. May Day in 2010 had more than double the visitors of the same day in 2009.

Babies since 2009 have included a Malayan tapir, ring-tailed lemurs, a Grant's zebra, California sea lions, black-tailed prairie dogs, litters of piglets, spider monkeys, red kangaroos and many more.

2012 saw the birth of two eastern bongos, a blesbok foal, a giraffe foal and a baby chimpanzee and 2013 has seen the birth of coppery titi monkeys, a two toed sloth, another chimpanzee, twin white-belted ruffed lemurs as well as the arrival of two goodfellow's tree-kangaroos. Belfast zoo is only one of 22 worldwide zoos to hold the Goodfellow's tree-kangaroo.

== Incidents ==
In 2001, a wolf-like dog broke into the kangaroo enclosure and killed one of the younger kangaroos that had been born at the zoo. The same year, vandals broke into the zoo and attacked several penguins in their enclosure with an iron bar. One was thrown into the lion's den and killed.

In 2010, a female white-nosed coati escaped and was not found for more than five weeks.

In 2013, and again in 2015, several macaques escaped. They were found several days later.

In 2018, a spider monkey escaped and died after being hit by a car on the nearby motorway.

In 2019, a red panda escaped due to a power fault in her enclosure. She was found the next day in a residential area, a mile away from the zoo. That same year, chimpanzees at the zoo used a branch as a ladder to briefly escape their enclosure.

In 2023, politicians expressed concerns after a Freedom of Information request found that 84 animals had died at the zoo in the past three years.

In 2024, whistleblowers came forward to expose multiple recent incidents at the zoo. A male alpaca had euthanised after a fight with two other male alpacas; his leg had been broken and another alpaca's jaw was broken. The whistleblower stated that male alpacas should not have been kept together in the same pen. A new male capybara was bitten and drowned by another capybara when introduced to a new colony with 'insufficient supervision'. An 'unknown predator' had been hunting and killing the flamingos at night for weeks. They also stated that a troop of colobus monkeys had broken loose from their enclosure and that it had been kept secret; the zoo confirmed that “a small number of baby colobus monkeys and their mothers briefly left their enclosure” in July but that the animals did not get beyond “the perimeter of their wider habitat” and were returned.

That same year, an employee at the zoo was allegedly locked in the lion enclosure.

In 2026, a Freedom of Information request found that the number of animal deaths at the zoo had risen 40% in the past two years.

== Floral Hall ==
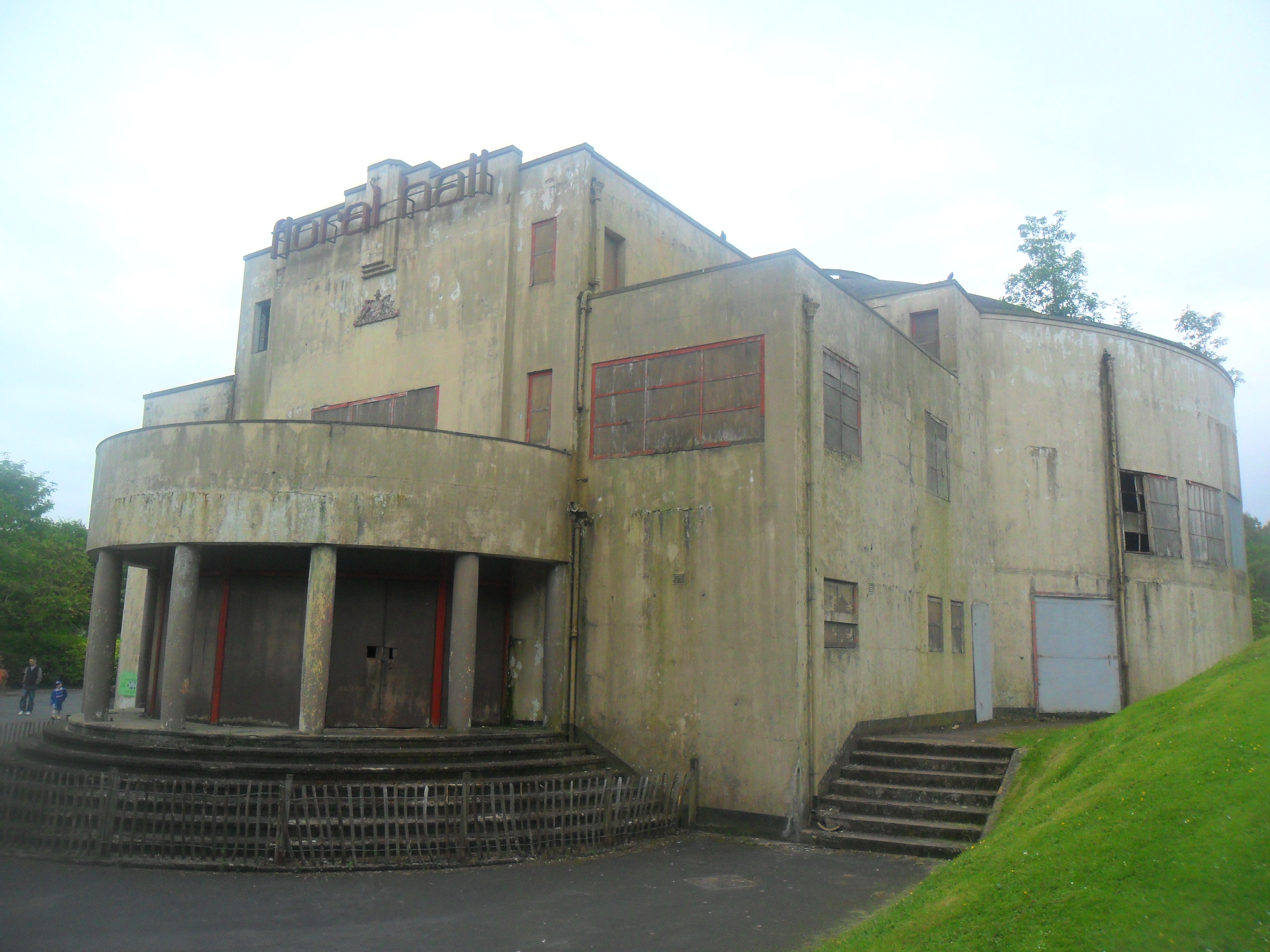
The Floral Hall

Located within the grounds of the zoo is a 1930s art deco ballroom, the Floral Hall. The hall was popular dance venue. During World War II, it had blackouts fitted to the windows so that dances could continue. In the 1960s, the hall was visited by musicians such as Pink Floyd and Small Faces. The Floral Hall closed to the public on 2 April 1972 and has fallen into dereliction since then. During the 1990s, it was given the Listed Building status.

Belfast Buildings Preservation Trust plans to renovate the building, although Belfast City Council has yet to provide funding.

In 2010, meetings were held to discuss potential uses for the hall and the carrying out of a feasibility study. In December 2011, a social media account was created to share old photos of the hall and contemporary photos of its interior. In 2012, an online petition addressed to Belfast City Council was created to request progress with the restoration project. In March 2018, Liverpool based developer Signature Living submitted a £5 million proposal to revive the hall. Lawrence Kenwright, owner of Signature Living, said he hoped to restore the hall for use as a "leading entertainment, conference and wedding venue".
