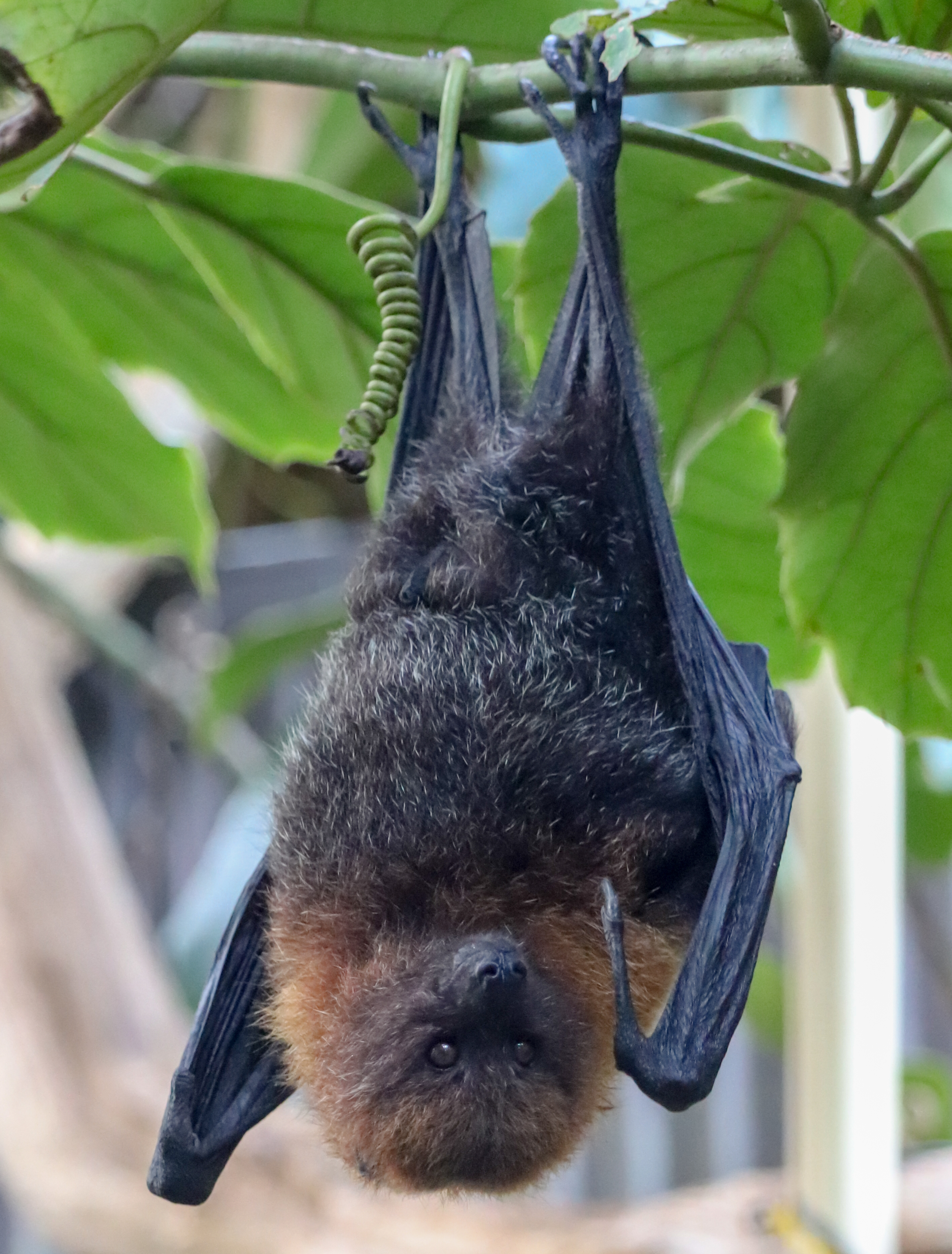
- A Rodrigues flying fox (Pteropus rodricensis) at Cotswold Wildlife Park

Conservation status
- Endangered (IUCN 3.1)

Scientific classification
- Kingdom: Animalia
- Phylum: Chordata
- Class: Mammalia
- Infraclass: Placentalia
- Order: Chiroptera
- Family: Pteropodidae
- Genus: Pteropus
- Species: P. rodricensis

Binomial name
- Pteropus rodricensis Dobson, 1878
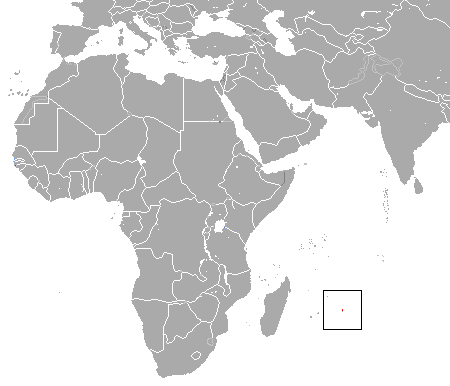
- Rodrigues flying fox range

Synonyms
- Pteropus mascarinus

= Rodrigues flying fox =

Large species of bat native to the island of Rodrigues

The Rodrigues flying fox or Rodrigues fruit bat (Pteropus rodricensis) is a species of bat in the family Pteropodidae, the flying foxes or fruit bats. It is endemic to Rodrigues, an island in the Indian Ocean belonging to Mauritius. Its natural habitat is tropical lowland forests. The bats are sociable, roost in large groups during the day and feed at night, squeezing the juice and flesh out of fruits. They are hunted by humans for food and their numbers have been dwindling, and the International Union for Conservation of Nature has rated the species as endangered. In an effort to preserve them from extinction, some bats have been caught and are being bred in various zoos around the world.

== Ecology ==
It is a sociable species which lives in large groups. It can reach 350 g (12 oz) in weight and has a wingspan of 90 cm (35 in). At night, the bats forage in dry woodland for fruit of various trees, such as tamarinds, rose-apples, mangoes, palms, and figs. Like many other fruit bats, they squeeze out the juices and soft pulp, rarely swallowing the harder parts. Observations in captivity show each dominant male gathers a harem of up to ten females to roost and mate with. Subordinate and immature males tend to roost in another part of the camp.

== Status ==
The Rodrigues flying fox is threatened by habitat loss through storm damage and human intervention, and by local hunting for food. Formerly, the daytime roosts or 'camps' of this flying fox often contained more than 500 individuals. The species currently numbers around 20,000 specimens in total according to IUCN, and the bat is classified as endangered by the IUCN. The Durrell Wildlife Conservation Trust has undertaken a successful captive breeding program, and there are now colonies in several zoos. Due to its imperiled status, it is identified by the Alliance for Zero Extinction as a species in danger of imminent extinction. In 2013, Bat Conservation International listed the Rodrigues flying fox as one of the 35 species of its worldwide priority list of conservation. In 2017, the IUCN determined that this species now has an increasing population trend, so conservation efforts may prove successful for this species.

== Zoos ==
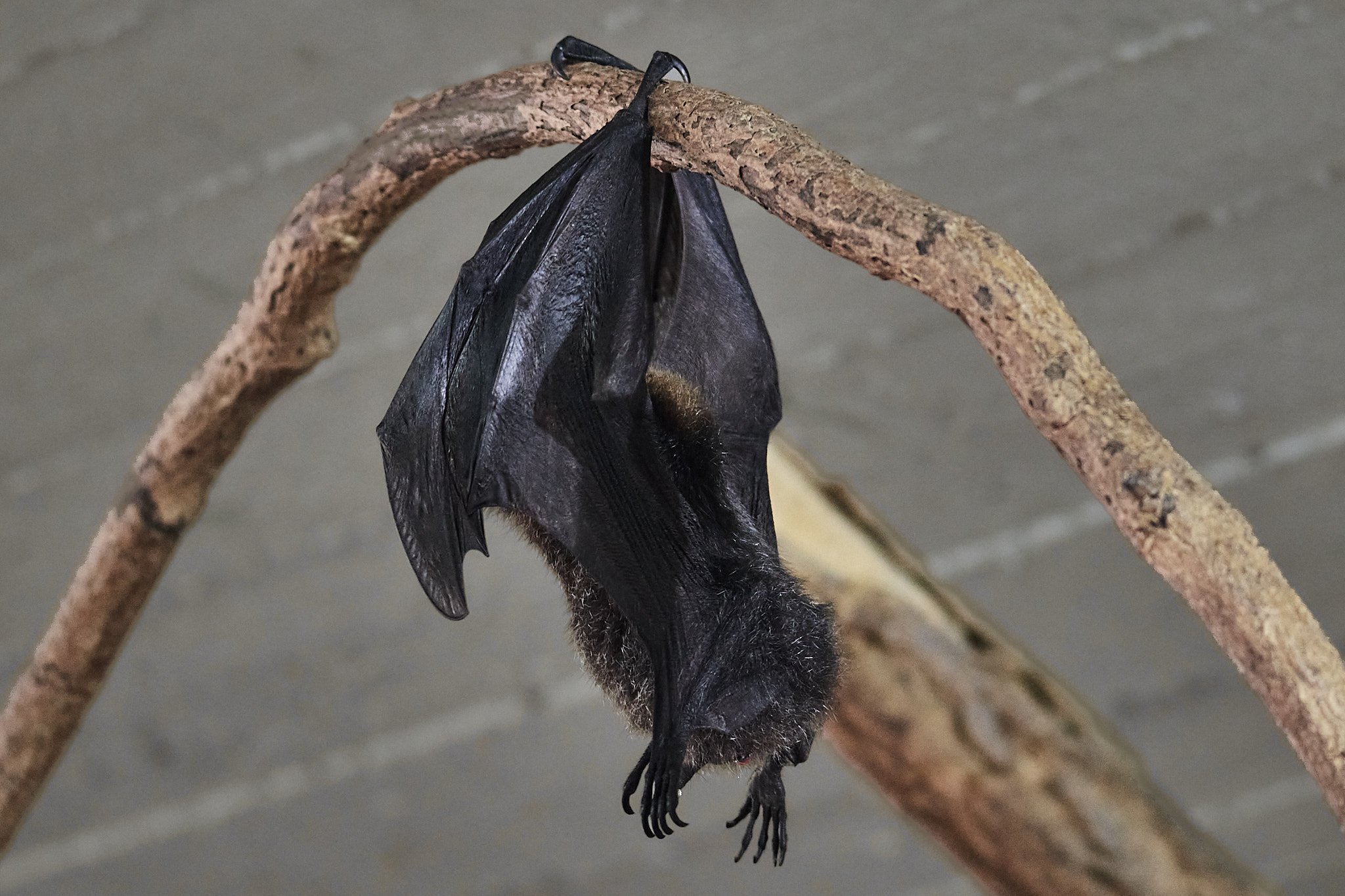
Rodrigues flying fox in Prague Zoo

Colonies are kept in the Durrell Wildlife Conservation Trust, West Midlands Safari Park, the Philadelphia Zoo, the Central Park Zoo, the Brookfield Zoo, the Bronx Zoo, the Oregon Zoo, the Moody Gardens Rainforest Pyramid, the San Diego Zoo Safari Park, Disney's Animal Kingdom, the Copenhagen Zoo, the Belfast Zoo, Curraghs Wildlife Park, Folly Farm Zoo, Dublin Zoo, Paignton Zoo, Royal Burgers' Zoo, Prague Zoo amongst others. The largest captive group is at Chester Zoo.
