= Myron karnsi =

Scientific classification
- Kingdom: Animalia
- Phylum: Chordata
- Class: Reptilia
- Order: Squamata
- Suborder: Serpentes
- Family: Homalopsidae
- Genus: Myron
- Species: M. karnsi

Binomial name
- Myron karnsi Murphy, 2011

Species of Australian snake

Myron karnsi, also known as the Aru mangrove snake or Karns' mangrove snake, is a species of venomous homalopsid snake native to the Aru Islands of Indonesia. The specific epithet karnsi honours herpetologist Daryl Karns of the Field Museum of Natural History.

== Description ==
This is a melanistic species.

== Distribution and habitat ==
The species is known only from the Aru Islands of the Arafura Sea, lying between southern New Guinea and northern Australia.
