= Myron resetari =

Scientific classification
- Kingdom: Animalia
- Phylum: Chordata
- Class: Reptilia
- Order: Squamata
- Suborder: Serpentes
- Family: Homalopsidae
- Genus: Myron
- Species: M. resetari

Binomial name
- Myron resetari Murphy, 2011

Species of Australian snake

Myron resetari, also known as the Broome mangrove snake or Resetar's mangrove snake, is a species of venomous homalopsid snake native to the marine waters of north-western Australia. The specific epithet resetari honours herpetologist Alan Resetar of the Field Museum of Natural History.

== Description ==
The snake grows to an average of about 40 cm in length.

== Behaviour ==
The species is viviparous.

== Distribution and habitat ==
The species is known only from the type locality of Broome, in tropical north-western Western Australia, where it inhabits mangrove-lined coastal waters.
