= Myron richardsonii =

Scientific classification
- Kingdom: Animalia
- Phylum: Chordata
- Class: Reptilia
- Order: Squamata
- Suborder: Serpentes
- Family: Homalopsidae
- Genus: Myron
- Species: M. richardsonii

Binomial name
- Myron richardsonii Gray, 1849

Synonyms
- Neospades kentii De Vis, 1889

Species of Australian snake

Myron richardsonii, also known as Richardson's mangrove snake, is a species of venomous homalopsid snake native to the marine waters of eastern Indonesia and northern Australia. The specific epithet richardsonii honours Sir John Richardson, collector of the original specimen.

== Description ==
The snake grows to an average of about 40 cm in length, and to a maximum of 60 cm.

== Behaviour ==
The species is viviparous, with an average litter size of six. It feeds on fishes.

== Distribution and habitat ==
The species’ distribution encompasses the coasts around the Arafura Sea, including the Aru Islands and southern New Guinea as well as northern Australia from the Kimberley eastwards to the Gulf of Carpentaria. Habitat includes coasts, estuaries and tidal rivers.
