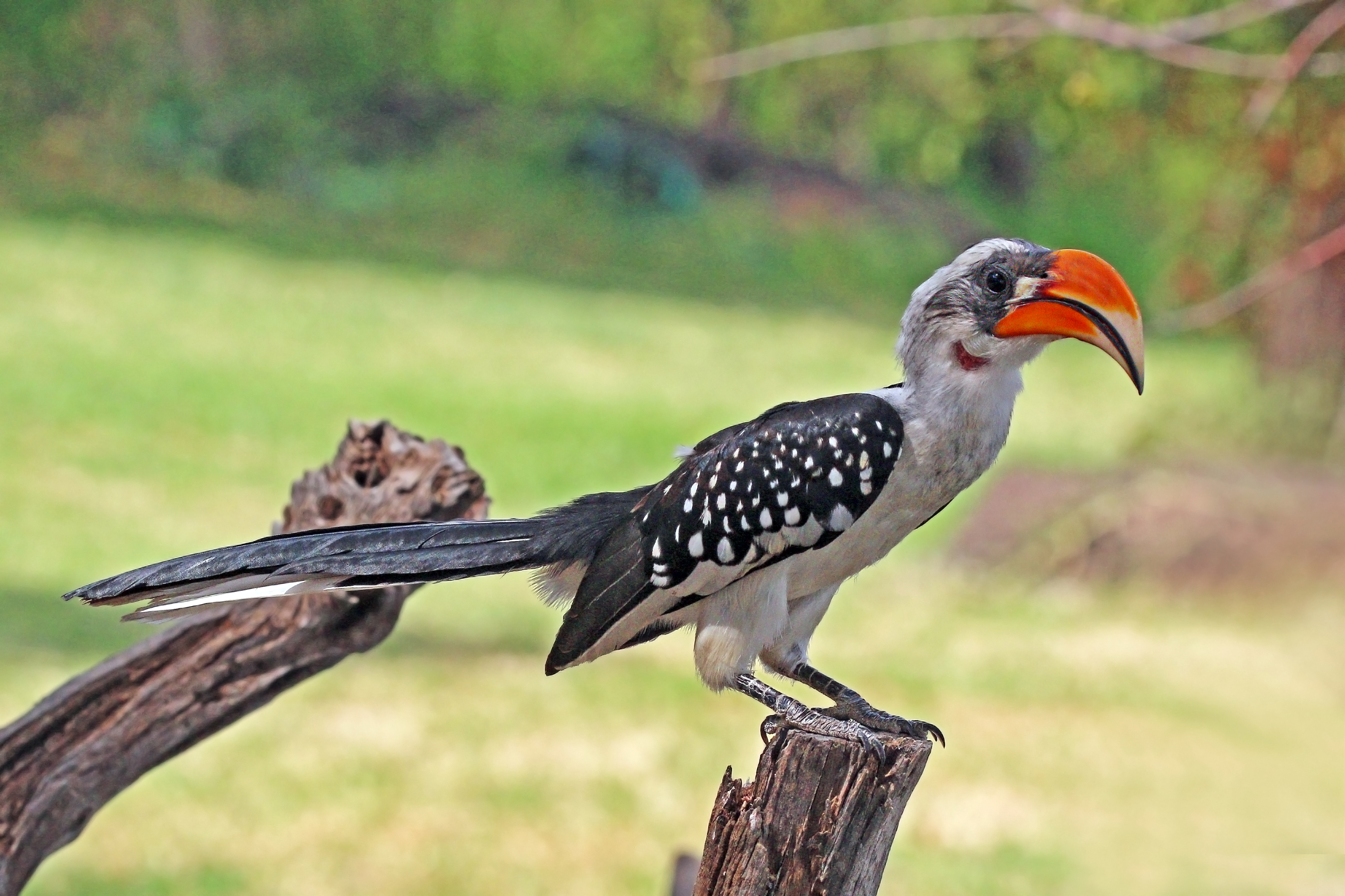
- male
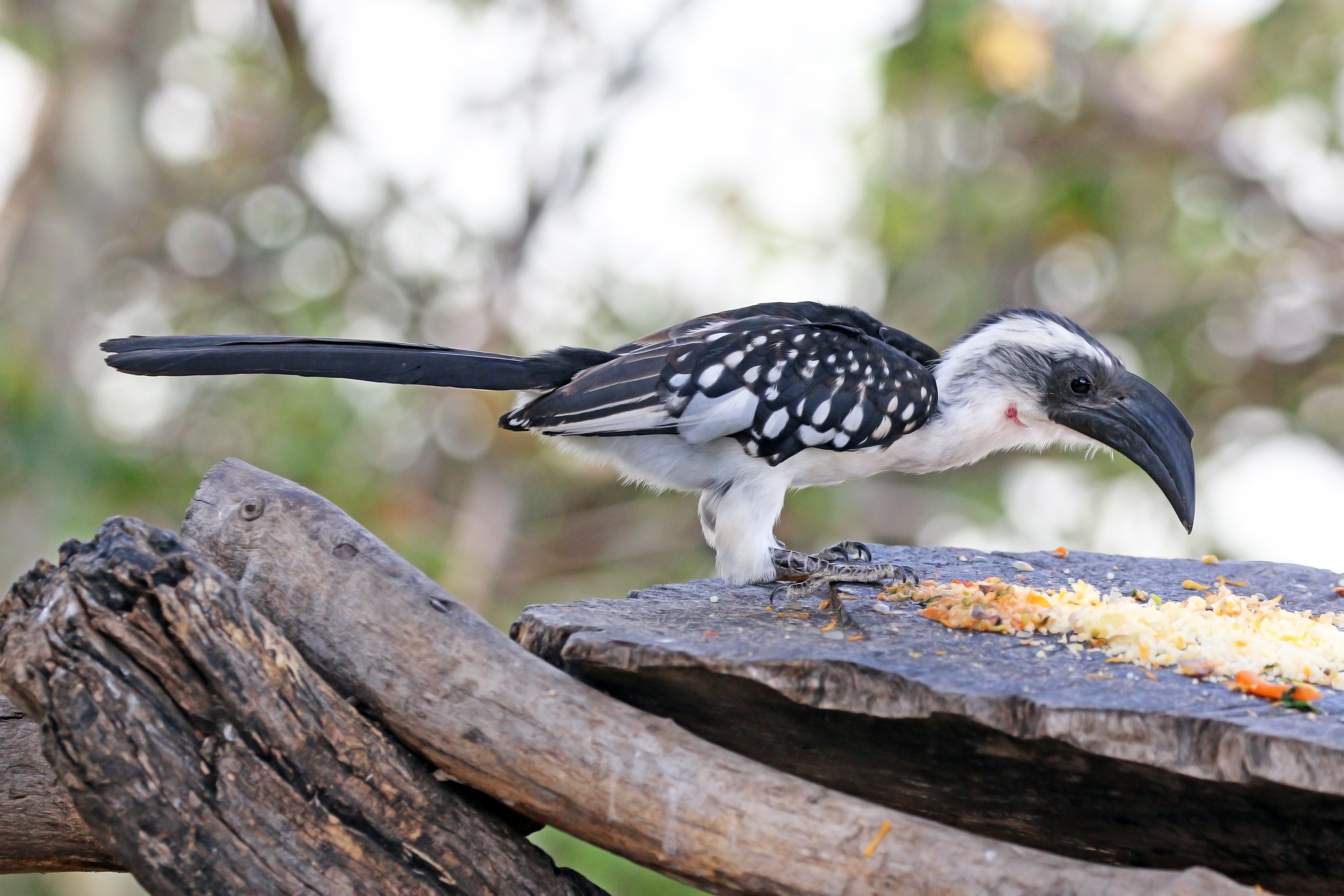
- female both at Lake Baringo, Kenya

Conservation status
- Least Concern (IUCN 3.1)

Scientific classification
- Kingdom: Animalia
- Phylum: Chordata
- Class: Aves
- Order: Bucerotiformes
- Family: Bucerotidae
- Genus: Tockus
- Species: T. jacksoni

Binomial name
- Tockus jacksoni (Ogilvie-Grant, 1891)

Synonyms
- Tockus deckeni jacksoni

= Jackson's hornbill =

Species of bird

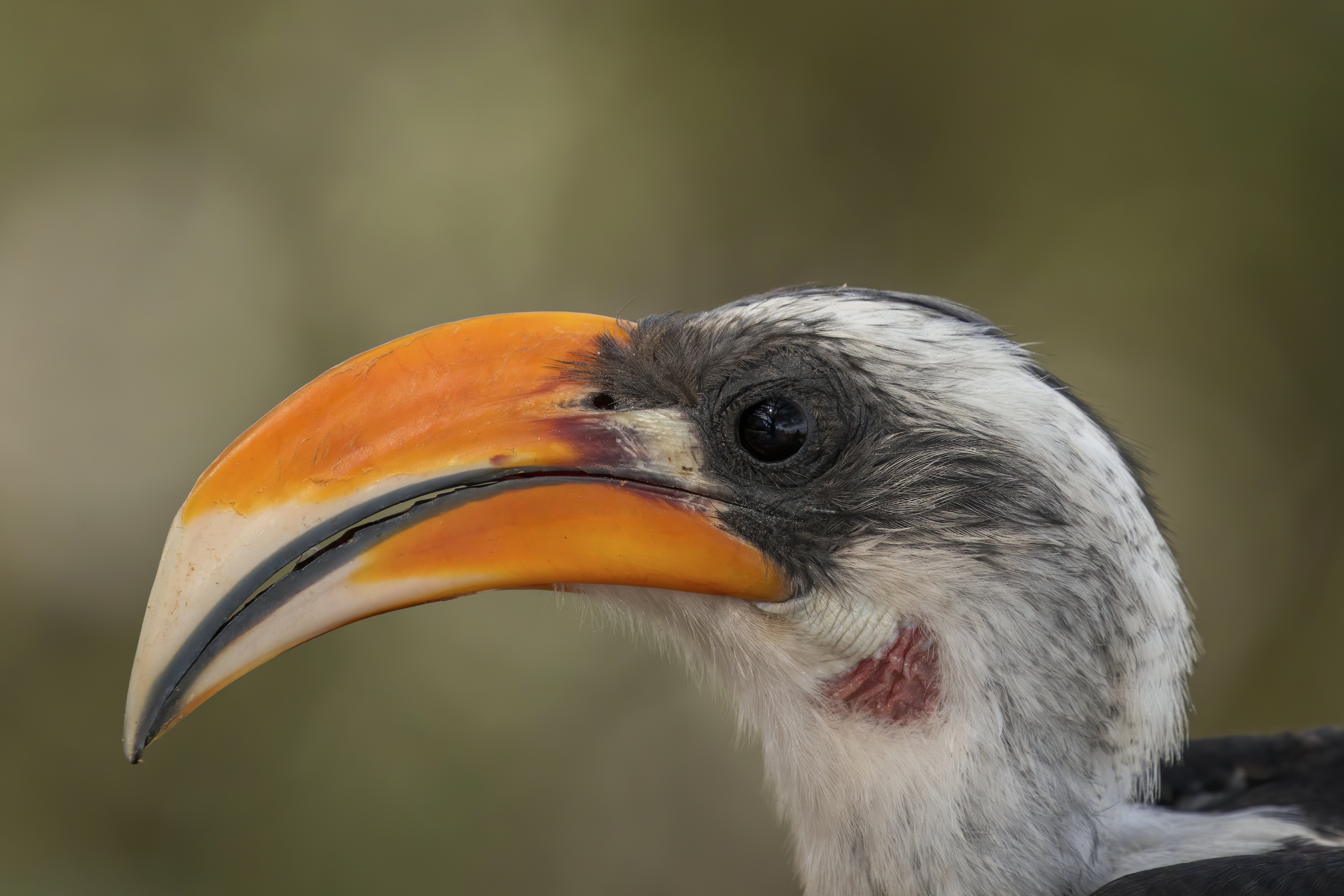
Male, Lake Baringo, Kenya

Jackson's hornbill (Tockus jacksoni) is a species of hornbill in the family Bucerotidae. It is only found in North West Kenya and North East Uganda. Except for the dense white spots on the wing-coverts, it resembles, and is often considered a subspecies of, Von der Decken's hornbill.
