= Folly Farm Adventure Park and Zoo =

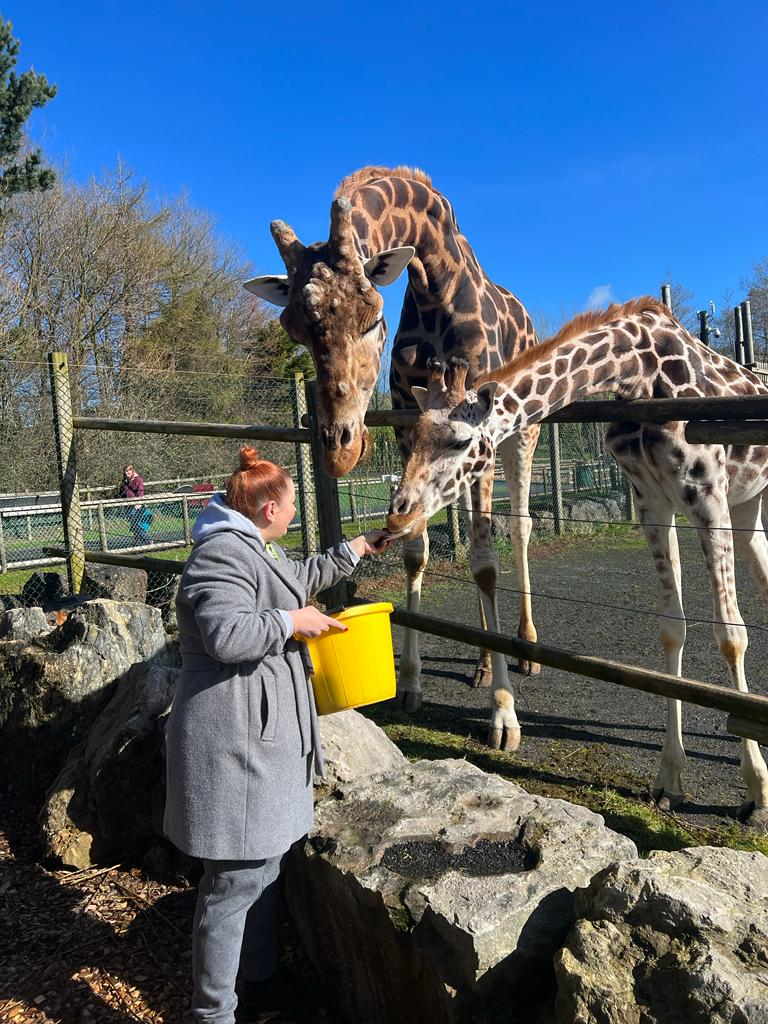
- Giraffe Feeding at Folly Farm
- Interactive map of Folly Farm Adventure Park and Zoo
- 51.74382150°N 4.73283290°W
- Slogan: Everyone in the family likes to do different things, pick your own adventure at Folly Farm - Zoo, Farm, Play and Fairground
- Date opened: 17 July 1988
- Location: Pembrokeshire, Wales
- Land area: 120 acres
- No. of animals: 750+
- No. of species: 100+
- Annual visitors: 500,000
- Memberships: BIAZA (British & Irish Association of Zoos and Aquaria)
- Major exhibits: Pride of Pembrokeshire, Penguin Coast, Kifaru Reserve, Asian Adventure
- Owner: Anne Williams, Karina Ebsworth and Chris Ebsworth
- Website: www.folly-farm.co.uk

Folly Farm Adventure Park and Zoo (also known as Folly Farm), situated to the north of Saundersfoot and Tenby in Pembrokeshire, is a visitor attraction in Wales with around 500,000 visits each year. Initially a farm attraction, the park is now also home to an indoor vintage funfair, a zoo with over 200 different species of animal and extensive indoor and outdoor adventure play areas.

The original farm has expanded and now covers a significant part of the park including a large undercover Jolly Barn area featuring horses, goats, sheep, pigs and smaller petting animals. Folly Farm is made up of four areas, including a farmyard, a zoo, and an undercover vintage funfair with a Wurlitzer organ. The park has expanded to the other side of the A478 road, where more animals can be found in outdoor paddocks. A tractor-driven land-train ride, touring the outdoor paddocks, operates between late morning and mid-afternoon.

A limited company, Folly Farm is owned and operated by the Williams and Ebsworth families and holds Investors in People status with 90 full-time employees and 100 seasonal members of staff.

== History ==
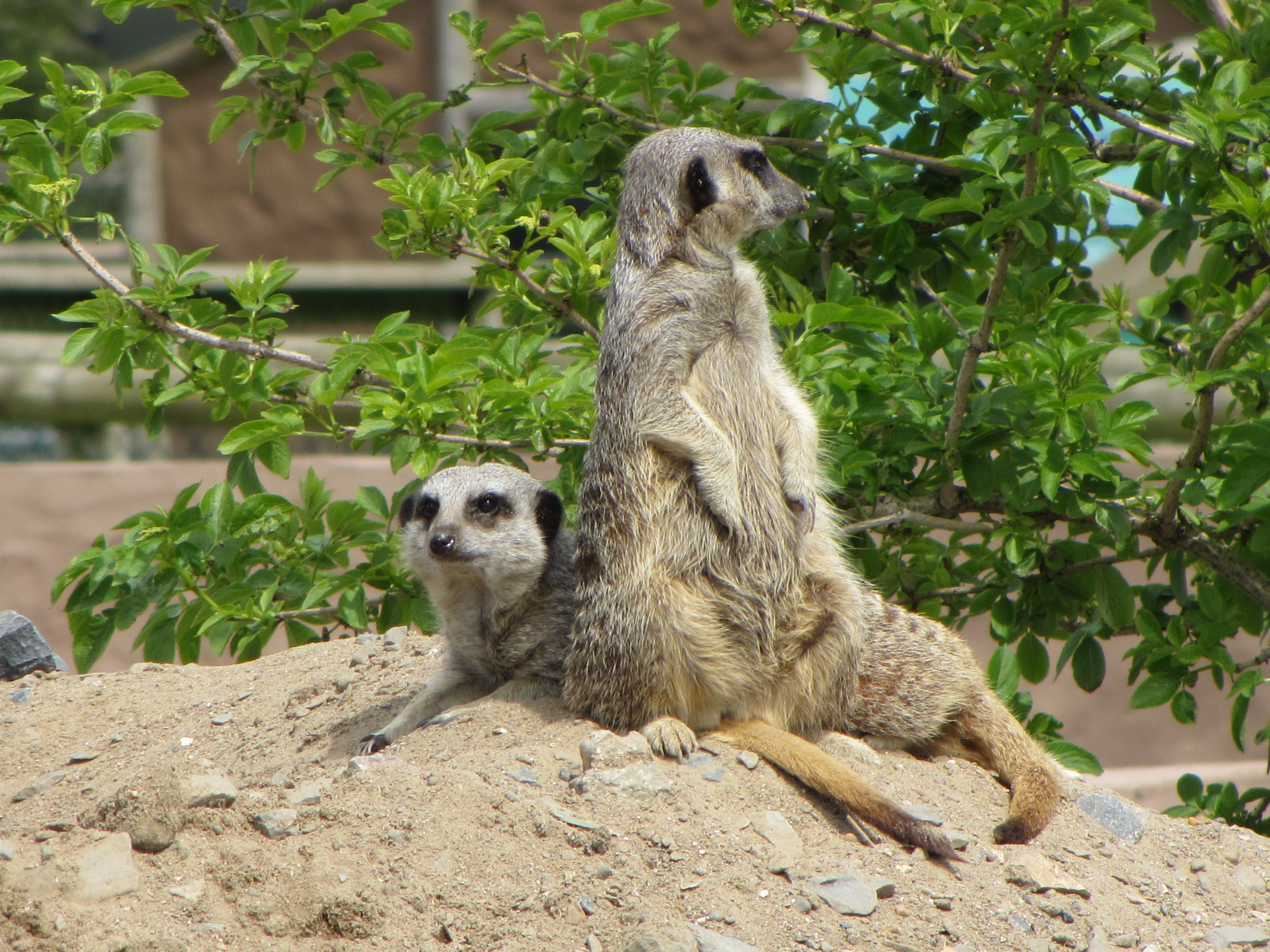
Meerkats

Folly Farm started as a dairy farm. After noticing families were stopping by the roadside to pet and watch their cattle, the farmer Glyndŵr Williams and his wife Anne decided to diversify into tourism. In 1988, the dairy farm was converted to receive visitors; now guests could stop to visit the Folly Farm cows and see them being milked. Over the last 25 years Folly Farm has grown with continued reinvestment. The first zoo animals arrived at the park in 2002.

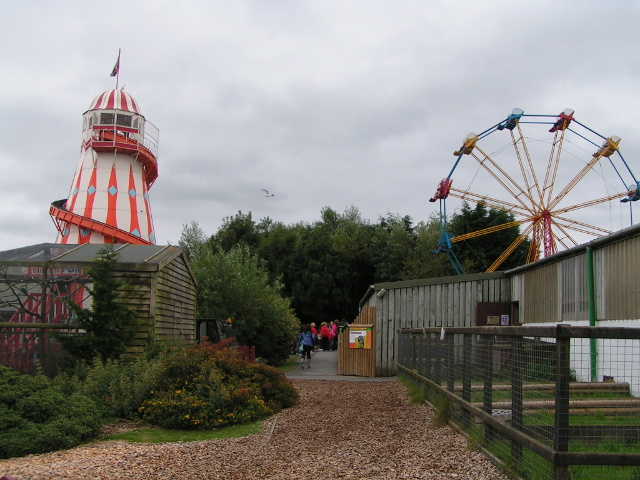
Funfair helter-skelter and big wheel

Winner of the Wales Tourist Board's 2005 Best Day Out in Wales award, and again in 2010, and in 2015. In 2009, winner of Pembrokeshire Tourism's Best Family Day Out award. Folly Farm was named 10th best zoo in the world in the 2017 Tripadvisor Travellers' Choice Awards.

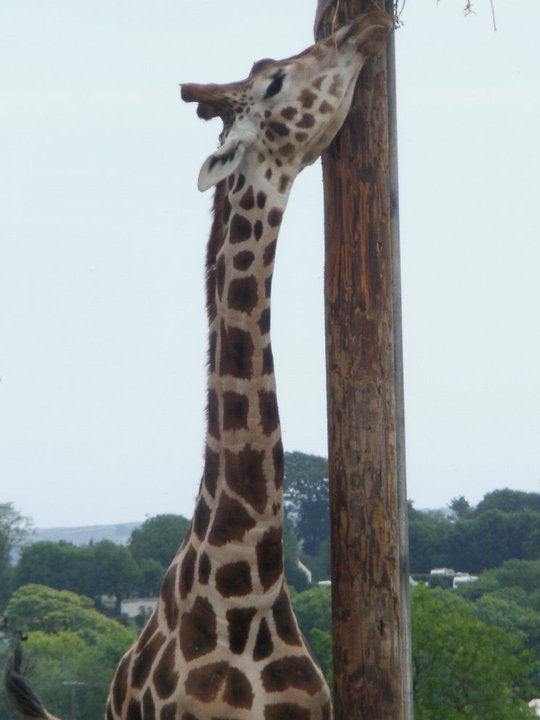
Folly Farm's giraffe

The founder Glyndŵr Williams was born in 1944 in Haverfordwest and his parents George and Margaret moved to Folly Farm when he was two years of age. He died on 18 February 2020 following a long illness.

== Animals ==
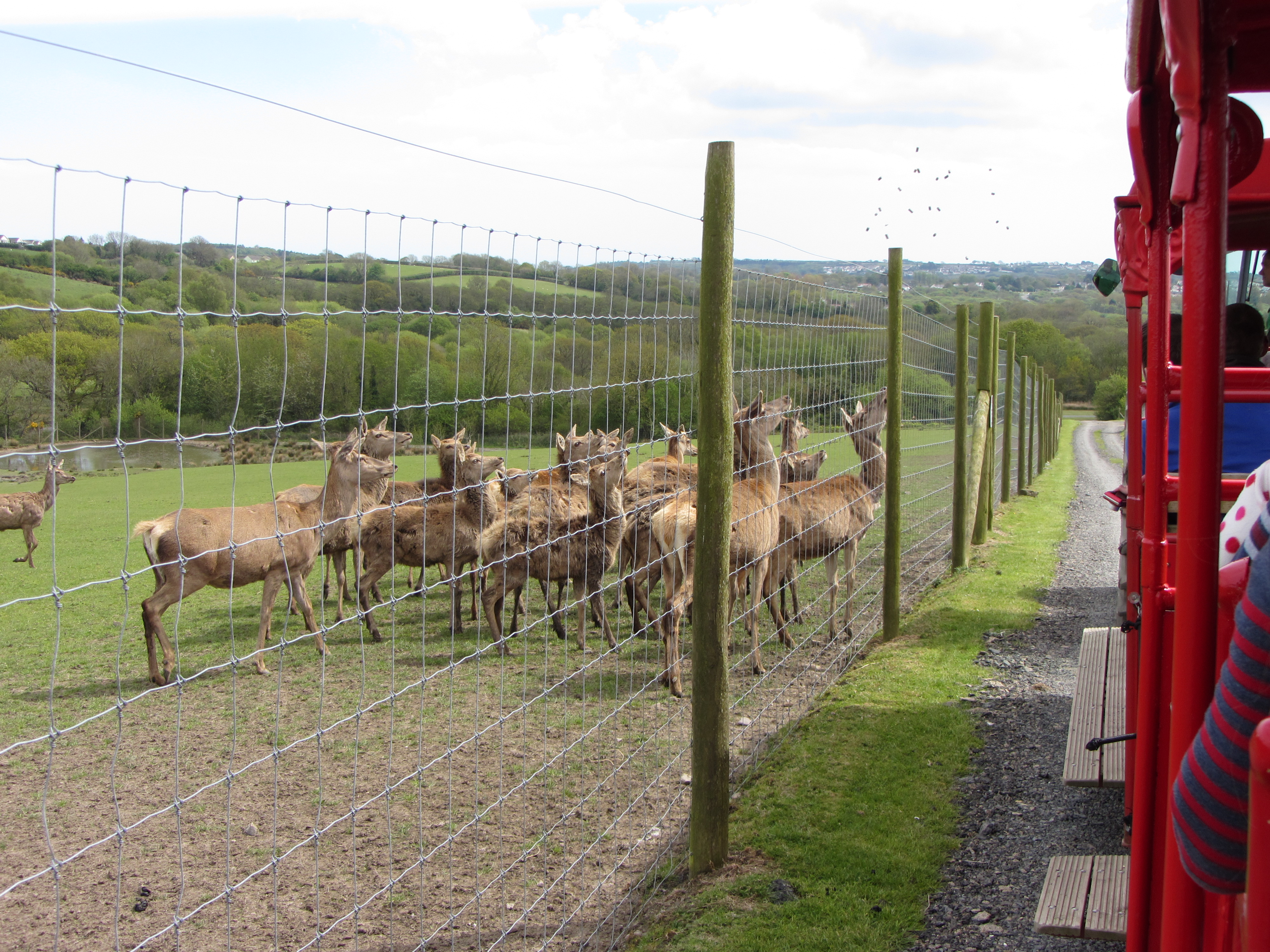
Red deer feeding event

The zoo animal collection includes:

- African lion
- African spurred tortoise
- Bactrian camel
- Barbary macaque
- Binturong
- Black-and-white ruffed lemur
- Burmese python
- Plains zebra
- Chilean flamingo
- Gooty Sapphire tarantula
- Dhole
- Dwarf crocodile
- Dwarf mongoose
- Eastern black rhinoceros
- Eastern bongo
- Emu
- Giraffe
- Greater vasa parrot
- Club Tailed iguana
- Grey crowned crane
- Humboldt penguin
- Jamaican boa
- Lowland tapir
- Macaroni penguin
- Mangrove snake
- Pancake tortoise
- Patas monkey
- Princess parrot
- Red ruffed lemur
- Ring-tailed lemur
- Sitatunga
- Speckled pigeon
- Spiny-tailed iguana
- Stanley crane
- Meerkat
- Temminck's tragopan
- Two-toed sloth
- White-faced saki
- White-naped crane
- White-rumped shama
- Yellow-crowned bishop

== Projects ==
The zoo is a member of European Association of Zoos and Aquaria and British and Irish Association of Zoos and Aquariums taking part in a European breeding program for eastern black rhinos, which are listed as critically endangered animals according to the IUCN Red List.

== Areas and attractions ==
=== Pride of Pembrokeshire ===
Opened in 2014 the Pride of Pembrokeshire lion reserve won a silver award for Best Enclosure Design at the British and Irish Association of Zoos and Aquariums (BIAZA) Annual Zoo Awards in 2015.

The lion enclosure houses Folly Farm's African lions, including Hugo and his mate Luna and their five fully grown children. Hugo was born at Knowsley Safari Park in Merseyside, and Luna was born at Blackpool Zoo. Their four cubs were born at Longleat Safari Park in Wiltshire, on 14 September 2013.

=== Penguin Coast ===
In 2013, Folly Farm added Penguin Coast, a state-of-the-art saltwater penguin enclosure which was the setting for an unusual proposal of marriage.

Penguin Coast was opened in 2013 by Edwina Hart, Minister Minister for Economy, Science and Transport and assisted by local school children from Tavernspite Primary School, who were invited to be the first children in Wales to meet the new penguins.

Penguin Coast is home to a group of 24 Peruvian Humboldt Penguins and 12 Macaroni Penguins that originated from Torquay's Living Coasts, and who had been made homeless by the closure of their Devon zoo, making it the only home to the vulnerable species population in the UK.

=== Kifaru Reserve ===
Kifaru Reserve opened in 2015 to provide a breeding facility for eastern black rhino, as part of its membership of 14 European Endangered Species Breeding Programmes (EEPs). The enclosure is five and a half acres in size with a purpose-built paddock and a bespoke rhino house including indoor facilities for rhino calves.

Kifaru Reserve is a home to Manyara who joined Folly Farm from Chester Zoo in 2015 and Nkosi who joined from Port Lympne Reserve in Kent in October 2015. Dakima joined the group in 2017. In 2020 Dakima gave birth to Glyndwr in January 2020 – the first rhino to be born in Wales.

=== Asian Adventure ===
The Asian Adventure enclosure opened in July 2019 and houses endangered Asian Wild Dogs (dholes), white naped cranes, great white pelicans, red crested pochard, and a breeding pair of red pandas, Lotus and Baika.

== Notable animals ==
Throughout its history, the zoo has had many well-known residents:

- Nkosi (male) and Manyara (female) – Two critically endangered Eastern black rhinos that arrived at Folly Farm in 2015.
- Dakima (female) – The third Eastern black rhino to arrive at the zoo in 2017.
- Glyndŵr – A critically endangered black rhino calf, born in 2020. The first-ever baby rhino in Wales was named Glyndŵr after Folly Farm founder Glyn Williams.
- Tuppee and Blackcap – A pair of two-toed sloths that moved into their new 'retirement home' in 2021.
- Elvis and Prisclla – Two pelicans that joined in 2020 and bred a couple of chicks within the year.
- Frank and Vinnie – The gay Macaroni penguins that have paired for life.

== See also ==
- Tourism in Wales
