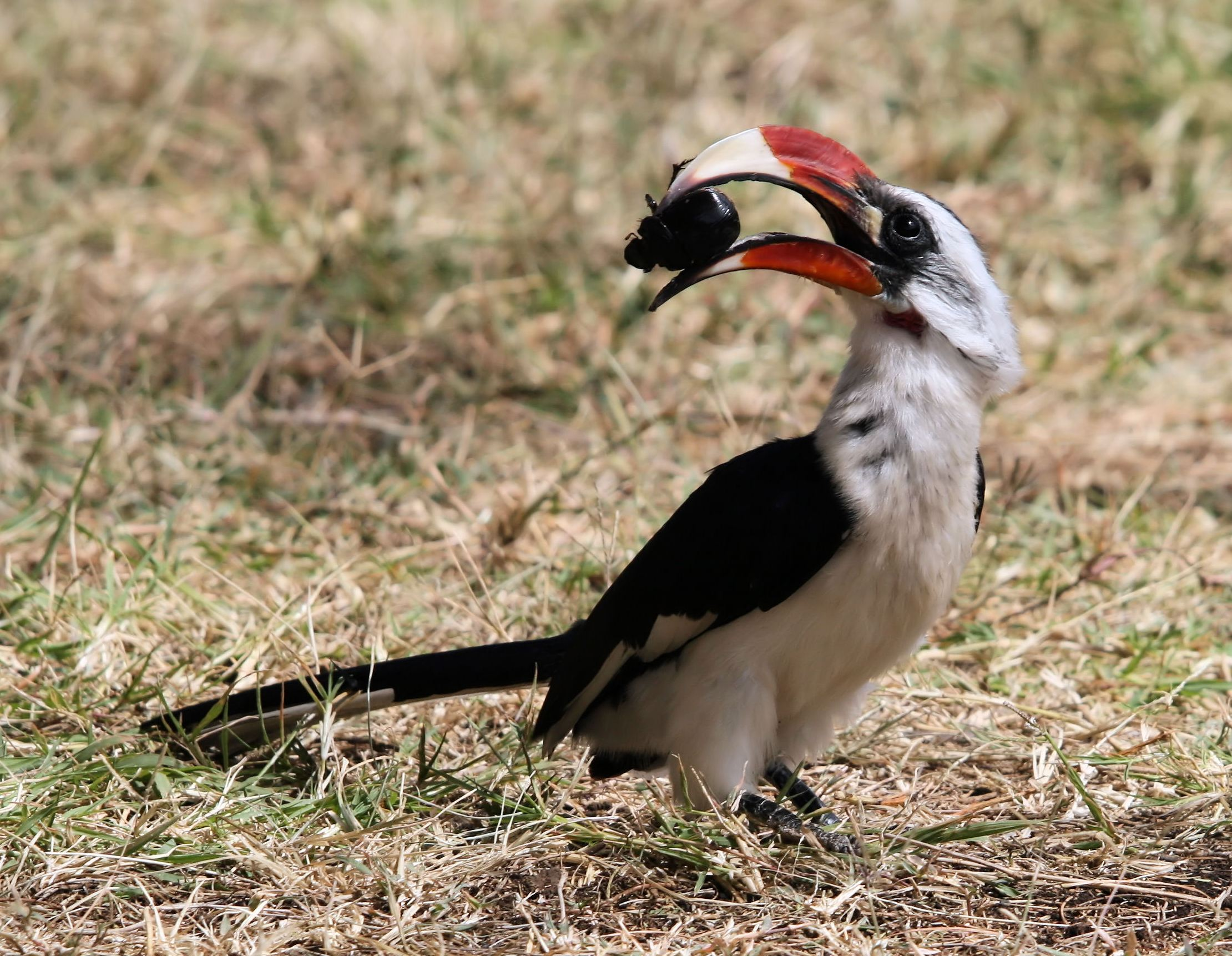
- Male
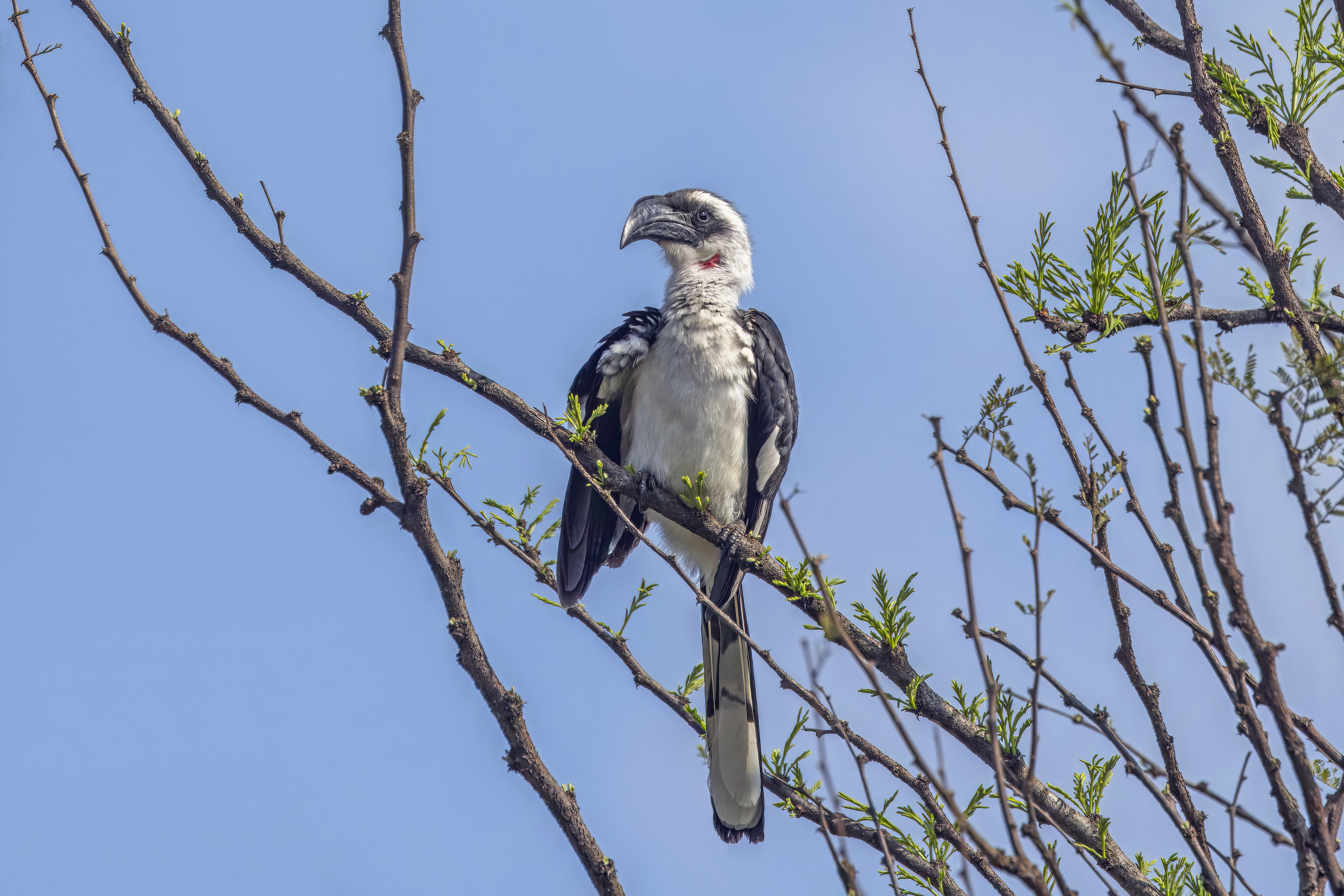
- Female both in Serengeti National Park, Tanzania

Conservation status
- Least Concern (IUCN 3.1)

Scientific classification
- Kingdom: Animalia
- Phylum: Chordata
- Class: Aves
- Order: Bucerotiformes
- Family: Bucerotidae
- Genus: Tockus
- Species: T. deckeni

Binomial name
- Tockus deckeni (Cabanis, 1868)
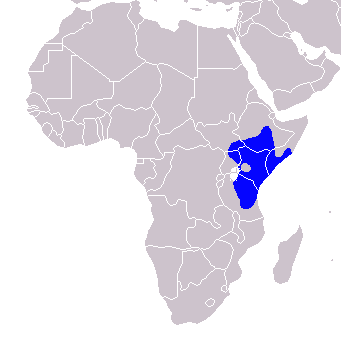
- Distribution of Von der Decken's hornbill (NOTE: Includes range of Jackson's hornbill)

= Von der Decken's hornbill =

Species of bird

Von der Decken's hornbill (Tockus deckeni) is a hornbill found in East Africa, especially to the east of the East African Rift, from Ethiopia south to Tanzania. It is found mainly in thorn scrub and similar arid habitats. Jackson's hornbill is often treated as a subspecies of it. It was named after the German explorer Baron Karl Klaus von der Decken (1833–1865).

== Description ==
This species is a small hornbill with blackish upperparts and mainly whitish underparts and head. It has a long tail and a long curved bill which lacks a casque. It is similar to the red-billed hornbill except for the bill colour and the lack of spotting on the wing coverts in both male and female.

The species shows sexual dimorphism; the female has a black bill, whereas the male has a red bill with a cream tip and a black cutting edge.

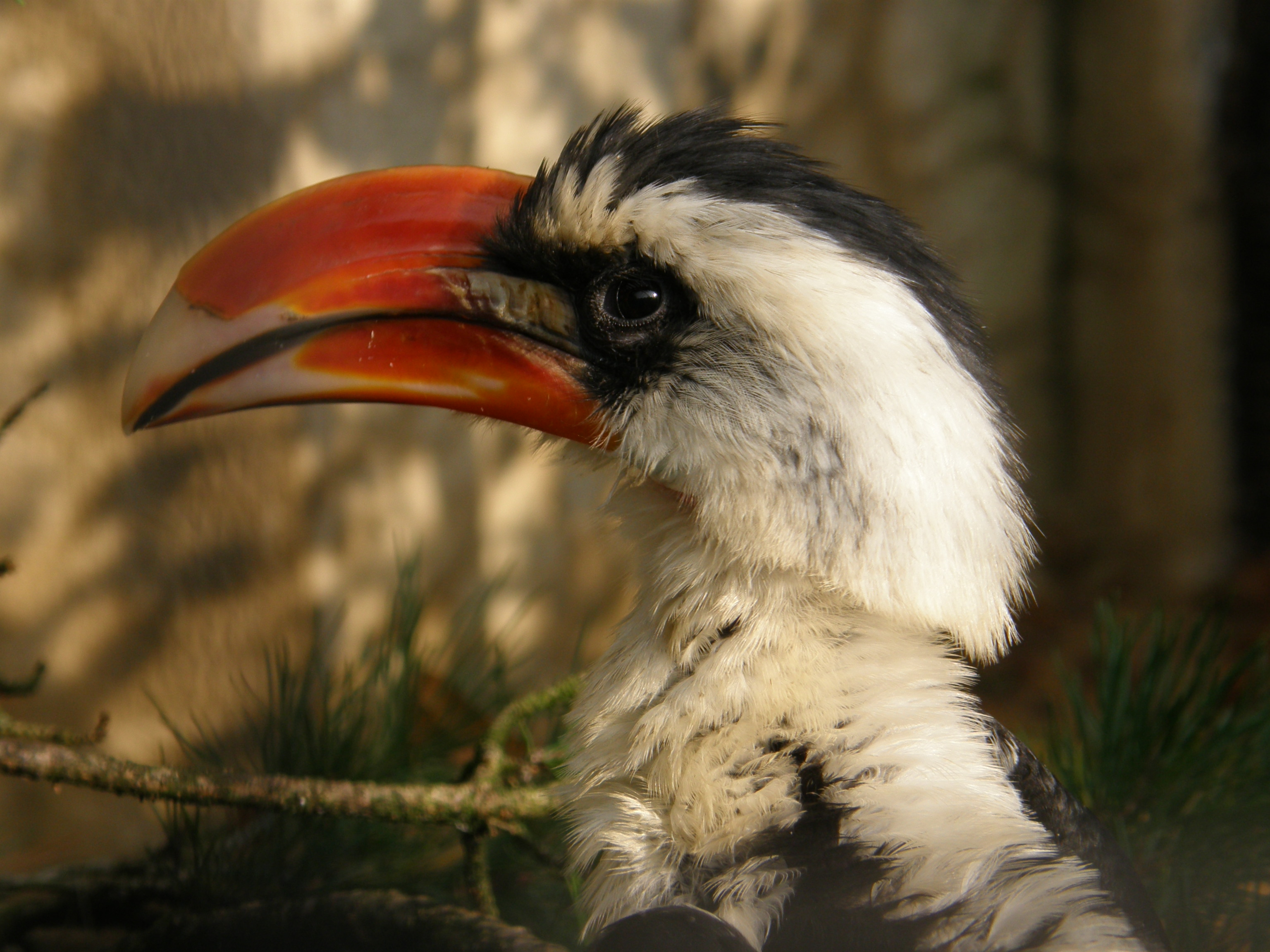
Male

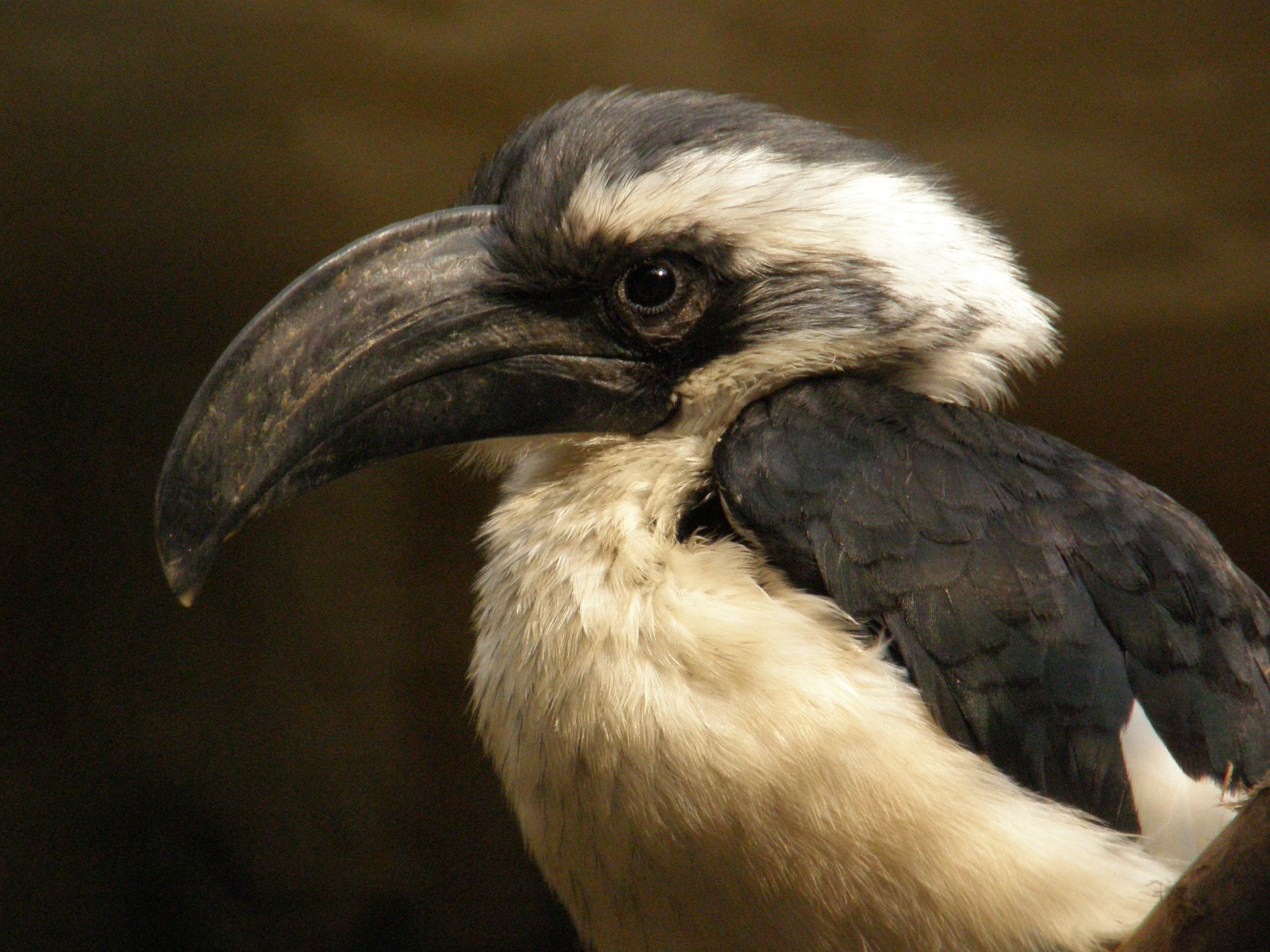
Female

== Breeding ==
During incubation, the female lays two or three white eggs in a tree hole, which is blocked off with a cement made of mud, droppings and fruit pulp. There is only one narrow aperture, just big enough for the male to transfer food to the mother and chicks.

When the chicks and the female are too big for the nest, the mother breaks out and rebuilds the wall. Then both parents feed the chicks.

Captive breeding can be achieved by providing a small barrel or hollow tree with an entrance hole 5 inches (13 cm) tall and 3 inches (7.6 cm) wide. The birds will block off the hole once the hen is ready.

== Food and feeding ==
Von der Decken's hornbill is omnivorous, taking insects, fruit and seeds. It feeds mainly on the ground and will form flocks outside the breeding season. In captivity, Von Der Decken's hornbill will readily eat papaya, cantaloupe, blueberries, bananas, and apples. Live food such as crickets and mealworms should also be offered daily. Small rodents are readily taken but should only be offered two or three times a week.
