= Norfolk Grey =

Breed of chicken

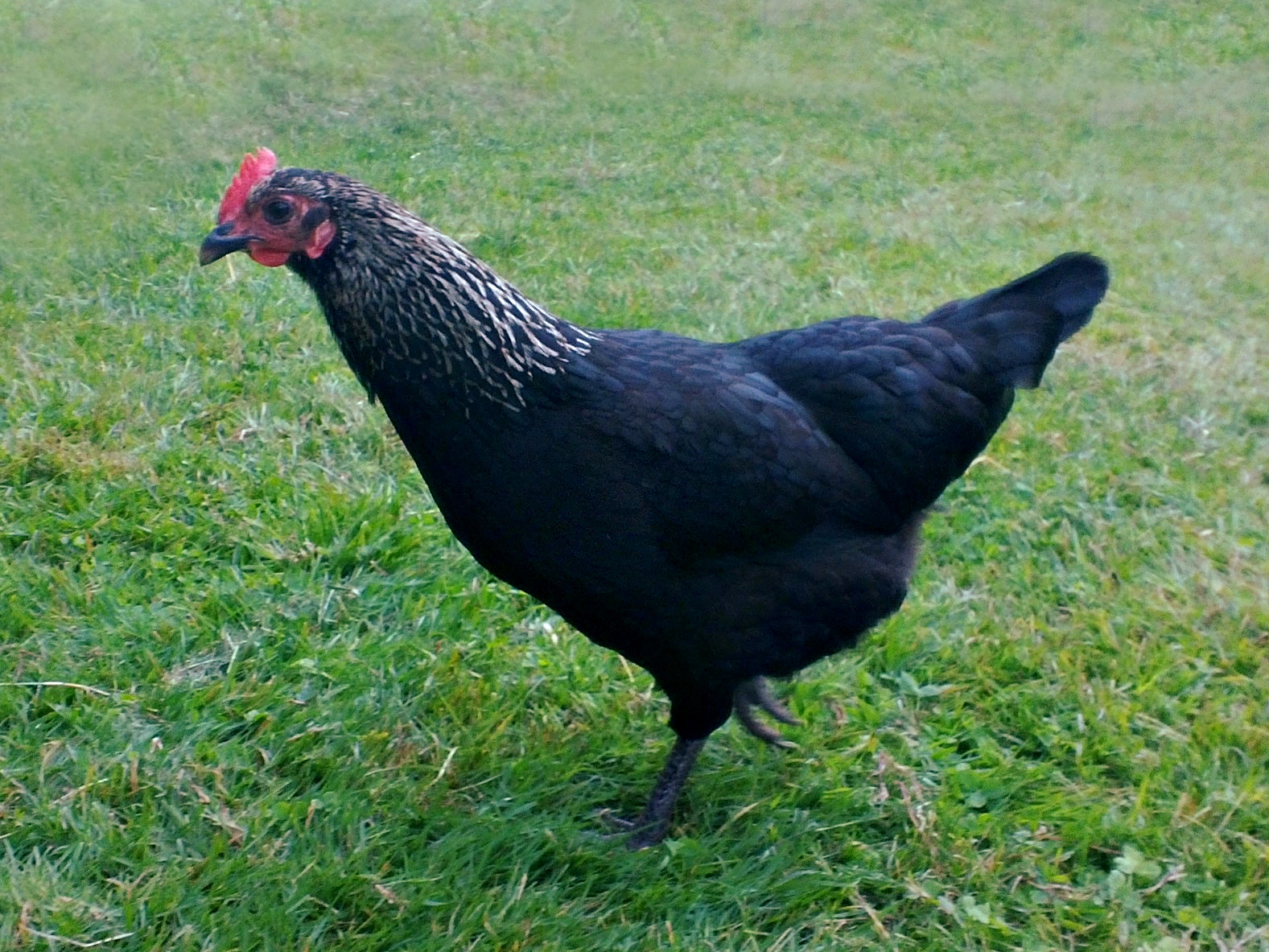
- 14-month-old Norfolk Grey hen
- Conservation status: RBST: At risk
- Country of origin: United Kingdom
- Use: meat, eggs, exhibition

Traits
- Weight: Male: 3.2 kg; Female: 2.7 kg
- Skin color: white
- Egg color: tinted
- Comb type: single

Classification
- PCGB: rare soft feather: heavy
- Chicken; Gallus gallus domesticus

The Norfolk Grey is a British utility breed of chicken that originated near the city of Norwich, in Norfolk, England, in around 1910. The breed was originally created by Frederick W Myhill of Hethel, Wymondham under the name Black Maria. It is a rare breed which is currently considered to be at risk by the Rare Breeds Survival Trust.

== History ==
The breed was originally created by Myhill before 1914, possibly as early as 1908. During the First World War, the breed was allowed to free range while Myhill had departed for military service. On return, Myhill discovered that the birds had cross bred with other breeds and the strain had to be recreated.

The Norfolk Grey was first exhibited under the name Black Maria at the Dairy Show in 1920. In 1925, Myhill applied to the Poultry Club of Great Britain in 1925 to have the name changed to Norfolk Grey as the breed did not gain popularity under Black Maria.

The Norfolk Grey came close to dying out in the early 1970s but a private flock containing 4 birds was found in 1974 and the breed was revived.

== Characteristics ==
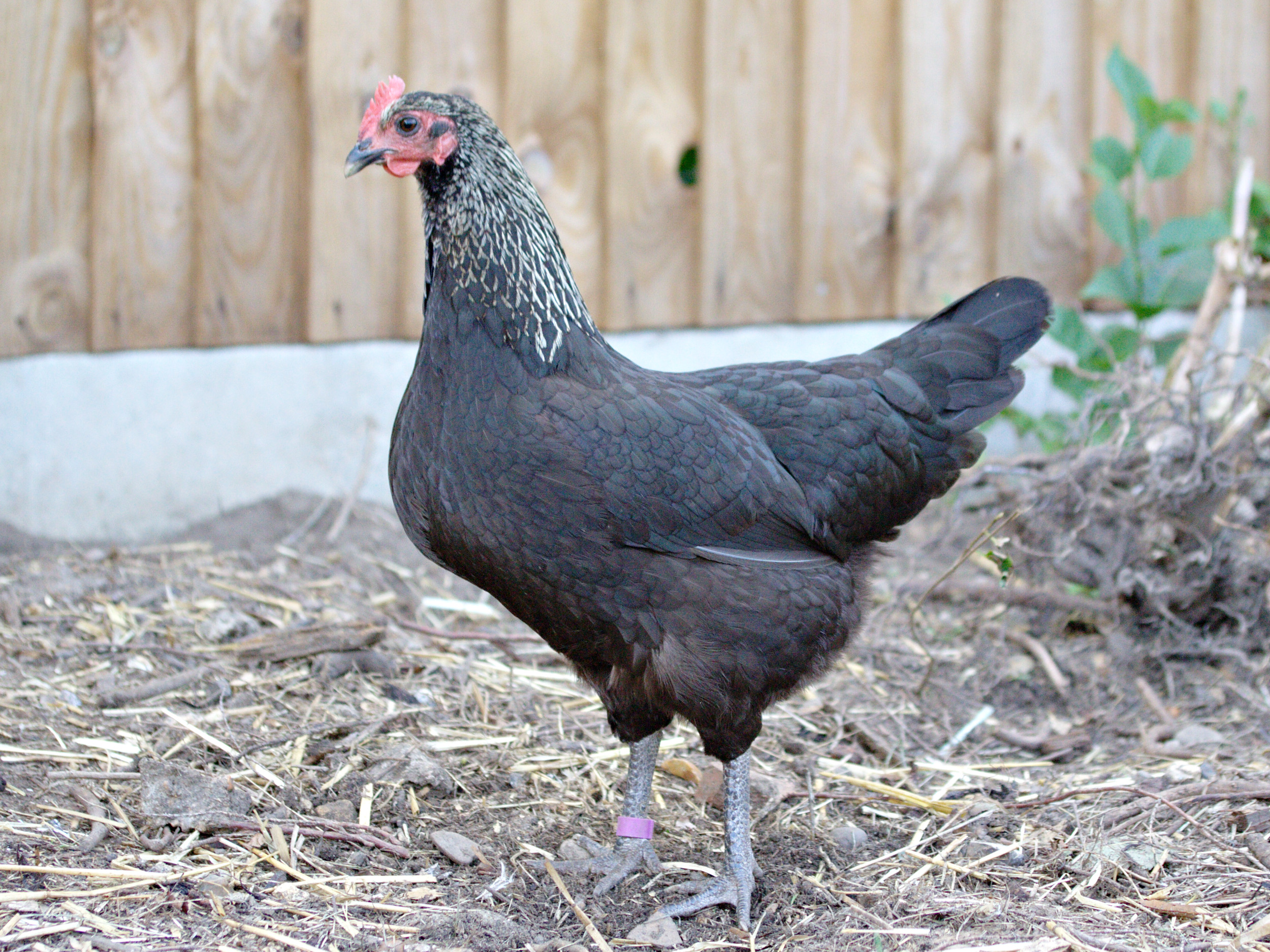
14-month-old Norfolk Grey hen with a full crop

Norfolk Grey is considered to be a heavy breed but does not grow as large as many other heavy breeds. The development of this breed is not factually known but it is thought that Birchen English Game and possibly Duckwing Leghorns were used in the makeup. The game inclusion would account for the excellent meating ability and the Leghorn for the laying ability.

They have a single comb and a red face with black eyes while the legs are slate or black. Plumage is attractively marked and the male has a beautiful silver hackle striped with black as is the neck, back, saddle and wing feathers, while the rest of the plumage is black. The hen's hackle is similar to the cockerels but she has an otherwise rich black feathering all over apart from the throat which is silver laced.

They can produce a good-sized carcass for meat production if they are allowed to mature slowly and are regulars at shows where they win prizes.

The Norfolk Grey is an excellent forager and does well when free ranging. Cocks usually weigh some 3.2 to 3.6 kg (7 to 8 lb), and hens 2.25 to 2.7 kg (5 to 6 lb).

== Utility aspects ==
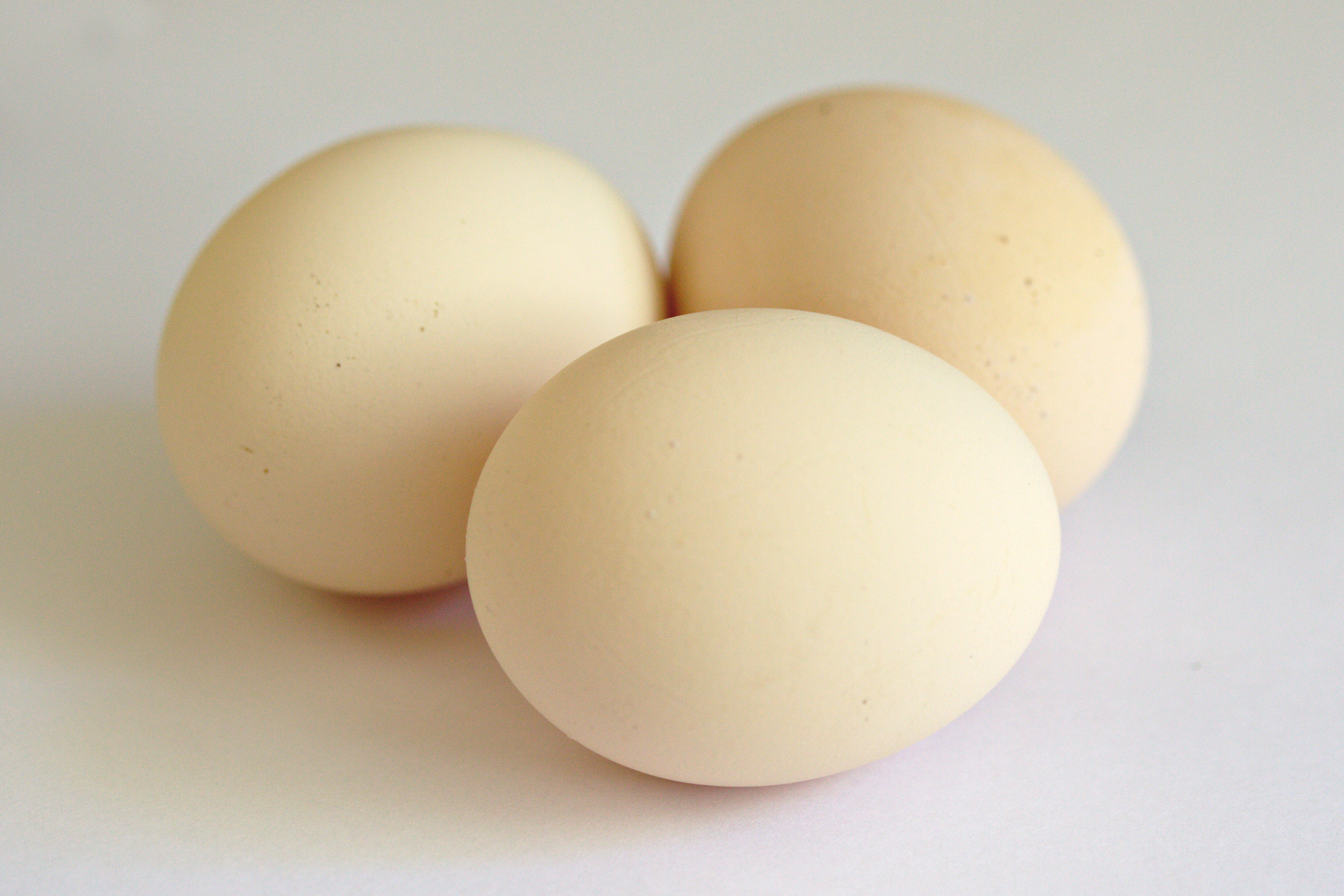
Typically coloured eggs from a one-year-old Norfolk Grey hen

The Norfolk Grey was bred to be a utility bird, both for production of eggs and for the table.

=== Eggs ===
Approximately 150-220 tinted (pale brown), medium-sized eggs per year from a healthy hen, and the breed can be expected to continue laying well throughout winter.

=== Meat ===
Cockerels make good table birds if allowed to mature slowly. The meat is more gamey than most other common breeds.

== See also ==
- List of chicken breeds
- Rare Poultry Society
