= Mangrove snake =

Mangrove snake may refer to:

- Boiga dendrophila, native to Asia
- Erythrolamprus cobella, native to South America
- Nerodia clarkii compressicauda, native to Florida
- Myron, a genus of marine snakes native to northern Australia, the Aru Islands and New Guinea
