= Myron (snake) =

Scientific classification
- Kingdom: Animalia
- Phylum: Chordata
- Class: Reptilia
- Order: Squamata
- Suborder: Serpentes
- Family: Homalopsidae
- Genus: Myron; Gray, 1849

Genus of snakes

Myron is a genus of snakes in the family Homalopsidae. They are commonly known as 'mangrove snakes'.

== Geographic range ==
Snakes of the genus Myron are found in Australia, Indonesia and Papua New Guinea.

== Species ==
- Myron karnsi Murphy, 2011
- Myron resetari Murphy, 2011
- Myron richardsonii Gray, 1849
