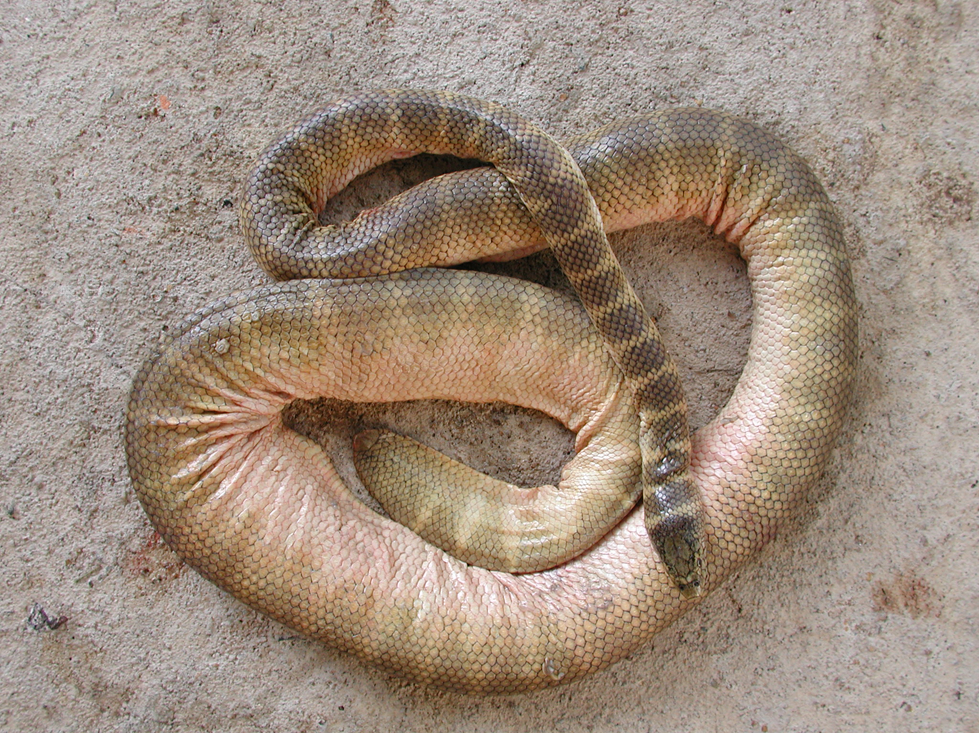

Conservation status
- Data Deficient (IUCN 3.1)

Scientific classification
- Kingdom: Animalia
- Phylum: Chordata
- Class: Reptilia
- Order: Squamata
- Suborder: Serpentes
- Family: Elapidae
- Genus: Hydrophis
- Species: H. belcheri

Binomial name
- Hydrophis belcheri (Gray, 1849)

Synonyms
- Aturia belcheri Gray, 1849; Hydrophis belcheri — Günther, 1864; Distira belcheri — Boulenger, 1888; Hydrophis belcheri — Cogger, 1983; Chitulia belcheri — Kharin, 2005; Hydrophis belcheri — Cogger, 2014

= Hydrophis belcheri =

Species of snake

Hydrophis belcheri, commonly known as the faint-banded sea snake or Belcher's sea snake, is an extremely venomous species of sea snake. It has a timid temperament and would normally have to be subjected to severe mistreatment before biting. Usually those bitten are fishermen handling nets, although only one-quarter of those bitten are envenomated since the snake rarely injects much of its venom. Although not much is known about the venom of this species, its LD_{50} toxicity in mice has been determined to be 0.24 mg/kg when delivered intramuscularly.

Belcher's sea snake, which many times is mistakenly called the "hook-nosed sea snake" (Enhydrina schistosa), has been erroneously popularized as the most venomous snake in the world, due to Ernst and Zug's published book Snakes in Question: The Smithsonian Answer Book from 1996. Associate Professor Bryan Grieg Fry, a prominent venom expert, has clarified the error: "The hook nosed myth was due to a fundamental error in a book called 'Snakes in question'. In there, all the toxicity testing results were lumped in together, regardless of the mode of testing (e.g. subcutaneous vs. intramuscular vs intravenous vs intraperitoneal). As the mode can influence the relative number, venoms can only be compared within a mode. Otherwise, it's apples and rocks." Studies on mice and human cardiac cell culture show that venom of the inland taipan, drop by drop, is the most toxic among all snakes; land or sea. The most venomous sea snake is actually Dubois' seasnake (Aipysurus duboisii).

== Description ==
Belcher's sea snake is of moderate size, ranging from 0.5 to 1.0 m (about 20–40 in) in adult length. Its thin body is usually chrome yellowish in colour with dark-greenish crossbands. The dorsal pattern does not extend onto the venter. The head is short and has bands of the same colours. Its mouth is very small but suitable for aquatic life. Its body, when viewed out of water, appears to have a faint yellow colour. Its scales are different from most other snakes in that they overlap each other. Each dorsal scale has a central tubercle. The body is strongly laterally compressed posteriorly. The ventral scales are very narrow, only slightly wider than the dorsal scales.

== Taxonomic history ==
This species was first described and named by John Edward Gray in 1849.

== Etymology ==
Hydrophis comes from Greek ὕδωρ, hydōr = water + ὄφις, ophis = serpent.

The specific name, belcheri, commemorates the Nova Scotian, Royal Navy Captain, later Admiral, Sir Edward Belcher KCB, RN (1799-1877) who collected the holotype.

== Common names ==
H. belcheri is also referred to as Belcher's ocean snake. Belcher's sea snake has been mistakenly called the "hook-nosed sea snake" (which is actually Enhydrina schistosa) and in one instance was called the "blue-banded sea snake" (which is actually one common name for Hydrophis cyanocinctus).
