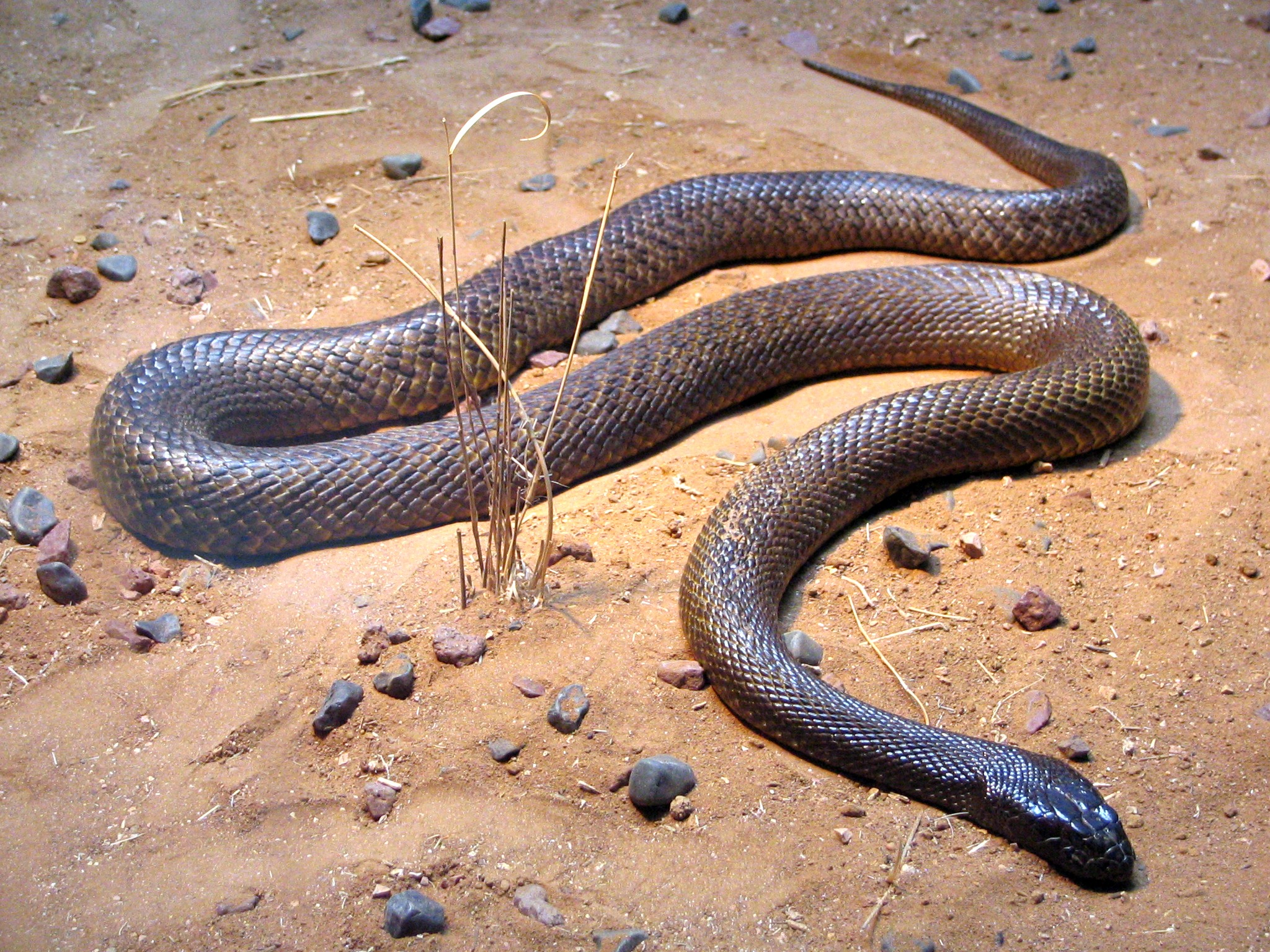
- Oxyuranus microlepidotus at Australia Zoo

Conservation status
- Least Concern (IUCN 3.1)

Scientific classification
- Kingdom: Animalia
- Phylum: Chordata
- Class: Reptilia
- Order: Squamata
- Suborder: Serpentes
- Family: Elapidae
- Genus: Oxyuranus
- Species: O. microlepidotus

Binomial name
- Oxyuranus microlepidotus (F. McCoy, 1879)
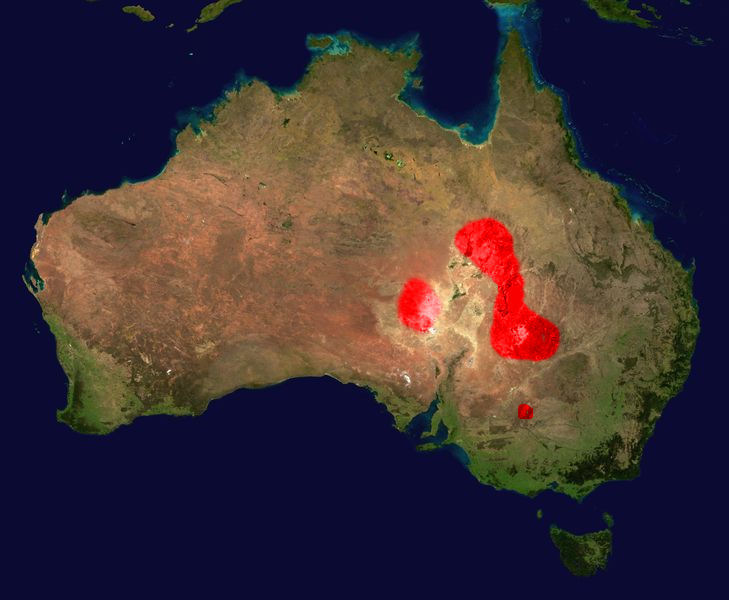
- General range of inland taipan (in red). The current, documented range of the species is more limited.

Synonyms
- Diemenia microlepidota F. McCoy, 1879; Diemenia ferox Macleay, 1882; Pseudechis microlepidotus / Pseudechis ferox Boulenger, 1896; Parademansia microlepidota Kinghorn, 1955; Oxyuranus scutellatus microlepidotus Worrell, 1963; Oxyuranus microlepidotus Covacevich et al., 1981

= Inland taipan =

Extremely venomous snake native to Australia

The inland taipan (Oxyuranus microlepidotus), also commonly known as the western taipan, small-scaled snake, or fierce snake, is a species of extremely venomous snake in the family Elapidae. It is endemic to semiarid regions of central‑eastern Australia. Aboriginal Australians living in areas where Karnic languages are spoken refer to this species as dandarabilla.

The species was formally described by Frederick McCoy in 1879 and William John Macleay in 1882, but for almost 90 years, it remained poorly known to science; no additional specimens were collected and virtually nothing was added to knowledge of its biology until the species was rediscovered in 1972.

Based on the median lethal dose (LD_{50}) of its venom in laboratory mice, the inland taipan is widely regarded as the most venomous snake in the world; its venom is substantially more toxic, drop-for-drop, than that of any tested sea snake. It is also considered to possess the most toxic venom of any reptile when tested on human heart cell cultures. The inland taipan is a specialised predator of mammals, and its venom is particularly adapted to killing warm-blooded prey. A single bite has been estimated to contain sufficient venom to kill more than 100 adult humans.

Despite this extreme potency, the inland taipan is usually shy and reclusive, with a generally placid disposition, and it rarely comes into contact with people because it inhabits remote areas. By contrast, the coastal taipan (Oxyuranus scutellatus) is often considered the more dangerous species in practice, largely because of its behaviour when it encounters humans and its proximity to populated coastal regions. The word "fierce" in one of the inland taipan's common names refers to the strength of its venom rather than its temperament.

== Taxonomy ==
Among the Aboriginal people from the area now known as Goyder Lagoon in north‑eastern South Australia, the inland taipan was traditionally known as dandarabilla.

The inland taipan was first described scientifically in 1879, when two specimens were collected at the junction of the Murray and Darling Rivers in north‑western Victoria. Frederick McCoy described these as Diemenia microlepidota, the "small‑scaled brown snake". In 1882 a third specimen was collected near Bourke, New South Wales, and William John Macleay described it as Diemenia ferox, believing it to be a different species. No further material was collected until the 1967.

In 1896, George Albert Boulenger transferred both taxa to the genus Pseudechis (black snakes), treating them as Pseudechis microlepidotus and P. ferox. In 1956, working solely from the published descriptions and notes, James Roy Kinghorn regarded ferox as a synonym of microlepidotus and proposed the new genus Parademansia for the species.

In 1963, Eric Worrell considered Parademansia microlepidotus conspecific with Oxyuranus scutellatus (then commonly known simply as the "taipan"). However, in September 1972 an unclassified snake head collected by a grazier on a Channel Country station west of Windorah in south‑western Queensland was sent to the Queensland Museum. Herpetologists Jeanette Covacevich and Charles Tanner travelled to the site, located 13 live specimens, and thereby rediscovered the long‑lost "western taipan" Parademansia microlepidotus.

In 1976, Covacevich and Wombey argued that Parademansia microlepidotus was sufficiently distinct to warrant generic recognition, a view shared by Harold Cogger. Subsequently, Covacevich, McDowell, Tanner and Mengden (1981) compared anatomical characters, chromosomes, and behaviour of the two then‑recognised species Oxyuranus scutellatus and Parademansia microlepidota and concluded that both belonged in a single genus. The older name Oxyuranus (erected in 1923), therefore, had priority and was adopted for the combined genus.

The current binomial name of the inland taipan has therefore been Oxyuranus microlepidotus since the early 1980s. The generic name Oxyuranus derives from the Greek oxys ("sharp" or "needle‑like") and ouranos ("arch", specifically the arch of the palate), referring to the needle‑like anterior process on the palatal arch. The specific epithet microlepidotus is from Latin and means "small‑scaled", referring to the small body scales, and is the origin of the common name "small‑scaled snake".

Once Covacevich et al. (1981) had shown that the fierce snake (formerly Parademansia microlepidota) belonged to the genus Oxyuranus, the name "taipan" (derived from the Aboriginal term dhayban) was retained for O. scutellatus, which became known as the coastal taipan (or "eastern taipan"), while O. microlepidotus came to be widely referred to as the "inland (or western) taipan").

== Distribution and habitat ==
The inland taipan occurs on cracking‑clay plains in semiarid regions near the border of Queensland and South Australia.

In Queensland, the species has been recorded from the Channel Country bioregion, including Diamantina National Park, Durrie Station, Morney Plains Station and Astrebla Downs National Park. In South Australia it has been observed in the Marree–Innamincka NRM district, including Goyder Lagoon, the Tirari Desert, Sturt Stony Desert, Coongie Lakes, Innamincka Regional Reserve and near Oodnadatta. An isolated population is also known from near Coober Pedy, South Australia.

Two historical records exist from further south‑east, at the junction of the Murray and Darling Rivers in north‑western Victoria (1879) and near Bourke, New South Wales (1882), but the species has not been recorded from either state since the late 19th century.

=== Conservation status ===
Like all native snakes in Australia, the inland taipan is protected by law. The species was assessed for the IUCN Red List for the first time in July 2017, and in 2018 it was listed as least concern. The assessment notes that the species is widespread within its range and is not thought to be in overall decline, although the potential impacts of threats require further investigation and may be locally significant.

National and state‑level conservation listings differ because they reflect status within individual jurisdictions:

South Australia: listed as least concern within the Outback region Queensland: formerly listed as rare, then as near threatened (May 2010 – December 2014), and currently (since December 2014) as least concern. New South Wales: listed as presumed Extinct on the basis that it has not been recorded in suitable habitat despite targeted surveys conducted over an appropriate timeframe for the species’ life cycle. Victoria: listed as regionally extinct, but exhaustive surveys in all suitable habitats within Victoria have failed to locate the species, though it still occurs elsewhere within its global range. The Australian Museum likewise lists the inland taipan as "presumed extinct" in Victoria.

=== In captivity ===
Inland taipans are held in a number of zoological collections in Australia and overseas. In Australia, they are maintained, and in some cases bred, at institutions including Adelaide Zoo and Taronga Zoo in Sydney. The species is also on public display at Australia Zoo, the Australian Reptile Park, Billabong Sanctuary, Cairns Tropical Zoo, Lone Pine Koala Sanctuary and Shoalhaven Zoo.

Outside Australia, inland taipans are kept in several North American zoos, including Reptile Gardens in South Dakota, Kentucky Reptile Zoo and Animal World and Snake Farm Zoo in Texas.

In Europe, the species is held at the Stockholm Skansen Zoo and Gothenburg Universeum in Sweden, at Moscow Zoo in Russia, and at the London Zoo in the United Kingdom. Various smaller facilities and private collections in continental Europe also maintain the species.

In Asia, inland taipans are held at Singapore Zoo, where they have been the subject of detailed veterinary case reports.

==== Private ownership law ====
In the Australian state of New South Wales, private ownership of an inland taipan is legal only for keepers who hold the highest class of venomous reptile licence, reflecting the very high risk associated with the species.

== Description ==
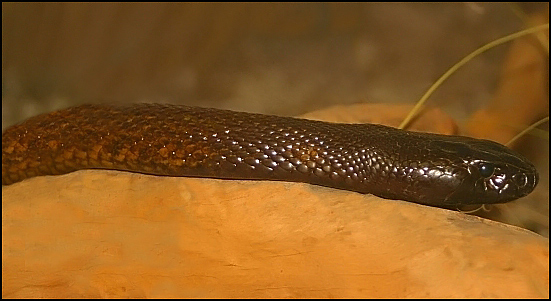
Brown‑coloured (winter)

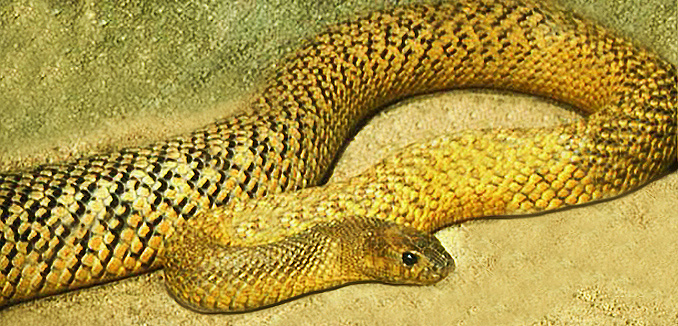
Olive‑coloured (summer)

The inland taipan is typically dark tan in overall colour, varying from a rich, dark brown to a brownish light green depending on season. The back, flanks, and tail may show various shades of brown and grey. Many dorsal scales have broad blackish margins, which because the scales are arranged in diagonal rows, align to form broken chevron‑like markings that slope backwards and downwards. The lowermost lateral scales frequently have a yellowish anterior edge. The dorsal scales are smooth and lack keels.

The rounded snout, head and neck are usually noticeably darker than the body – glossy black in winter and dark brown in summer. This darker pigmentation is thought to assist thermoregulation by allowing the snake to absorb heat while exposing only a small portion of the body at the entrance of a burrow. The eyes are of moderate size with dark brown to blackish irises and without a distinct pale ring around the pupil.

The species has 23 rows of dorsal scales at midbody, 55–70 divided subcaudal scales, and a single anal scale. The average total length is about 1.8 m (5.9 ft), although larger individuals can attain 2.5 m (8.2 ft). The fangs measure about 3.5–6.2 mm, somewhat shorter than those of the coastal taipan.

=== Seasonal adaptation ===
Inland taipans exhibit seasonal colour change, a form of physiological adaptation that assists thermoregulation. Individuals tend to become darker in winter and paler in summer. Darker pigmentation in cooler months increases absorption of solar radiation, thus facilitating warming, whereas lighter tones in summer may reduce heat load.

== Breeding ==
Inland taipans are oviparous, typically producing clutches of 10–24 eggs. Eggs are usually laid in abandoned mammal burrows, deep rock crevices, or similar sheltered sites. Incubation lasts about two months, though the duration is influenced by temperature and humidity. Reproductive output appears to depend in part on food availability; in years when prey is scarce, females may not breed or may lay smaller clutches.

In captivity, inland taipans generally live for around 10–15 years, although longer lifespans have been recorded. An individual at Australia Zoo reportedly lived for more than 20 years.

== Feeding ==
In the wild, the inland taipan is a dietary specialist that feeds almost exclusively on small to medium‑sized mammals, particularly rodents such as the long-haired rat (Rattus villosissimus), plains rat (Pseudomys australis), introduced house mouse (Mus musculus), and various dasyurid marsupials. In captivity, the species also takes day‑old chicks.

Unlike many other highly venomous snakes, which often strike once and then retreat while the prey succumbs, the inland taipan typically employs a rapid, close‑quarters attack. It may deliver up to eight envenoming bites in a single attack, frequently snapping its jaws several times to inflict multiple puncture wounds. During this attack, the snake commonly maintains physical contact with the prey, using its body to restrain the animal while repeatedly biting. This strategy injects large quantities of extremely toxic venom deeply into the tissues, causing almost immediate incapacitation and leaving the prey little opportunity to struggle or inflict injury on the snake.

== Natural threats ==
The inland taipan has few natural predators as an adult, but juveniles are vulnerable. The mulga snake (Pseudechis australis) is resistant to the venom of many Australian snakes and has been documented preying on young inland taipans. The large monitor lizard perentie (Varanus giganteus) shares much of the inland taipan's habitat, and once large enough, readily preys on venomous snakes, including taipans.

== Interaction with humans ==
Many experienced reptile keepers consider the inland taipan to be comparatively placid to handle, at least in controlled conditions, although its potential to inflict a rapidly fatal bite means that extreme caution is always required.

In the wild, inland taipans are seldom encountered by the general public because of their remote distribution and their tendency to remain underground for much of the day. If a person approaches quietly without causing strong vibrations or noise, the snake may not perceive them as a threat and may remain motionless or attempt to retreat. Nevertheless, a safe distance must always be maintained because any bite is a medical emergency.

When threatened, the inland taipan usually attempts escape, but if it is cornered, provoked, mishandled or prevented from fleeing, it adopts a characteristic threat posture in which the anterior body is raised in a tight, low, S‑shaped curve with the head oriented towards the source of danger. If the warning is ignored, it may strike with great speed and precision, and it envenomates in the vast majority of bites.

Clinical toxicologist, venom researcher, and herpetologist Scott A. Weinstein and colleagues have noted that only a small number of inland taipan bites have been documented in the medical literature. In an analysis published in Toxicon, they reported 11 well‑documented cases of envenoming, only two of which were inflicted by wild snakes. They emphasised that, when indicated, early administration of adequate antivenom, combined with rapid pressure‑immobilisation first aid and efficient retrieval of victims from remote locations (preferably by well‑equipped aircraft), is central to achieving favourable outcomes.

=== Snakebite victims ===
Most confirmed inland taipan bites have involved herpetologists, professional snake handlers, venom extractors or zoo keepers. Since the introduction of specific taipan antivenom, no deaths have been conclusively attributed to inland taipan bites, although recovery can be prolonged and complications may be severe.

A notable early case of survival without antivenom was recorded in 1967. On 15 September, a tour guide was bitten while attempting to capture a snake for a tour group in the Channel Country. He was transported to Broken Hill Hospital and subsequently to Queen Elizabeth Hospital in Adelaide. Because he reported a severe allergy to horse serum and believed he had been bitten by a brown snake, antivenom was not administered. He was hospitalised for four weeks with a clinical picture likened to severe myasthenia gravis. The snake itself was initially identified by Eric Worrell as a coastal taipan, but following the species’ rediscovery, it was recognised as an inland taipan.

In 1984, Australian toxicologist Peter Mirtschin was bitten by a three‑week‑old inland taipan and became the first recorded patient to receive taipan antivenom for this species.

In September 2012, a teenaged boy in Kurri Kurri, New South Wales, more than 1,000 kilometres (620 mi) from the species’ natural range, was bitten on the finger by an inland taipan being kept illegally in captivity. The victim applied a compression bandage promptly and was treated with polyvalent antivenom at the local hospital, surviving without major sequelae.

In December 2013, reptile handler Scott Grant was bitten while demonstrating an inland taipan at a public event in Portland, Victoria. He applied a bandage and sought emergent medical care. He experienced convulsions and was airlifted in a serious condition to Royal Melbourne Hospital, where he was stabilised and ultimately recovered. Only a small amount of venom appears to have been injected, and some of his early symptoms were attributed to an allergic reaction, likely related to his history of multiple previous snake bites.

Weinstein et al. (2017) described a case in which a field herpetologist was bitten while attempting to photograph a roughly 1.5 m (4.9 ft) inland taipan in remote outback South Australia. The victim developed drowsiness and blurred vision progressing to ptosis, followed by dysphagia and dysarthria. He received one vial of polyvalent antivenom followed by two vials of monovalent taipan antivenom; he required intubation and three days of intensive care and experienced a unilateral ophthalmoplegia that persisted for about one week before resolving.

Wildlife presenter Rob Bredl has reported that his father, Joe Bredl, was bitten by an inland taipan in a remote area of South Australia and barely survived, and that a colleague, John Robinson, suffered significant muscle and cardiac damage after a bite sustained while cleaning a captive inland taipan's enclosure on the Sunshine Coast, Queensland, although both survived, in Robinson’s case reportedly without antivenom.

== Venom ==
The average venom yield per bite of an adult inland taipan has been estimated at about 44 mg, with a recorded maximum of 110 mg. For comparison, typical yields for the Indian cobra (Naja naja) are around 169 mg (maximum 610 mg), and for the North American eastern diamondback rattlesnake (Crotalus adamanteus) about 410 mg (maximum 848 mg).

The median lethal dose (LD_{50}) of inland taipan venom in mice, administered subcutaneously – the route most relevant to typical snake bites – is approximately 0.025 mg/kg, or as low as 0.01 mg/kg when dissolved in bovine serum albumin. This is markedly lower (i.e. more toxic) than values reported for many other dangerously venomous snakes, including the beaked sea snake (Enhydrina schistosa; 0.164 mg/kg), Indian cobra (0.565 mg/kg), and eastern diamondback rattlesnake (11.4 mg/kg). Although the inland taipan’s total venom yield is smaller than that of the coastal taipan, its venom is almost four times as toxic on a weight‑for‑weight basis. A single bite is estimated to contain enough venom to kill at least 100 adult humans.

Intravenous, intraperitoneal, and intramuscular LD_{50} values for inland taipan venom have not been systematically determined in the published literature.

For many years, Belcher's sea snake (Hydrophis belcheri) was popularly but erroneously described as the most venomous snake, largely because toxicity data from different modes of administration were conflated in a widely read book, Snakes in Question: The Smithsonian Answer Book (1996). Venom researcher Bryan Grieg Fry has pointed out that LD_{50} values can only be meaningfully compared when determined using the same route of administration; otherwise, comparisons are invalid. Belcher's sea snake venom, tested intramuscularly, has reported LD_{50} values of 0.24 mg/kg and 0.155 mg/kg, less toxic than several other sea snake venoms, including that of the olive sea snake (Aipysurus laevis; 0.09 mg/kg) and especially the black‑banded robust sea snake (Hydrophis melanosoma; 0.082 mg/kg intramuscularly). The latter species has also been tested subcutaneously (0.111 mg/kg), a value comparable to that of the coastal taipan and still less than one-fourth as toxic as inland taipan venom. Based on subcutaneous LD_{50} values, Dubois' sea snake (Aipysurus duboisii) currently ranks as the most toxic of the sea snakes (0.044 mg/kg), yet its venom remains less than half as lethal as that of the inland taipan.

Experimental work indicates that the venoms of juvenile and adult inland taipans are similar in composition and toxicity; juvenile venom is not significantly weaker than adult venom.

The venom of the inland taipan contains a complex mixture of toxins, including:

- Potent neurotoxins:
  - Presynaptic beta‑neurotoxins such as paradoxin (PDX) (PDX is considered to be among the most potent beta‑neurotoxins yet described; it interferes with the release of the neurotransmitter acetylcholine from nerve endings, leading to neuromuscular blockade.)
  - Postsynaptic neurotoxins such as oxylepitoxin-1 α-oxytoxin 1, and α-scutoxin 1
- Hemotoxins with strong procoagulant activity, affecting blood clotting
- Myotoxins that damage muscle tissue
- Possible toxins
  - Nephrotoxins, affecting the kidneys
  - Haemorrhagins, which damage the vascular endothelium
- The enzyme hyaluronidase, which facilitates rapid spread of venom through tissues

Ronelle Welton of James Cook University has noted that despite their medical importance, the venoms of Oxyuranus species remain relatively understudied at the molecular level. As of 2005, the amino‑acid sequences of only seven inland taipan venom proteins had been deposited in the SWISS‑PROT database.

=== Clinical effects ===
Untreated inland taipan bites have a very high mortality rate:

- Severe envenoming is likely after a significant bite
- The rate of systemic envenoming is estimated at more than 80%
- The untreated case fatality rate is also thought to exceed 80%

Clinically, envenoming can produce a complex, multisystem picture in which neurotoxic effects usually dominate but may be accompanied by coagulopathy, rhabdomyolysis, and acute kidney injury. Early local symptoms include pain at the bite site, often followed by nonspecific systemic features such as headache, nausea, vomiting, abdominal pain, diarrhoea, dizziness, collapse, or convulsions. Major complications then develop, including progressive neurotoxicity, coagulopathy, muscle breakdown, and renal impairment, which without treatment can culminate in death.

Presynaptic neurotoxins in the venom cause paralysis by disrupting neurotransmitter release at the nerve terminal. Their effects are slow in onset, can take days to resolve, and are not readily reversed even with antivenom. Postsynaptic neurotoxins, by contrast, act more rapidly by competitively blocking acetylcholine receptors at the neuromuscular junction, and their effects are generally more amenable to reversal by timely antivenom administration. Clinically, patients often develop a descending flaccid paralysis; early ptosis is followed by facial weakness (dysarthria), bulbar involvement, dyspnoea, and ultimately respiratory paralysis and peripheral weakness.

Because neurotoxic effects may progress rapidly, severe envenoming can be fatal within about 45 minutes in extreme cases, although survival times are usually longer and depend on multiple factors, including venom dose, site of bite, and availability of treatment. Once advanced general or respiratory paralysis has developed, reversing it even with large doses of antivenom may be difficult; prolonged intubation and mechanical ventilation—sometimes for a week or more—may be required. Early recognition of neurotoxic signs and prompt administration of adequate antivenom are, therefore, critical.

Coagulopathy is caused by powerful procoagulant toxins that activate prothrombin, consuming major clotting factors including fibrinogen and resulting in defibrination and unclottable blood. Patients are thereby at increased risk of significant external bleeding from the bite site and potentially life‑threatening internal haemorrhage, particularly intracranial bleeding. Normalisation of coagulation parameters may take many hours even after circulating venom has been neutralised. Taipan procoagulants are among the most potent known from any snake venom, although some cases of inland taipan envenoming have demonstrated only mild coagulopathy.

No specific nephrotoxins have yet been isolated from inland taipan venom, but acute kidney injury is a recognised complication, often secondary to severe rhabdomyolysis. Myotoxins in the venom cause extensive muscle breakdown (myolysis), releasing myoglobin into the bloodstream; this pigment is excreted in the urine (myoglobinuria), which may appear reddish‑brown, and can severely damage renal tubules.

Common proximate causes of death in untreated or inadequately treated bites include primary or secondary paralysis (e.g. respiratory failure, sometimes complicated by pneumonia), coagulopathy and haemorrhage (e.g. cerebral haemorrhage), kidney failure and associated complications such as sepsis, anaphylaxis in previously sensitised individuals, and cardiac complications, which are usually secondary to other systemic effects.

=== Antivenom ===
Until 1955, the only snake antivenom widely available in Australia was monovalent tiger snake (Notechis) antivenom, which provided partial cross‑protection against bites from several other species. Subsequently, additional specific antivenoms were developed, including one for the coastal taipan, followed by a polyvalent antivenom intended for use when the biting species is unknown.

The coastal taipan antivenom, commonly referred to simply as "taipan antivenom", is also effective against inland taipan venom, although some evidence suggests that it may be somewhat less effective in inland taipan cases than in bites from coastal taipans, possibly because of differences in venom composition.

Taipan antivenom used in Australia is produced through a long‑running antivenom programme involving the Australian Reptile Park, whose staff collect venom from captive snakes, and Commonwealth Serum Laboratories in Melbourne, which purifies and manufactures the equine‑derived antivenom for clinical use.
