= Hartley's Crocodile Adventures =

Hartley’s Crocodile Adventures
- Interactive map of Hartley’s Crocodile Adventures
- 16°39′47″S 145°33′52″E
- Date opened: 2002 (Current site)
- Location: Captain Cook Highway, Wangetti, Queensland, Australia
- Land area: 10 ha (25 acres)
- Website: www.crocodileadventures.com

Hartley's Crocodile Adventures is a 10-hectare (25-acre) wildlife sanctuary and ecotourism park located between Cairns and Port Douglas at Wangetti in Far North Queensland, Australia. It adjoins the world heritage listed Wet Tropics of Queensland rainforest, through which visitors can take guided or self-guided walks.

== Crocodile farm ==
The park incorporates a commercial crocodile farm that breeds and raises saltwater crocodiles for their skins and meat.

== Animals ==
Some of the species which live at the park include:

Reptiles

- Saltwater crocodile
- Freshwater crocodile
- American alligator
- Komodo dragon
- Lace monitor
- Pilbara rock monitor
- Gila monster
- Fiji crested iguana
- Rhinoceros iguana
- Philippine sailfin lizard
- Eastern water dragon
- Central bearded dragon
- Frill-neck lizard
- Veiled chameleon
- Madagascan giant day gecko
- Eastern blue-tongued lizard
- Northern red-throated skink
- Radiated tortoise
- Indian star tortoise
- Carolina box turtle
- Chinese three-striped box turtle
- Krefft's eastern short-neck turtle
- Reticulated python
- Burmese python
- Boa constrictor
- Amethystine python
- Carpet python
- Green tree python
- Blood python
- Western diamondback rattlesnake
- Monocled cobra
- Corn snake
- Desert death adder
- Tiger snake
- Coastal taipan
- Fierce snake
- Red-bellied black snake

Amphibians

- Australian green tree frog
- Dyeing poison dart frog

Mammals

- Koala
- Bare-nosed wombat
- Eastern grey kangaroo
- Antilopine wallaroo
- Swamp wallaby
- Red-legged pademelon

Birds

- Southern cassowary
- Emu
- Barn owl
- Tawny frogmouth
- Laughing kookaburra
- Jabiru
- Nankeen night heron
- Sulphur-crested cockatoo
- Eclectus parrot

== See also ==
- Cairns Tropical Zoo
