= Paradoxin =

Neurotoxic phospholipase

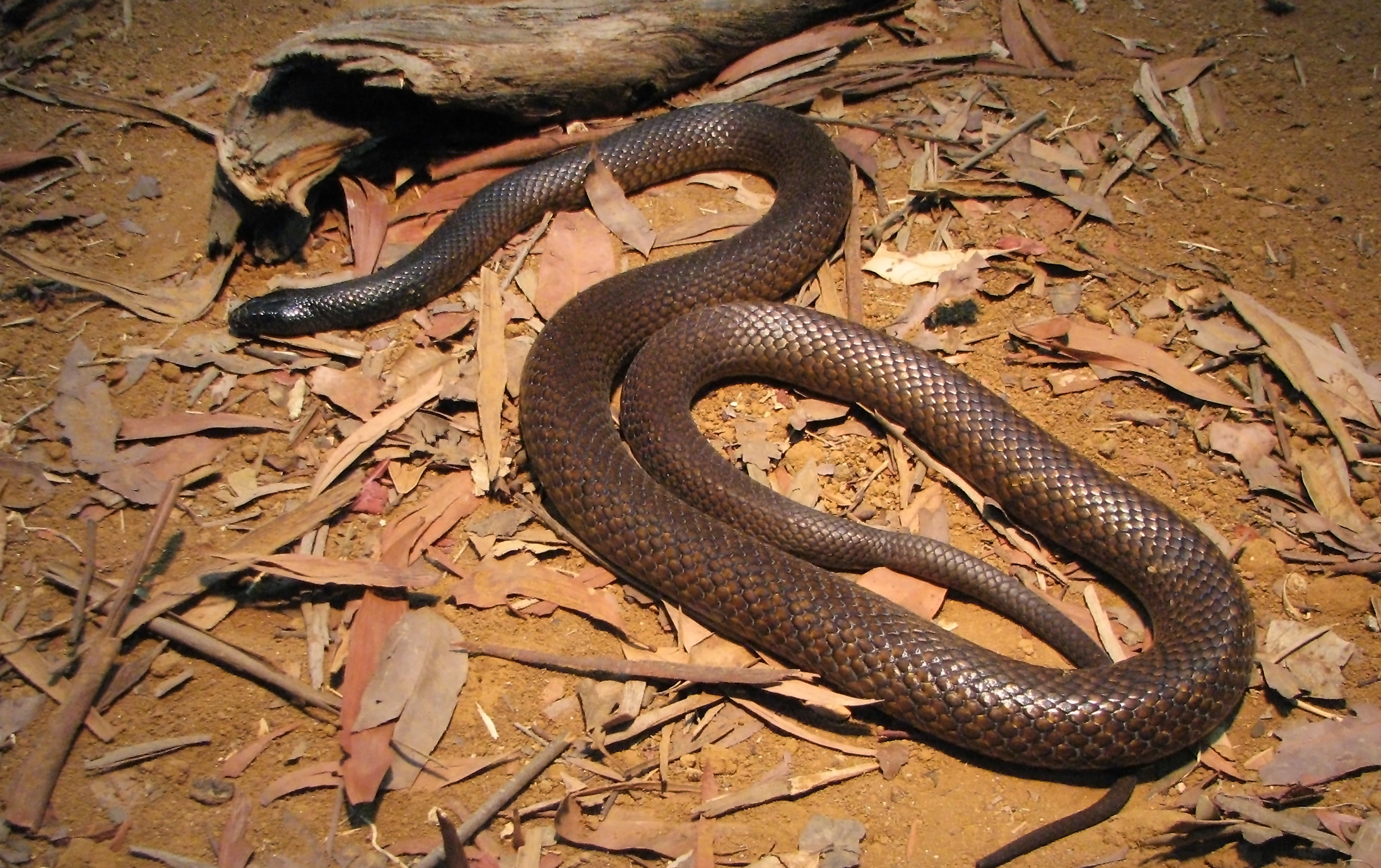
The Inland taipan produces paradoxin in its venom

Paradoxin (PDX) is a presynaptic neurotoxic phospholipase found in the venom of the inland taipan (Oxyuranus microlepidotus), an extremely venomous species of snake native to Australia.

== Structure ==
It is similar in structure to another neurotoxin named taipoxin. However they differ in how they are neurotoxic. It is a heterotrimer and composed of three subunits.

== Toxicity ==
Relatively little is known about paradoxin including its neuromuscular activity. It is known that paradoxin blocks nerve impulses in the synapses by disrupting and blocking neuromuscular transmission.
