= Cairns Tropical Zoo =

- Cairns Tropical Zoo logo
- Interactive map of Cairns Tropical Zoo
- 16.7581°S 145.6627°E
- Date opened: 1980
- Date closed: March 2016
- Location: Cairns, Queensland, Australia
- Land area: 6 ha (15 acres)
- Memberships: Zoo and Aquarium Association
- Website: www.cairnstropicalzoo.com.au

Cairns Tropical Zoo was a 6-hectare (15-acre) tropical zoo in Cairns, Queensland, Australia. It had a small collection of native and introduced species, and was a member of the Zoo and Aquarium Association. It was owned by the Freeman family.

The zoo opened in 1980 in a tranquil bushland area and grew to have the largest collection of animals in Far North Queensland. By 2015, the site was surrounded by suburbs and the zoo became a nuisance to local residents.

The zoo closed on 31 March 2016 with the land sold to a local developer. Many of the animals were relocated to other zoos and wildlife parks also operated by the Freeman family, including Hartley's Crocodile Adventures, Kuranda Koala Gardens and Birdworld Kuranda with $2 million being spent on creating new exhibits.
