= Reptile Gardens =

Zoo in South Dakota, U.S.

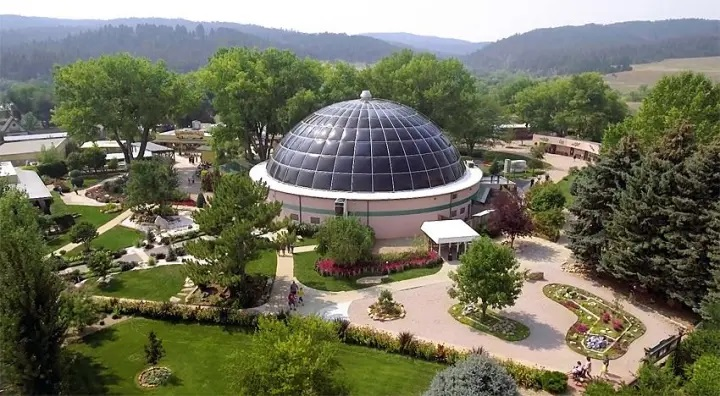
- Aerial view of the Sky Dome
- Interactive map of Reptile Gardens
- 43.9903599°N 103.2716882°W
- Date opened: June 3, 1937
- Location: Rapid City, South Dakota, United States
- Annual visitors: 250,000–300,000 (2012)
- Website: www.reptilegardens.com

Reptile Gardens is a reptile-focused zoo south of Rapid City, South Dakota, on US 16 between Rapid City and Mount Rushmore. The park is open from the first Saturday of March through November 30 each year. Reptile Gardens was certified in the 2014 and 2018 editions of Guinness World Records as the world's largest reptile zoo.

== History ==
Reptile Gardens was founded by 21-year-old reptile enthusiast Earl Brockelsby and officially opened on June 3, 1937. Brockelsby chose the site at the top of a long hill, hoping motorists would stop in the parking lot to fix their overheated vehicles. He received a $400 loan from a bank and used it to dig a hole in the ground, in which he placed various local animals—mostly snakes—he caught in the wild. Using the initial profits, Brockelsby constructed a stone building over a second pit; one pit hosted venomous species, and the other non-venomous.

Reptile Gardens went through difficult times in the 1940s while Brockelsby was serving with the Army in Europe. Regaining momentum after World War II, the 1950s saw an increase in visitation to the Black Hills. During that time, Brockelsby expanded and purchased a dozen Nile crocodiles and Methuselah, a long-lived giant tortoise. In 1950, Brockelsby hired Earl Chace, former curator of the Bronx Zoo, as the curator for Reptile Gardens. Chace served as curator until 1968 and from 1969 to 1979 as curator emeritus.

Reptile Gardens moved to its current location in 1965. On August 22, 1976, an electrical fire broke out and destroyed the Sky Dome, killing most of the animals inside. The dome was rebuilt in 1977.

After Brockelsby's death in 1993, his family continued to operate the zoo.

In 2014, Guinness World Records certified Reptile Gardens as the world's largest reptile zoo. The park was re-certified and included in the 2018 edition, as well as in Guinness World Records: Amazing Animals.

== Description and exhibits ==
In 2012, the park had an estimated 250,000 to 300,000 annual visitors.

=== Sky Dome ===
The Sky Dome is an indoor jungle that opened in 1965 as a new addition to Reptile Gardens. Named after the large domed skylight in the ceiling, at the time of its construction, it was the largest plastic dome created using the Systems Abstracta design.

The Sky Dome was rebuilt in 1976 after a fire that destroyed everything except the Ponderosa Pine skeleton, which stands as the centerpiece of the Safari Room on the main level. The new Sky Dome was opened in 1977.

=== Other exhibits ===
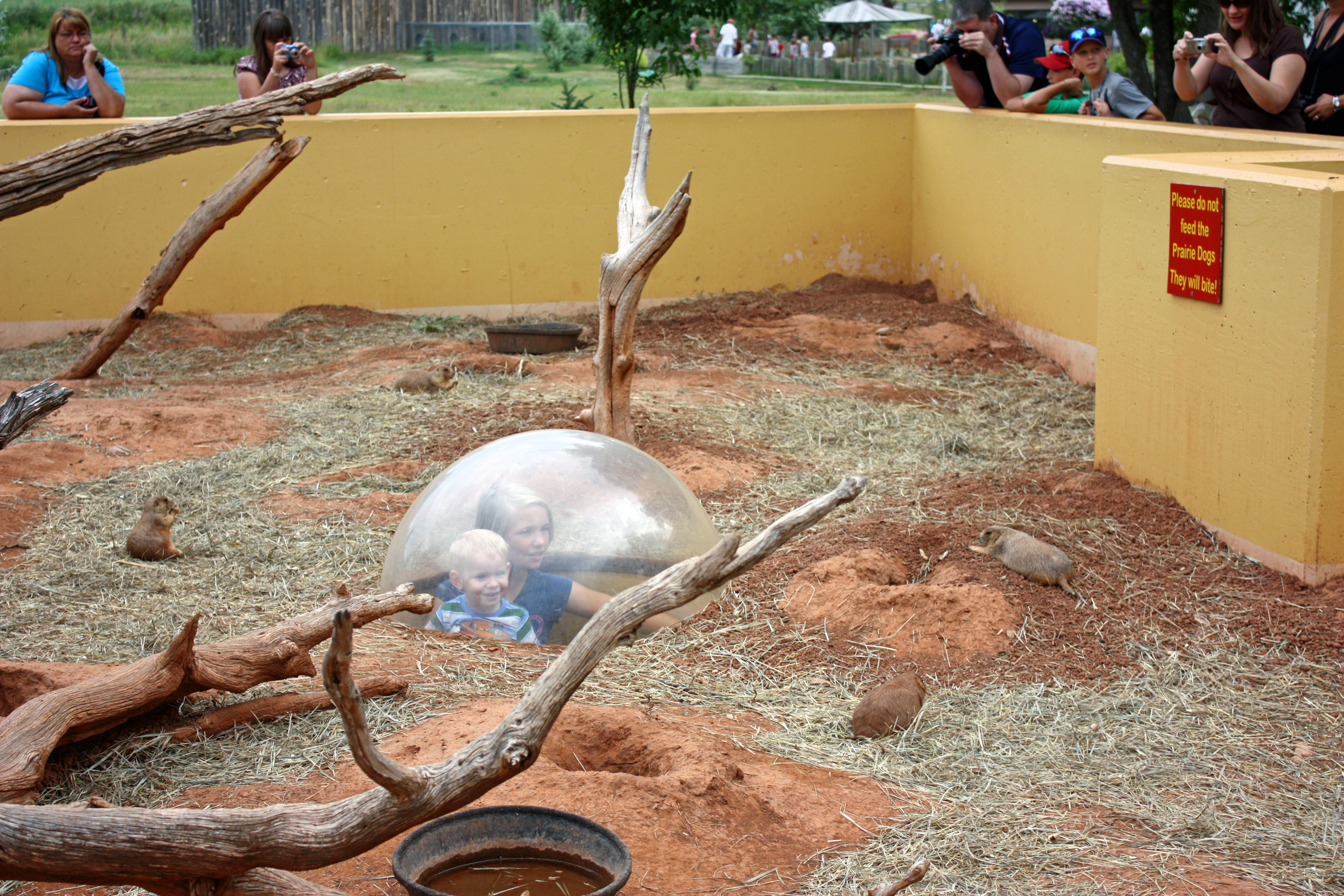
Prairie Dog town

Reptile Gardens has several exhibits, including:

- Prairie Dog Town
- Snake Program
- Bird Program
- Alligator/Crocodile Show
- Bald Eagle Exhibit
- Sky Dome
- Safari Room
- Komodo Dragon
- Tortuga Falls Meditative Garden
- Living Wall
- Giant Tortoise Yard

The Bewitched Village featured farm animals, such as cows, pigs, and ducks, set against the backdrop of a Wild West ghost town.

== Animals ==
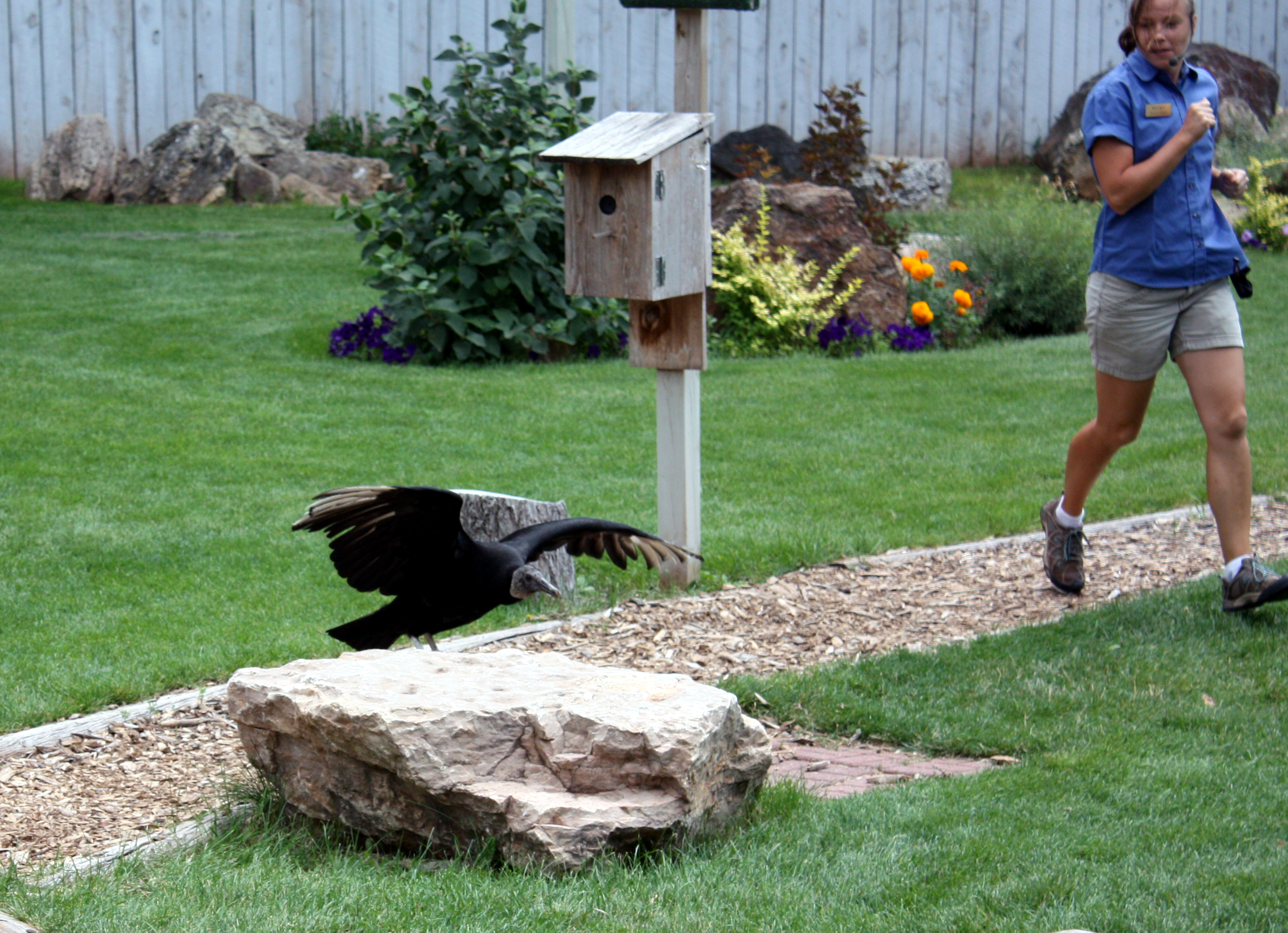
Bird program

During the summer, Reptile Gardens offers educational and interactive animal shows, such as a bird program, an alligator/crocodile show, and a snake program. During performances, the animal keepers discuss safety techniques, facts, and conservation efforts to aid in species survival.

=== Methuselah ===
Methuselah was a long-lived 500-pound (230 kg) Galápagos tortoise that lived at Reptile Gardens from December 1954 until his death on July 9, 2011. He was born in the Galápagos Islands in 1881. Earl Brockelsby purchased Methuselah from a reptile dealer in Florida and subsequently transported the tortoise by train to South Dakota. Methuselah became a star attraction and mascot; child guests were sometimes allowed to ride on his shell. At the time of his death, he was 130 years old. Reptile Gardens estimates that Methuselah may have come into contact with as many as 12 million visitors during his 56 years at the park.

On July 10, 2012, Reptile Gardens dedicated a new playground, called Methuselah's Playground, and included a bronze replica of the tortoise.

== Conservation and research ==
Reptile Gardens donates to various environmental conservation organizations, including the Charles Darwin Center in the Galapagos Islands.

== Awards ==
Reptile Gardens has received a number of local, state, regional, and national awards in recent decades. Some of these awards include:

- USA Today Readers Choice Award, Best Attraction in South Dakota - 2017
- Heritage Award, Prairie Family Business Assn. - 2017
- SBA Family-Owned Business of the Year for South Dakota - 2010
- Prairie Family Business Assn. Family Business of the Year – 2009
- Tom Didier Excellence in Family Business Award – 2008
- USA Today Top 10 Roadside Attractions In The Country – 2001
- South Dakota Governors Service Award for Outstanding Commitment to Hospitality and Education in the Visitor Industry – 2003-2011
- Midwest Travel Writers Association Gemmy Award – 1995
- George S. Mickelson Award for Great Service to South Dakota Visitors - 1994
- AAA GEM Designation Attraction

Founder Earl Brockelsby received the Ben Black Elk Award for lifetime achievement in promoting South Dakota tourism in 1982. His son, John Brockelsby, Public Relations Director, received the same award in 2015.

== See also ==
- The Reptile Zoo
