= Aipysurus duboisii =

Conservation status
- Least Concern (IUCN 3.1)

Scientific classification
- Kingdom: Animalia
- Phylum: Chordata
- Class: Reptilia
- Order: Squamata
- Suborder: Serpentes
- Family: Elapidae
- Genus: Aipysurus
- Species: A. duboisii

Binomial name
- Aipysurus duboisii Bavay, 1869

Synonyms
- Aipysurus australis Sauvage, 1877 Pelagophis lubricus W. Peters & Doria, 1878

Species of snake

Aipysurus duboisii, also known commonly as Dubois' sea snake and the reef shallows sea snake, is a species of extremely venomous snake in the subfamily Hydrophiinae of the family Elapidae. Its geographic range includes Papua New Guinea, New Caledonia, and the northern, eastern, and western coastal areas of Australia, that is the Coral Sea, Arafura Sea, Timor Sea, and Indian Ocean. It lives to depths of 80 m (262 ft) in coral reef flats, sandy and silty sediments, which contain seaweed, invertebrates and corals or sponges that can serve as shelter. It preys upon moray eels and various fish that live on the seafloor, up to 110 cm (3.6 ft) in size. A. duboisii is viviparous, giving birth to live young rather than laying eggs. It displays medium aggressiveness, i.e., will bite if provoked, but not spontaneously. The fangs are 1.8 mm long, which are relatively short for a snake, and the venom yield is 0.43 mg. Aipysurus duboisii is a crepuscular species, meaning that it is most active at dawn and dusk.

It is the most venomous sea snake, and one of the top three most venomous snakes in the world.

== Etymology ==
The specific name, duboisii, is in honor of Belgian naturalist Charles Frédéric Dubois.

== Description ==
Adults of A. duboisii grow up to 148 cm (4.86 ft) in total length (including tail), but usually to around 80 cm (2.6 ft). The head is slightly wider than the neck with nostrils on its upper part and nasals contacting each other. Eyes are separated from supralabial scales by a row of large subocular scales. Dorsal scales are usually smooth, but sometimes have a small keel or small knobs. Individuals vary significantly in color and body pattern. The tail is relatively long; the chin and throat have lighter color than rest of the body.

== Venom ==
The acute toxicity of snake venom is conventionally tested on laboratory animals and is evaluated in terms of the median lethal dose (LD_{50}), that is, the dose required to kill half the members of a tested population divided by the weight of the tested animal. The LD_{50} depends on the animal. Rabbits are about twice as sensitive to sea snake venom as mice, and fish and frogs are even more susceptible. The LD_{50} for subcutaneous injection of A. duboisii venom into mice is 0.044 mg/kg of body weight. This makes A. duboisii the most venomous sea snake tested, and the third-most venomous snake overall, behind the inland taipan (Oxyuranus microlepidotus, LD_{50}=0.025 mg/kg) and the eastern brown snake (Pseudonaja textilis, LD_{50}=0.036 mg/kg).

== See also ==
- Snakebite

== Bibliography ==
- Heatwole, Harold (1999). Sea Snakes. Australian Natural History Series. Sydney: University of New South Wales Press. 148 pp. ISBN 0-86840-776-3.
