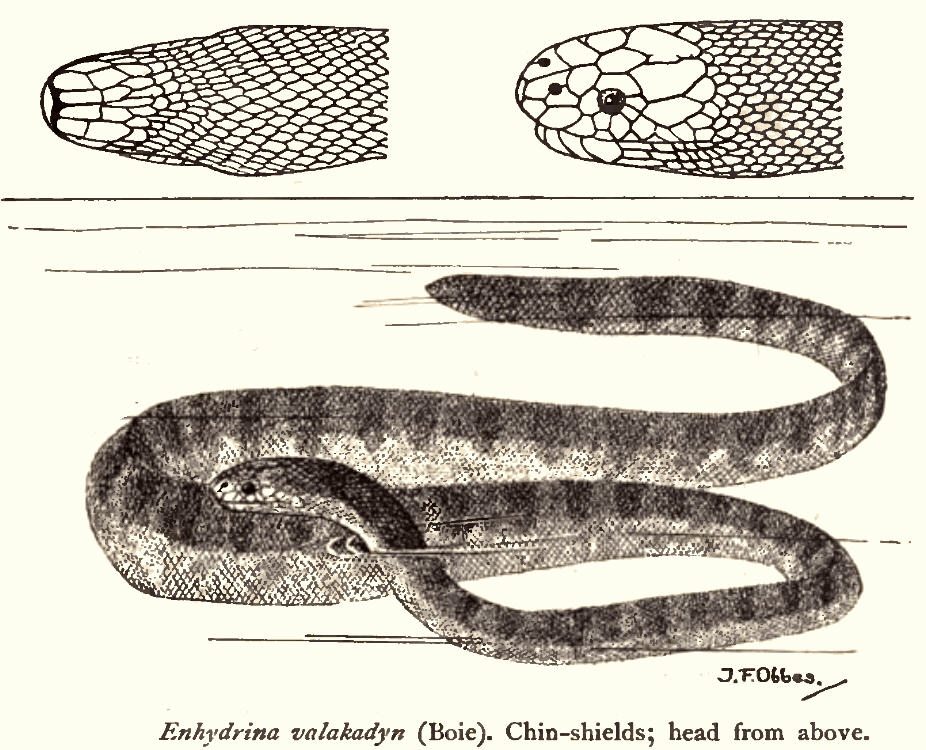

Conservation status
- Least Concern (IUCN 3.1)

Scientific classification
- Kingdom: Animalia
- Phylum: Chordata
- Class: Reptilia
- Order: Squamata
- Suborder: Serpentes
- Family: Elapidae
- Genus: Hydrophis
- Species: H. schistosus

Binomial name
- Hydrophis schistosus (Daudin, 1803)

Synonyms
- Disteira schistosa (Daudin, 1803); Enhydrina schistosa (Daudin, 1803); Hydrophis schistosus (Daudin, 1803); Hydrus valakadyn Boie, 1827

= Hydrophis schistosus =

Species of snake

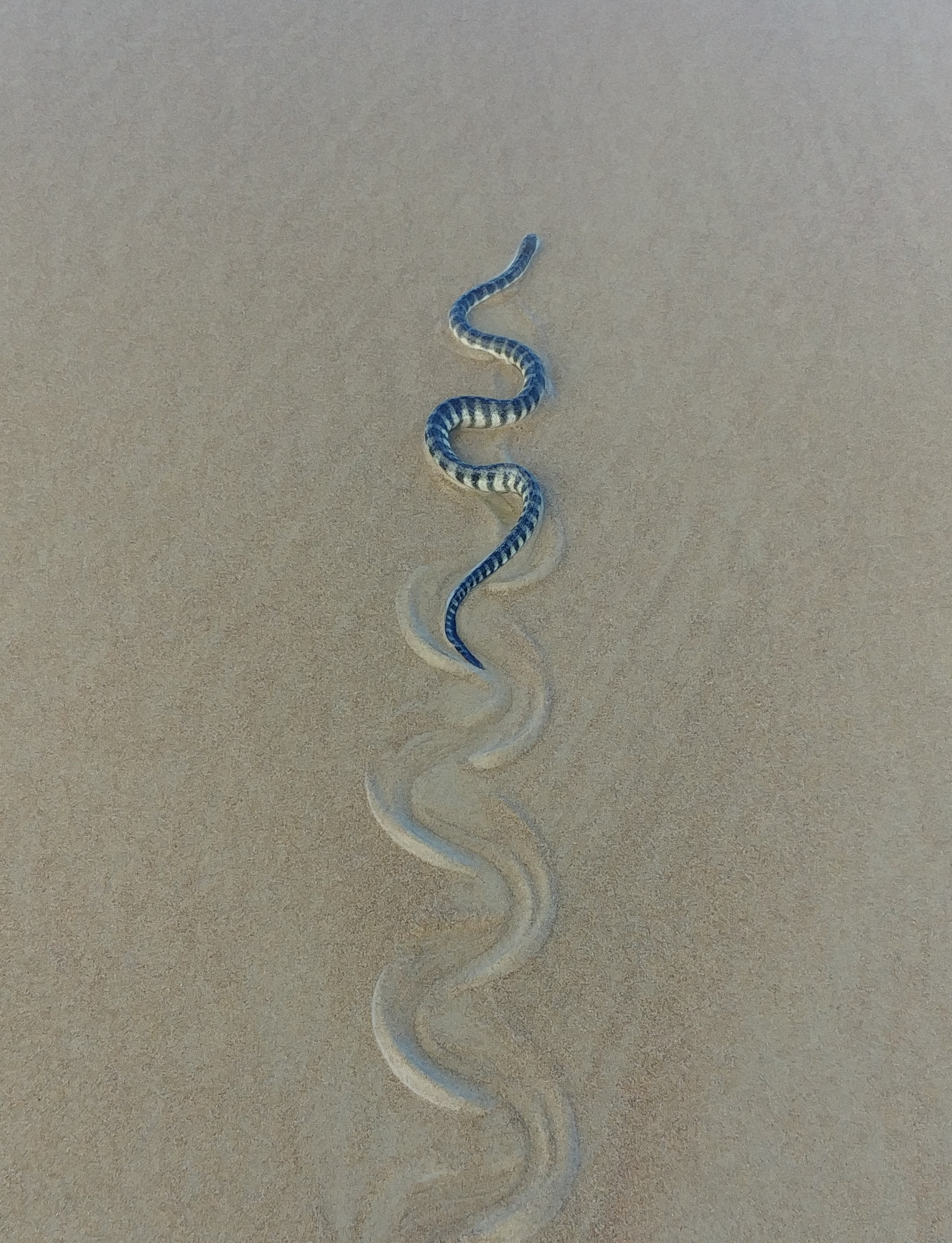
A hook-nosed sea snake seen on Arossim Beach, South Goa, India. This snake was found in a fishing net and later released to the sea.

Hydrophis schistosus, commonly known as the beaked sea snake, hook-nosed sea snake, common sea snake, or the Valakadeyan sea snake, is a highly venomous species of sea snake common throughout the tropical Indo-Pacific. This species is implicated in more than 50% of all bites caused by sea snakes, as well as the majority of envenomings and fatalities.

== Description ==
The rostral scale is longer than broad, and is in contact with four shields; frontal more long than broad, shorter than the parietals; nasals in contact with the two anterior labials; sometimes partially divided; one pre- and one or two postoculars; temporals l–3; seven or eight upper labials, fourth or third and fourth entering the eye, the last sometimes divided; anterior chin-shields rather indistinct, separated. Scales with a tubercle or keel, in 50–70 rows; ventrals 230–314, slightly enlarged. The snake is usually uniformly dark grey above; sides and lower parts whitish. Young specimens olive or grey with black transverse bands, broadest in the middle. Length of head and body 1110 mm; tail 190 mm.

The name Vala Kadiyan is from the Tamil word and valakadyn in Malayalam meaning net biter.

== Distribution ==
It is found in the Arabian Sea and Persian Gulf (Bahrain, Iran, Iraq, Kuwait, Oman, Qatar, Saudi Arabia and United Arab Emirates), south of the Seychelles and Madagascar, the seas off South Asia (Pakistan, India (coasts from Gujarat to West Bengal and Andaman & Nicobar Island), Sri Lanka and Bangladesh), Southeast Asia (Myanmar, Thailand, Vietnam).

Snakes from Australia (Northern Territory and Queensland) and New Guinea are now provisionally identified as Enhydrina zweifeli, due to DNA tests that have shown they are not related to Enhydrina schistosa.

== Habitat and behavior ==
These snakes are generally found in the coast and coastal islands of India. They are amongst the most common of the 20 kinds of sea snakes found in that region.

They are active both during the day and at night. They are able to dive up to 100 m and stay underwater for a maximum of five hours before resurfacing. Sea snakes are equipped with glands to eliminate excess salt. They are venomous and notably aggressive, with some herpetologists describing them as "cantankerous and savage". About 1.5 milligrams of its venom is estimated to be lethal.

Their principal food is fish.

== Venom ==
The venom of this species is made up of highly potent neurotoxins and myotoxins. This widespread species is responsible for the vast majority of deaths from sea snake bites (up to 90% of all sea snake bites). The LD_{50} value is 0.1125 mg/kg based on toxicology studies. The average venom yield per bite is approximately 7.9–9.0 mg, while the lethal human dose is estimated to be 1.5 mg.
