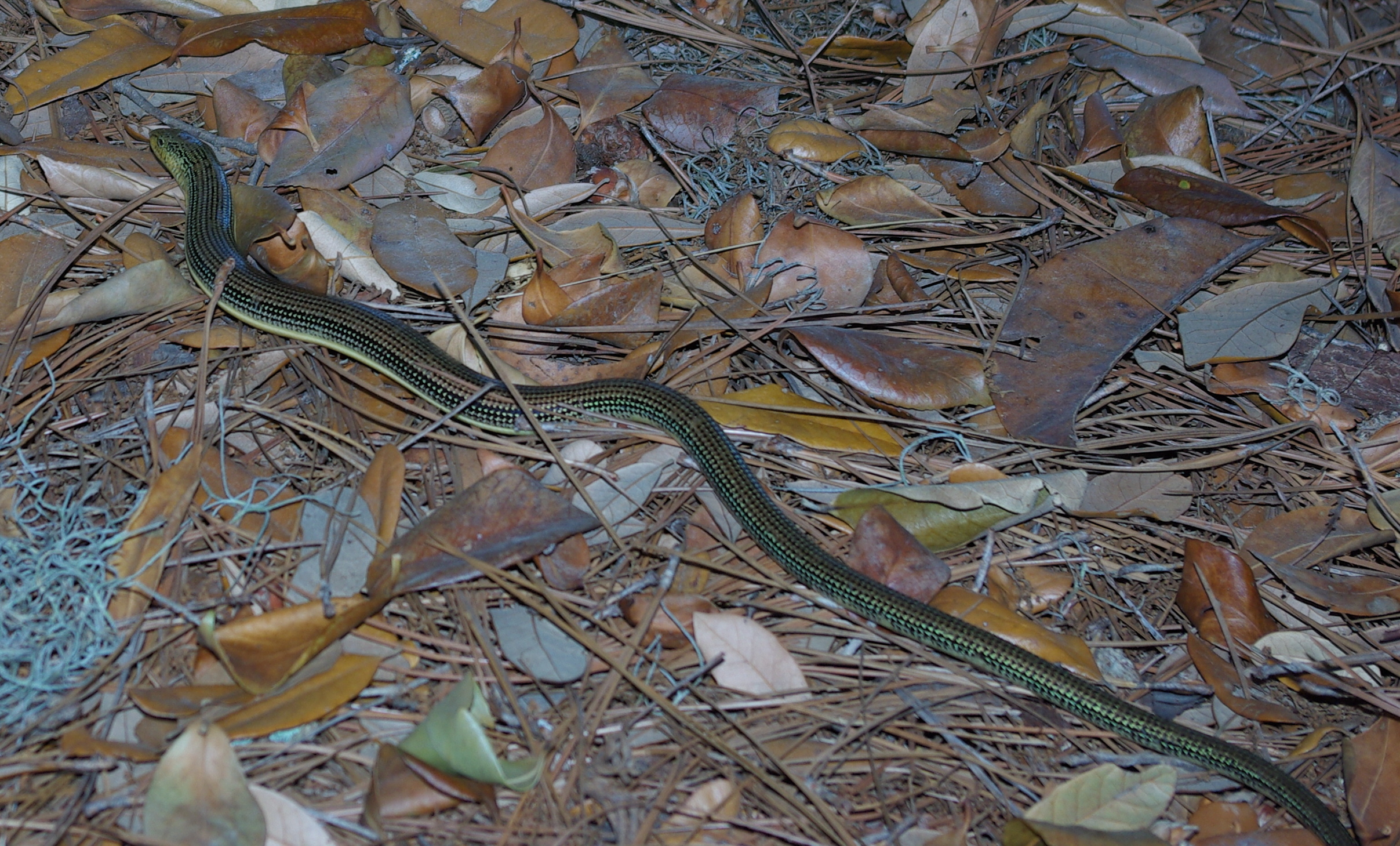
- Eastern glass lizard (Ophisaurus ventralis)

Scientific classification
- Kingdom: Animalia
- Phylum: Chordata
- Class: Reptilia
- Order: Squamata
- Suborder: Anguimorpha
- Family: Anguidae
- Subfamily: Anguinae
- Genus: Ophisaurus; Daudin, 1803

Type species
- Anguis ventralis Linnaeus, 1766

Species
- See text

= Ophisaurus =

Ophisaurus Temporal range: Eocene–Recent

Genus of lizards

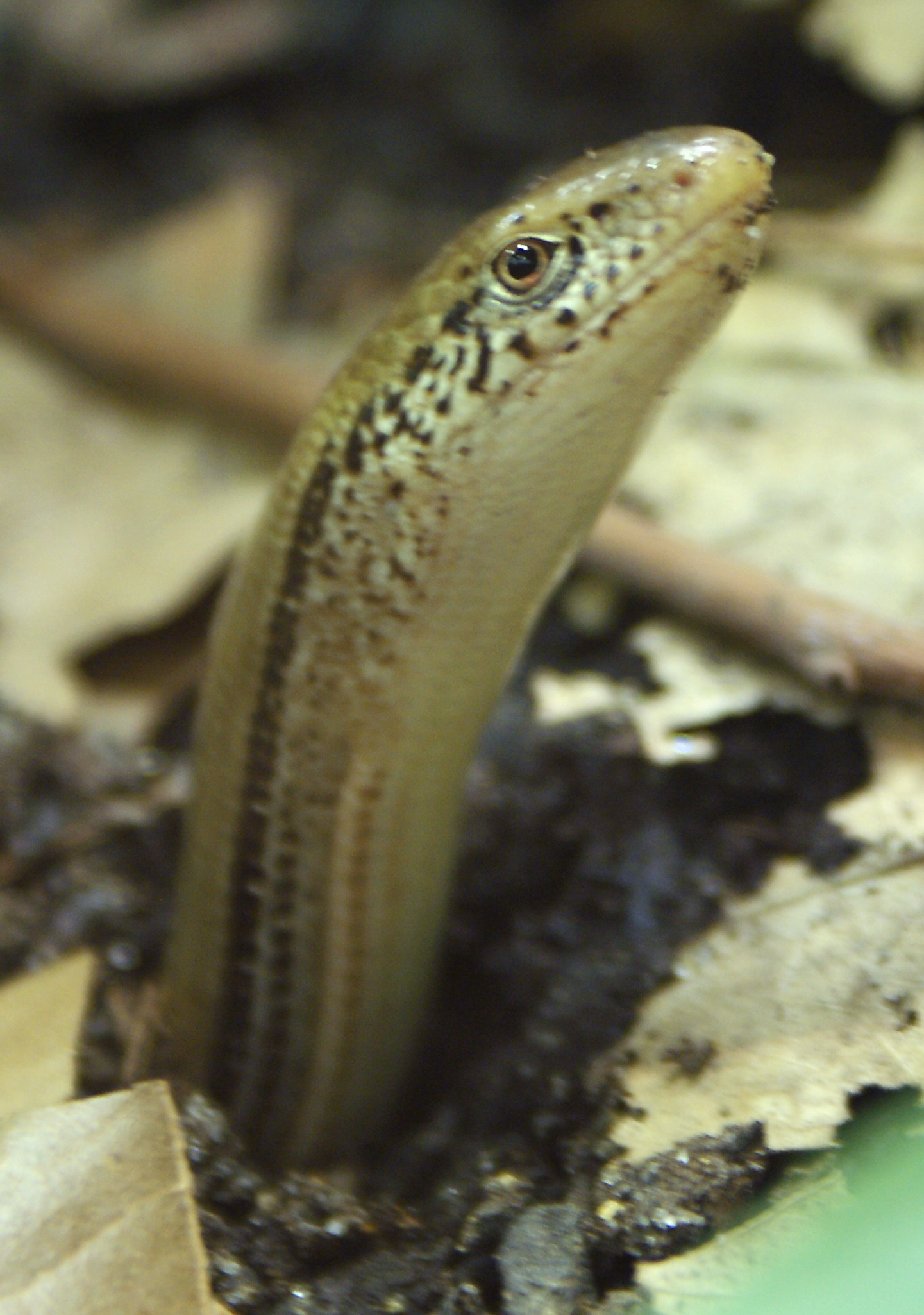
Slender glass lizard (Ophisaurus attenuatus)

Ophisaurus (from the Greek 'snake-lizard') is a genus of superficially snake-like legless lizards in the subfamily Anguinae. Known as joint snakes, glass snakes, or glass lizards, they are so-named because their tails are easily broken; like many lizards, they have the ability to deter predation by dropping off part of the tail, which can break into several pieces, like glass. The tail remains mobile, distracting the predator, while the lizard becomes motionless, allowing eventual escape. This represents a significant loss of body mass; the tail can grow back, but may take years to do so. The new tail is usually smaller than the original.

Although most species have no legs, their head shapes, movable eyelids, and external ear openings identify them as lizards. A few species have very small, stub-like legs near their rear vents. These are vestigial organs, meaning they once served an evolved purpose but are no longer used. They reach lengths of up to 1.2 metres (4 ft), but about two-thirds of this is the tail. Glass lizards feed on insects, spiders, other small reptiles, and young rodents. Their diets are limited by their inability to unhinge their jaws. Some glass lizards give birth to live young but most lay eggs.

== Feeding ==
Their diets consist primarily of arthropods, with larger animals eating snails and small mammals.

== Species ==
The genus Ophisaurus (sensu lato) contains two monophyletic sister clades, one native to North America, the other to Asia, the latter is sometimes treated as the separate genus Dopasia.

Nota bene: In the list below, a binomial authority in parentheses indicates that the species was originally described in a genus other than Ophisaurus.

- Ophisaurus sensu stricto: (native to North America)
  - Ophisaurus attenuatus Baird, 1880 – slender glass lizard
  - Ophisaurus ceroni Holman, 1965 – Ceron's glass lizard
  - Ophisaurus compressus Cope, 1900 – island glass lizard
  - Ophisaurus incomptus McConkey, 1955 – plainneck glass lizard
  - Ophisaurus mimicus Palmer, 1987 – mimic glass lizard
  - Ophisaurus ventralis (Linnaeus, 1766) – eastern glass lizard
- Ophisaurus/Dopasia (native to Asia)
  - Ophisaurus buettikoferi (Lidth De Jeude, 1905) – Buettikofer's glass lizard
  - Ophisaurus gracilis (Gray, 1845) – Burmese glass lizard, Asian glass lizard, Indian glass snake
  - Ophisaurus hainanensis (Yang, 1984) – Hainan glass lizard
  - Ophisaurus harti (Boulenger, 1899) – Hart's glass lizard
  - Ophisaurus ludovici (Mocquard, 1905) – Ludovic's glass lizard
  - Ophisaurus sokolovi (Darevsky & Nguyen, 1983) – Sokolov's glass lizard
  - Ophisaurus wegneri (Mertens, 1959) – Wegner's glass lizard

Hyalosaurus from North Africa has also been included within the concept of Ophisaurus sensu lato, but genetic evidence has shown them to be more closely related to Anguis and Pseudopus.

=== Fossil record ===
Ophisaurus sensu lato was widely distributed in Europe, first appearing there during the Eocene, with its distribution at its maximum extent during the Miocene, their range had contracted to the Mediterranean by the late Pliocene. The youngest records of Ophisaurus in Europe are from southern Spain, dating to the Early-Mid Pleistocene transition around 800,000 years ago. The decline was likely caused by decreasing temperatures and increasing aridity due to the onset of glaciation. Ophisaurus sensu lato likely dispersed into Asia from Europe before dispersing from Asia into North America via Beringia. The oldest records of Ophisaurus in North America are from the late Miocene.

== See also ==
- American legless lizard
- Pygopodidae
- Slowworm
- Limbless vertebrates
