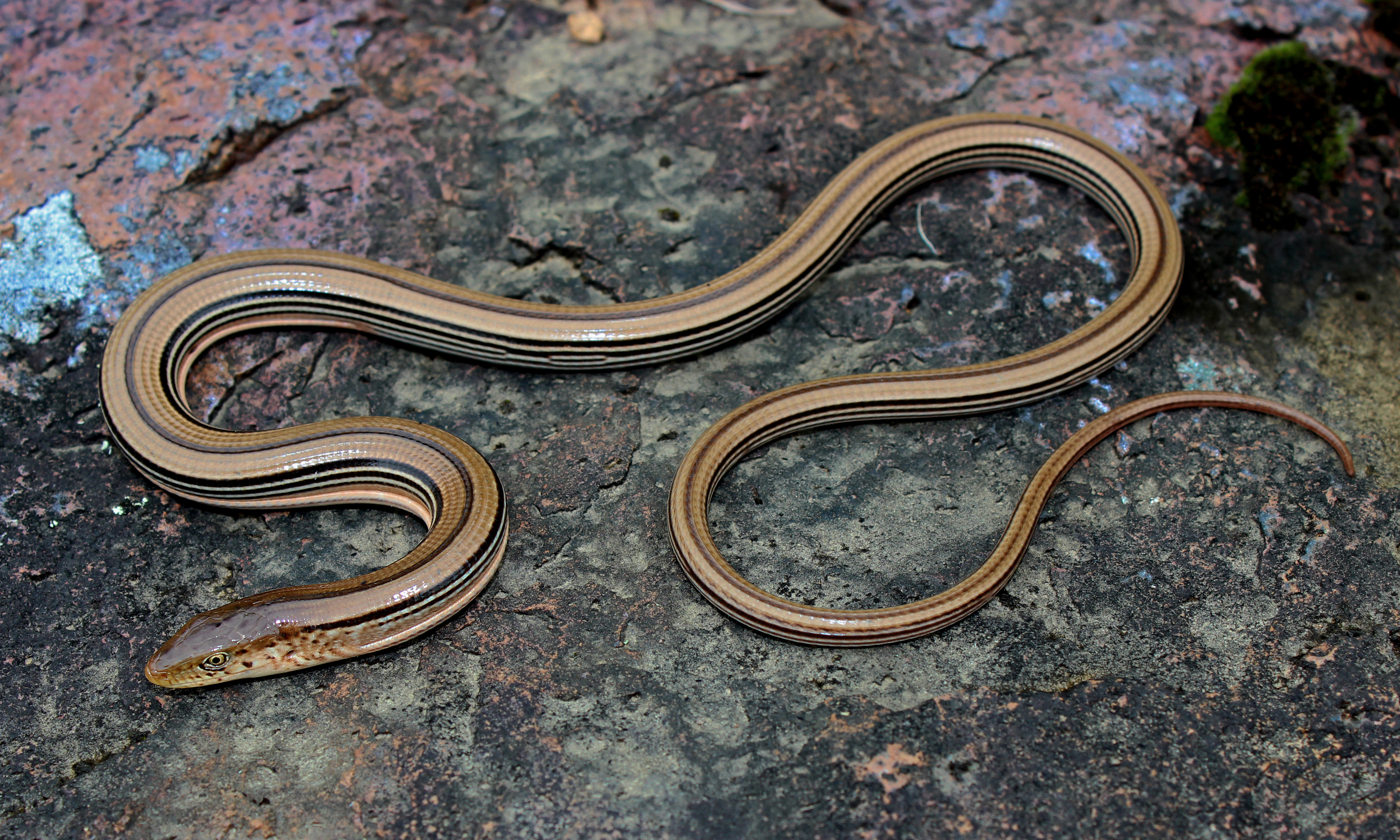

Conservation status
- Least Concern (IUCN 3.1)

Scientific classification
- Kingdom: Animalia
- Phylum: Chordata
- Class: Reptilia
- Order: Squamata
- Suborder: Anguimorpha
- Family: Anguidae
- Genus: Ophisaurus
- Species: O. attenuatus

Binomial name
- Ophisaurus attenuatus Baird in Cope, 1880
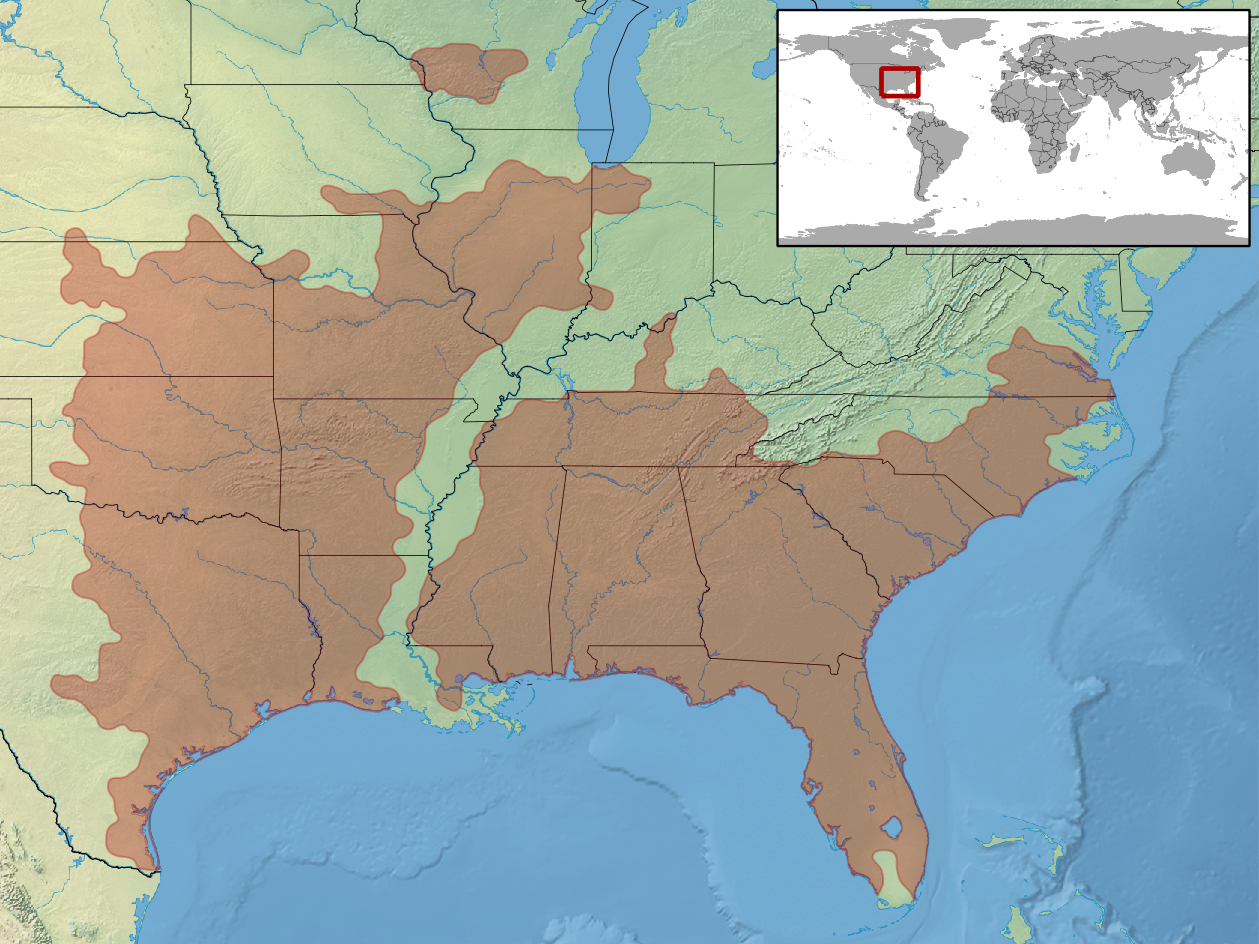

Synonyms
- Ophisaurus ventralis attenuatus Baird in Cope, 1880

= Slender glass lizard =

Species of reptile

The slender glass lizard (Ophisaurus attenuatus) is a legless lizard in the glass lizard subfamily (Anguinae). The species is endemic to the United States. Two subspecies are recognized. The lizard was originally believed to be a subspecies of the eastern glass lizard (Ophisaurus ventralis). Their name comes from their easily broken tail which they can break off themselves without ever being touched. It is difficult to find a specimen with an undamaged tail. The lizard eats a variety of insects and small animals, including smaller lizards. Snakes and other animals are known to prey on the species. Humans have a part in destroying their environment and killing their food supply with insecticides. The lizard is considered to be a least-concern species according to the International Union for Conservation of Nature (IUCN), though it is vulnerable in Iowa and endangered in Wisconsin. The streamlined, legless species is often confused with snakes. Glass Lizards, however, differ from snakes as they possess a moveable eyelid, which is absent in snakes. Another way to distinguish glass lizards from snakes is the presence of an external ear opening, which are absent in snakes.

== Taxonomy ==
The species was originally believed by American herpetologist Edward Drinker Cope to be a subspecies of Ophisaurus ventralis in 1880 under the name Opheosaurus ventralis attenuatus. It was not until 1885 when the British herpetologist George Albert Boulenger recognized it to be its own species. However, Cope's belief influenced other herpetologists until 1949 when another American herpetologist Wilfred T. Neill expressed his belief that Boulenger was correct about it being a distinct species. The difference between this species with O. ventralis and other species in the genus is that the white spots on its dorsum are located on the posterior edges of its scales, with none of the spots being located mainly in middle of its scales. Another distinctive difference is that this species has 98 or more scales along its lateral fold. In the word Ophisaurus, orphis is Ancient Greek for serpent or reptile and saurus means lizard or reptile. The word attenuatus is Latin for "tapered, drawn out, thin".

=== Subspecies ===
- Western slender glass lizard, O. a. attenuatus Baird in Cope, 1880

The western slender glass lizard reaches an average of 0.66 m (26 in). It can be found in woods or dry rocky hillsides, in grass or the burrows of small mammals. The species can easily camouflage itself in tall grass because of its color.

- Eastern slender glass lizard, O. a. longicaudus McConkey, 1952

The males are larger than females with a longer head and tail. Males have more scales above their lateral fold and along the center of their back than females. Larger males have waxy white crossbars on their dorsum's anterior, which have an outline of black and are not present in smaller males and females.

== Description ==
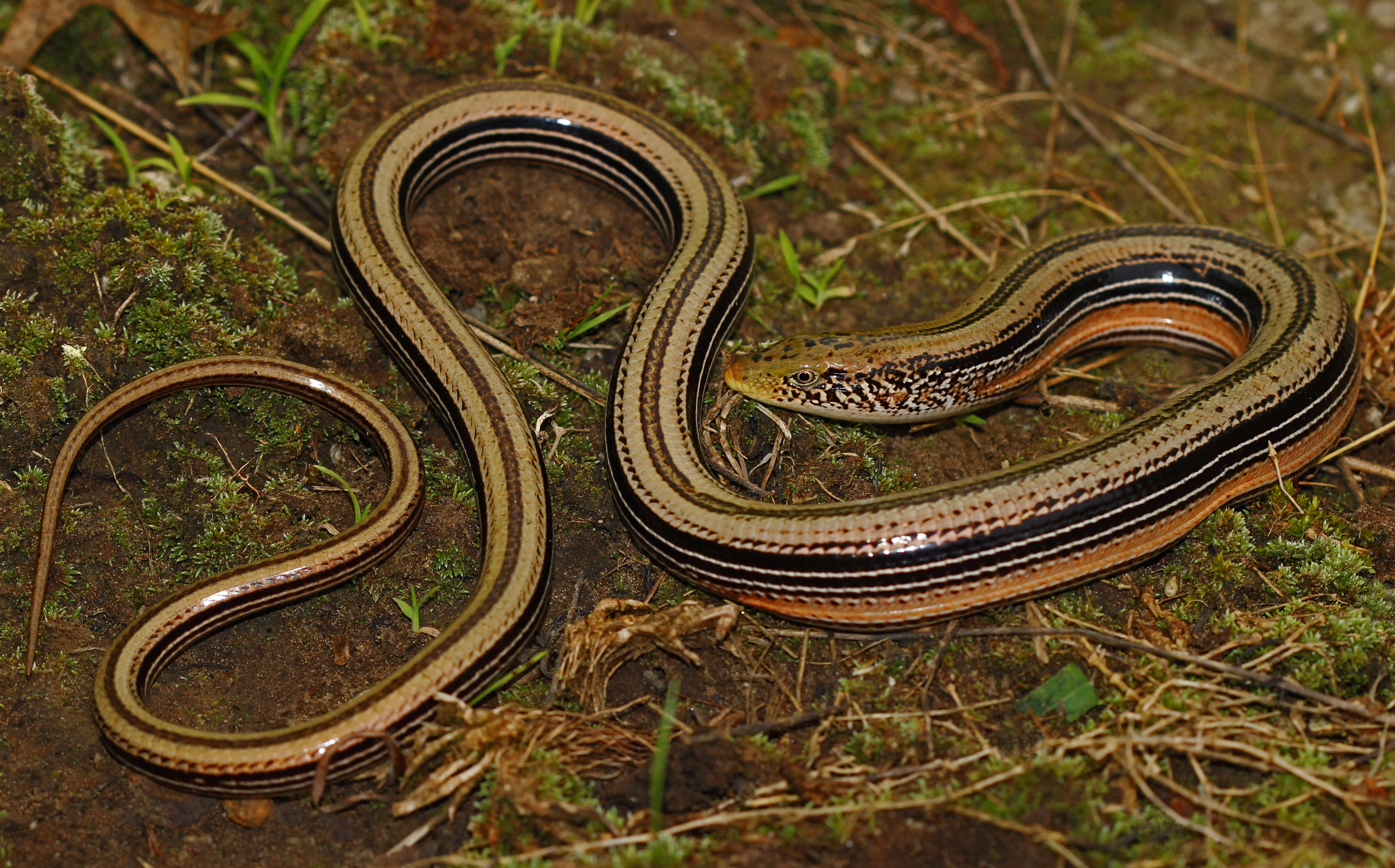
Western slender glass lizard (Ophisaurus attenuatus attenuatus), Vernon County, Missouri (14 June 2019)

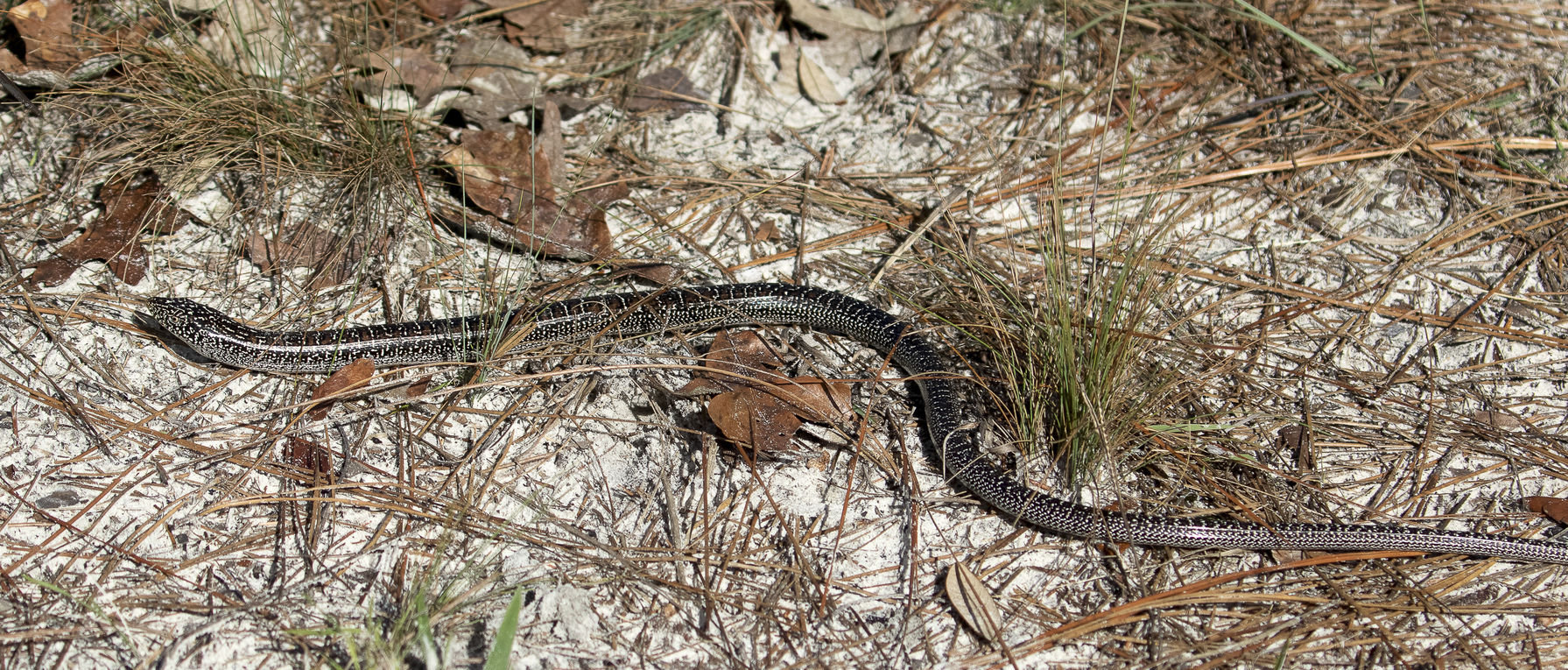
Eastern slender glass lizard (Ophisaurus attenuatus longicaudus), Gilchrist County, Florida (29 Mar 2021)

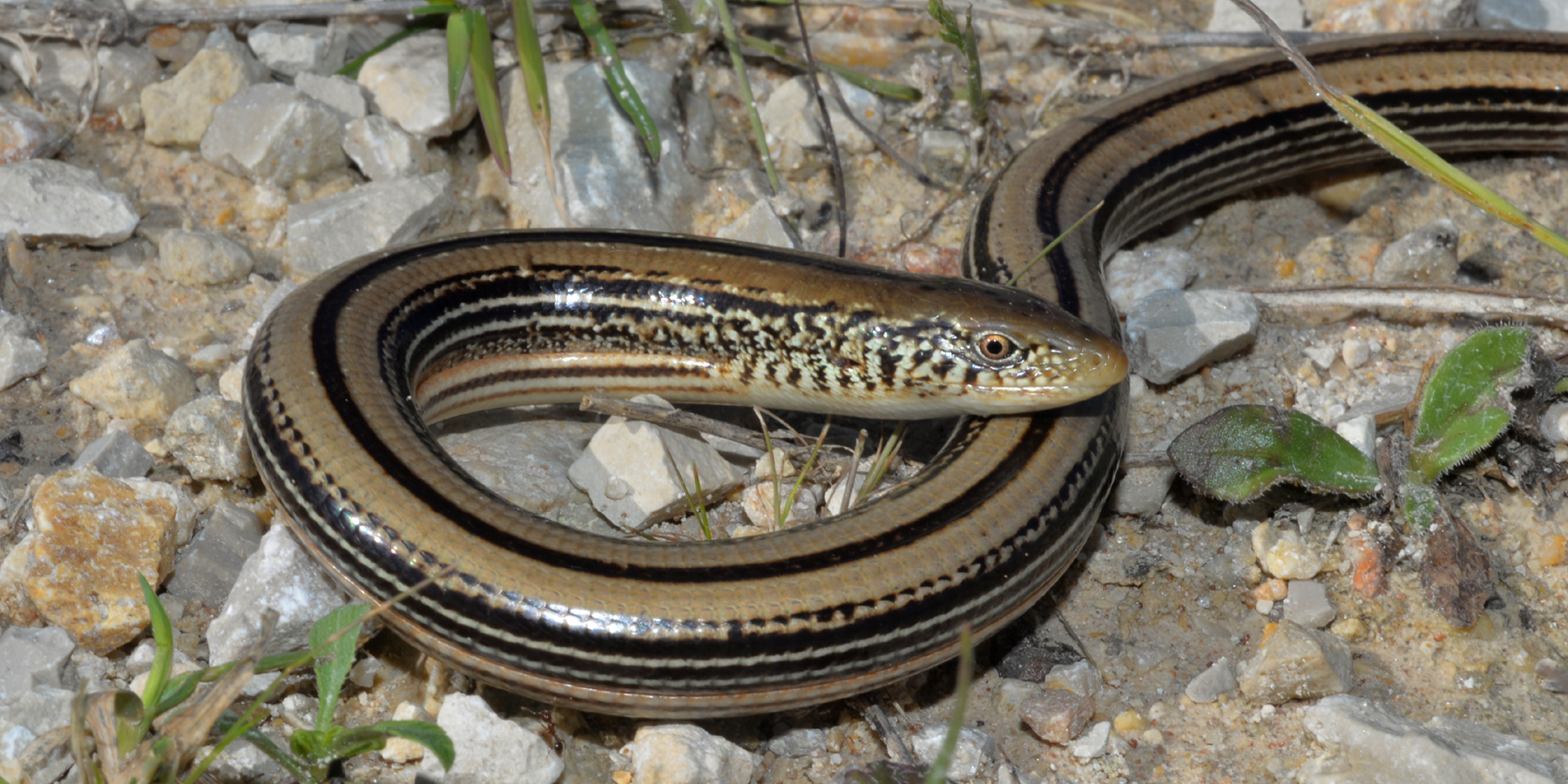
Western slender glass lizard (Ophisaurus attenuatus attenuatus), Colorado County, Texas (30 Mar 2018)

Slender glass lizards have yellow to brown bodies with six stripes and they have a middorsal stripe. White specks on the middle of the lizard's scales may sometimes form light stripes. O. attenuatus can attain a total length of 0.56 m (22 in) to 0.91 m (36 in). The species is closely related to collared lizards. Its tail comprises two-thirds of its body length. Its scales are supported by an osteoderm which makes the body hard and stiff. The species has a pointed snout and a non-distinct head. Males and females are of similar size. Its markings may fade as an individual ages.

Unlike snakes, they have eyelids and ears. Slender glass lizards have some difficulty moving across smooth surfaces because they do not have the large belly-plates and related muscles of snakes. The body of a snake is more flexible than that of this species and have different shaped scales.

== Behavior ==
Slender glass lizards are primarily diurnal and they can move fast. If captured, a specimen may thrash vigorously, causing part of the tail to fall off in one or more pieces. While a potential predator is distracted by the wiggling tail, the lizard quickly escapes. Observations have also reported the ability of western slender glass lizards to swim considerable distances when avoiding predation. They are known to sleep in burrows borrowed from other animals and they will use those burrows to hibernate. The species is active during the day when the weather is cool, but is only active during dawn and dusk when the temperature is hot. Similar to snakes, the species will hibernate in a hibernaculum. The species has also been known to make their own burrows in sandy soil. The lizard hibernates from October until April or May.

When a predator breaks off part of its tail, the tail never completely grows back which causes its tail to become shorter each time that it is attacked. They are known as slender glass lizards because their tail can be broken easily. The species can snap off their tail without it being touched and the partial tail that regenerates is tan, but it does not have the pattern of the original tail. The pieces of tail will continue to move once broken off. Two common beliefs are that the pieces of broken tail can grow into new lizards or rejoin into a new tail. In a 1989 study, 79% of the specimens in the population area had broken tails. It is hard to find a slender glass lizard that has its entire tail. They seldom bite when they are threatened. When they are approached, the lizard will sometimes stay still and try to blend in with the vegetation.

== Distribution ==
O. attenuatus is found in the midwestern and southeast United States, where it is endemic, in prairies, old fields, or open woodlands, often near water. They can also sometimes be found in longleaf pine forests and human-made debris.

== Diet and predators ==
Slender glass lizards eat a range of insects, such as grasshoppers, crickets and beetles, and will also consume spiders, small rodents, and snails. They have also been known to eat small lizards and small snakes. Unlike snakes, glass lizards do not have flexible jaws, and this limits the size of prey items they can consume. The size of their food can be no larger than the size of their head. They forage underground in burrows. A fold of their skin is able to expand their body when they are breathing, eating a large meal, or when they are carrying eggs.

Broad-winged hawks, red-tailed hawks, opossums, coyotes, bob cats, and raccoons are predators of the lizard. Snakes that feed on the lizard include the eastern racer (Coluber constrictor), ring-necked snake (Diadophis punctatus), prairie kingsnake (Lampropeltis calligaster), common kingsnake (Lampropeltis getula), and copperhead (Agkistrodon contortrix).

== Reproduction ==
Mating typically occurs biannually in May and they lay 5 to 15 oval eggs in late June or July. Eggs hatch 50–60 days after being laid and the mother then stays beside them throughout the incubation period. The eggs are laid under objects that can cover them including a log or a board. The eggs hatch after 53 days during August to October. Hatchlings are 10–13 cm (3.9–5.1 in) long and are difficult to find. Sexual maturity is attained at three or four years of age.

== Conservation status ==
Although not federally endangered in the United States, the Slender Glass Lizard is listed as vulnerable in Iowa and was listed as endangered in Wisconsin in 1979. In Iowa, it is illegal to capture them due to their vulnerability status. Primary threats include habitat loss and fragmentation stemming from human development. Insecticides also pose a threat to the lizard by eliminating their insect prey and potentially introducing toxins into their diet through the contaminated insects.

The Iowa Department of Natural Resources recommended steps to conserve the slender glass lizard which are to avoid burning grassland from April to October, to remove trees mechanically instead of using chemicals, and to limit insecticide use in areas where slender glass lizards are known to inhabit. The Wisconsin Department of Natural Resources recommends but does not require management and restoration of habitat for Slender Glass Lizards. Suggestions include managing roadside grassy buffers with the lizards in mind, as these buffers serve as important habitat. Management of invasive plant species encroaching on grasslands is also recommended.
