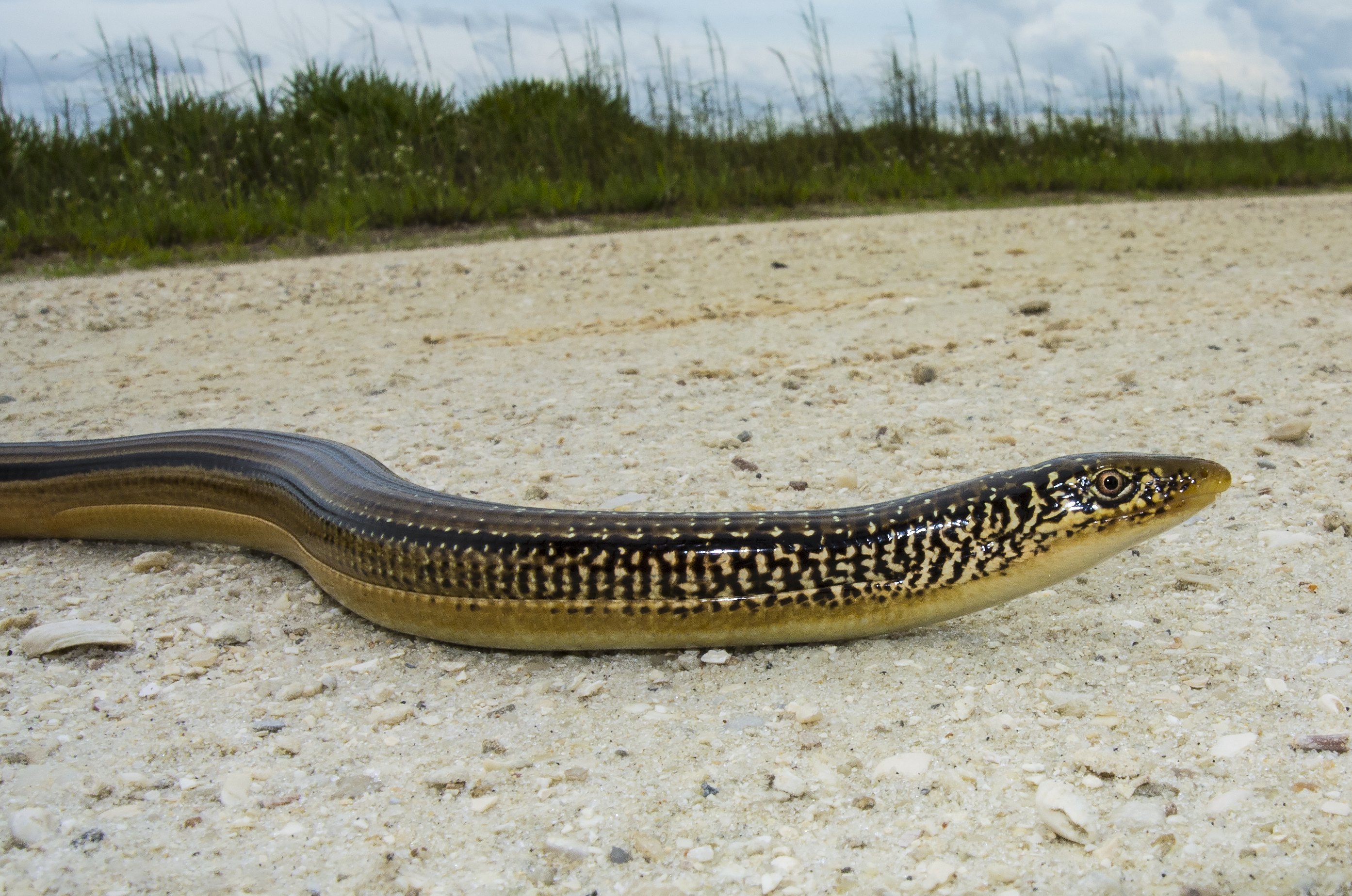

Conservation status
- Least Concern (IUCN 3.1)

Scientific classification
- Kingdom: Animalia
- Phylum: Chordata
- Order: Squamata
- Suborder: Anguimorpha
- Family: Anguidae
- Genus: Ophisaurus
- Species: O. compressus

Binomial name
- Ophisaurus compressus Cope, 1900
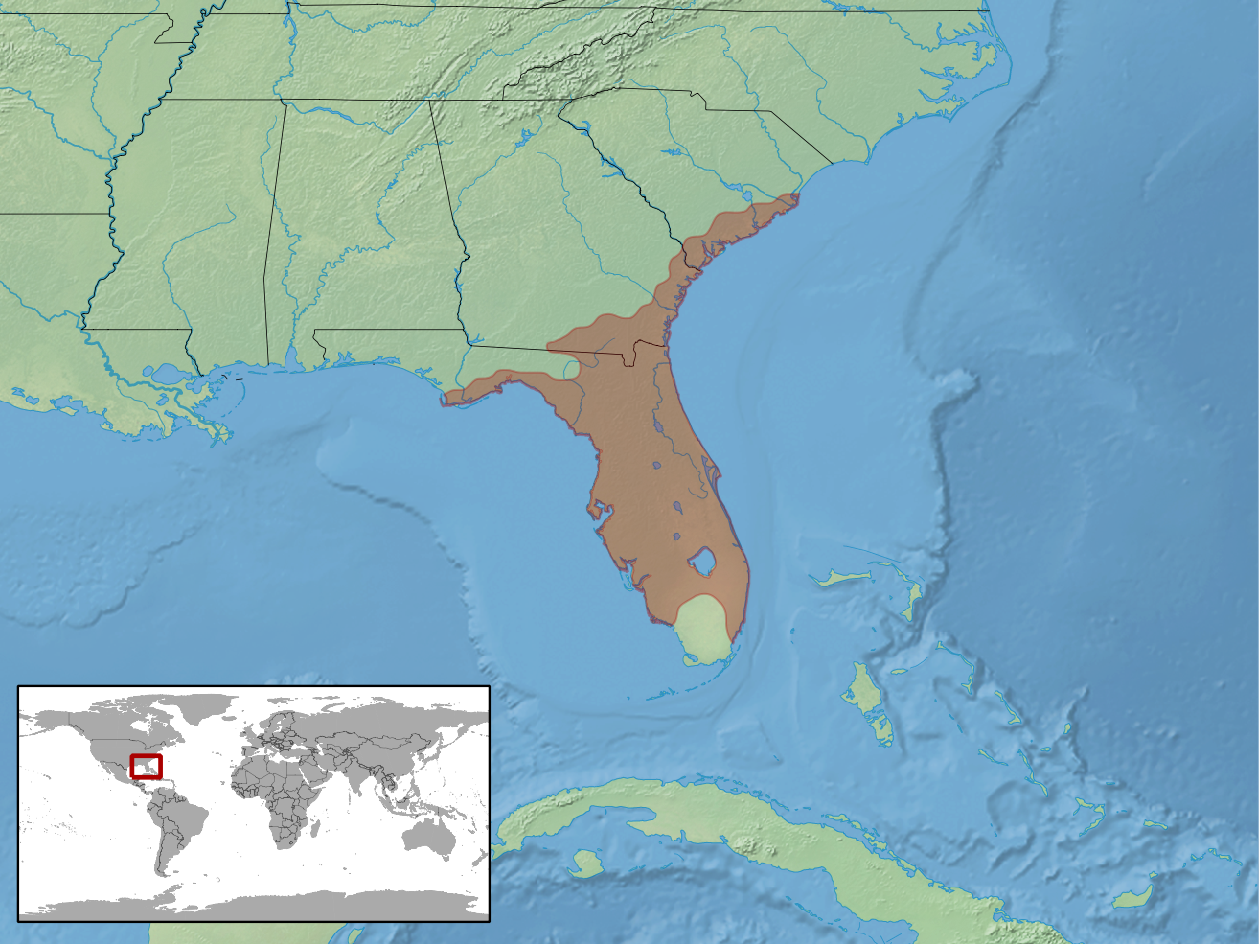

Synonyms
- Ophisaurus ventralis compressus Cope, 1900; Ophisaurus compressus — Conant & Collins, 1991

= Island glass lizard =

Species of reptile

The island glass lizard (Ophisaurus compressus) is a species of lizard in the family Anguidae. The species is endemic to the southeastern United States.

== Geographic range ==
O. compressus is found in Florida, southeastern Georgia, and southeastern South Carolina. Island glass lizards can be found in coastal sandy scrub areas, as well as adjacent pine flatwood habitats.

== Appearance and identification ==
O. compressus can reach adult lengths of 15–24 inches. They can be distinguished from other Ophisaurus by a single dark stripe along both sides of the body, just above the lateral groove, and a single dark middorsal stripe which may sometimes appear more broken than solid. They also have many light vertical bars along the side of the neck that are more prominent and numerous than those on the Eastern Glass Lizard (O. ventralis).

== Anatomy ==
O. compressus differs from other members of Ophisaurus in that they do not have fracture planes in the caudal vertebrae, which allow most Ophisaurus and many other lizards to easily shed their tails to evade predation.

== Reproduction ==
O. compressus is oviparous.
