= List of reptiles of Arkansas =

Fifteen species of reptiles are native within the U.S. state of Arkansas, in the south-central United States.

== Lizards ==
Twelve species of lizard are native to the state. The most common lizards are skinks, with six native Scincidae species.

The Western Slender Glass Lizard (Ophisaurus attenuatus attenuatus) is also native to the state.

== See also ==
- Lists of fauna of Arkansas
- Lists of reptiles of the United States
