= Ophisaurus ceroni =

Conservation status
- Endangered (IUCN 3.1)

Scientific classification
- Kingdom: Animalia
- Phylum: Chordata
- Class: Reptilia
- Order: Squamata
- Suborder: Anguimorpha
- Family: Anguidae
- Genus: Ophisaurus
- Species: O. ceroni

Binomial name
- Ophisaurus ceroni Holman, 1965

Species of lizard

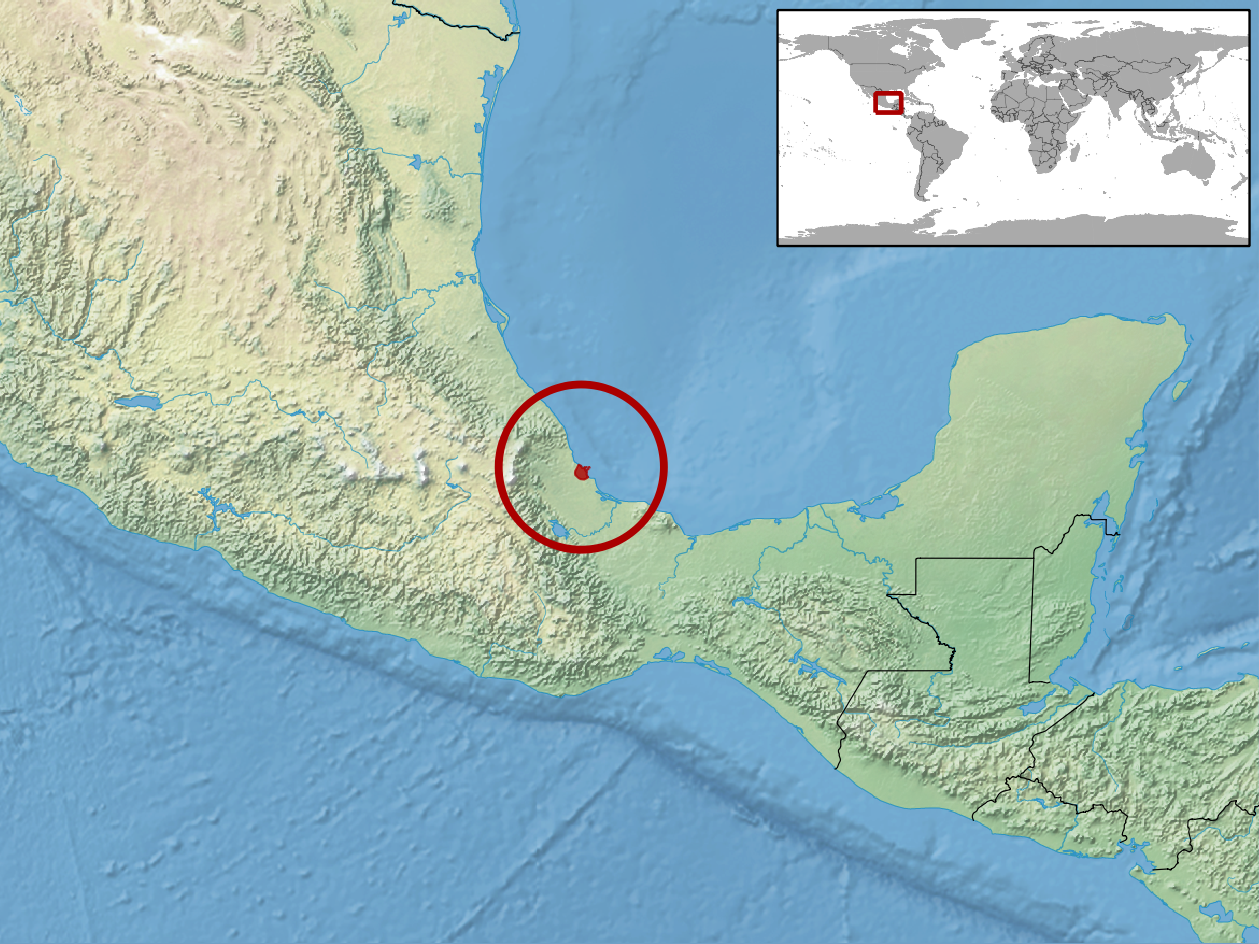
geographic distribution of Ophisaurus ceroni (Native: Mexico)

Ophisaurus ceroni, Ceron's glass lizard, is a species of lizard of the Anguidae family. It is found in Mexico.

This species is known only from a small area of coastal dunes in central Veracruz state, near the city of Veracruz.
