= Ophisaurus incomptus =

Conservation status
- Data Deficient (IUCN 3.1)

Scientific classification
- Kingdom: Animalia
- Phylum: Chordata
- Class: Reptilia
- Order: Squamata
- Suborder: Anguimorpha
- Family: Anguidae
- Genus: Ophisaurus
- Species: O. incomptus

Binomial name
- Ophisaurus incomptus McConkey, 1955

Species of lizard

Ophisaurus incomptus, the plainneck glass lizard, is a species of lizard of the Anguidae family. It is found in Mexico.

This species is known only from the Veracruz moist forests of southeastern San Luis Potosí state. It is known from fewer than five locations, over a total range area of less than 5,000 km^{2}. The species is poorly known and may occur more widely.
