= Ludovic's glass lizard =

Conservation status
- Least Concern (IUCN 3.1)

Scientific classification
- Kingdom: Animalia
- Phylum: Chordata
- Class: Reptilia
- Order: Squamata
- Suborder: Anguimorpha
- Family: Anguidae
- Genus: Dopasia
- Species: D. ludovici

Binomial name
- Dopasia ludovici (Mocquard, 1905)

Synonyms
- Ophisaurus ludovici Mocquard, 1905

Species of lizard

Dopasia ludovici, also known commonly as Ludovic's glass lizard, is a species of lizard in the subfamily Anguinae of the family Anguidae. The species is native to Southeast Asia.

== Etymology ==
The specific name, ludovici (meaning "of Louis" in Latin), is in honor of French zoologist Léon Louis Vaillant.

== Geographic range ==
Dopasia ludovici is found in northern Vietnam, and it has been reported to also occur in Sichuan, China.

== Description ==
Dopasia ludovici has no legs. Its dorsal scales are strongly keeled. It may attain a snout-to-vent length (SVL) of 19.5 cm (7.7 in).

== Habitat ==
The preferred natural habitat of Dopasia ludovici is forest, at altitudes of 1,000–1,500 m (3,300–4,900 ft).

== Behavior ==
Dopasia ludovici is terrestrial and fossorial.
