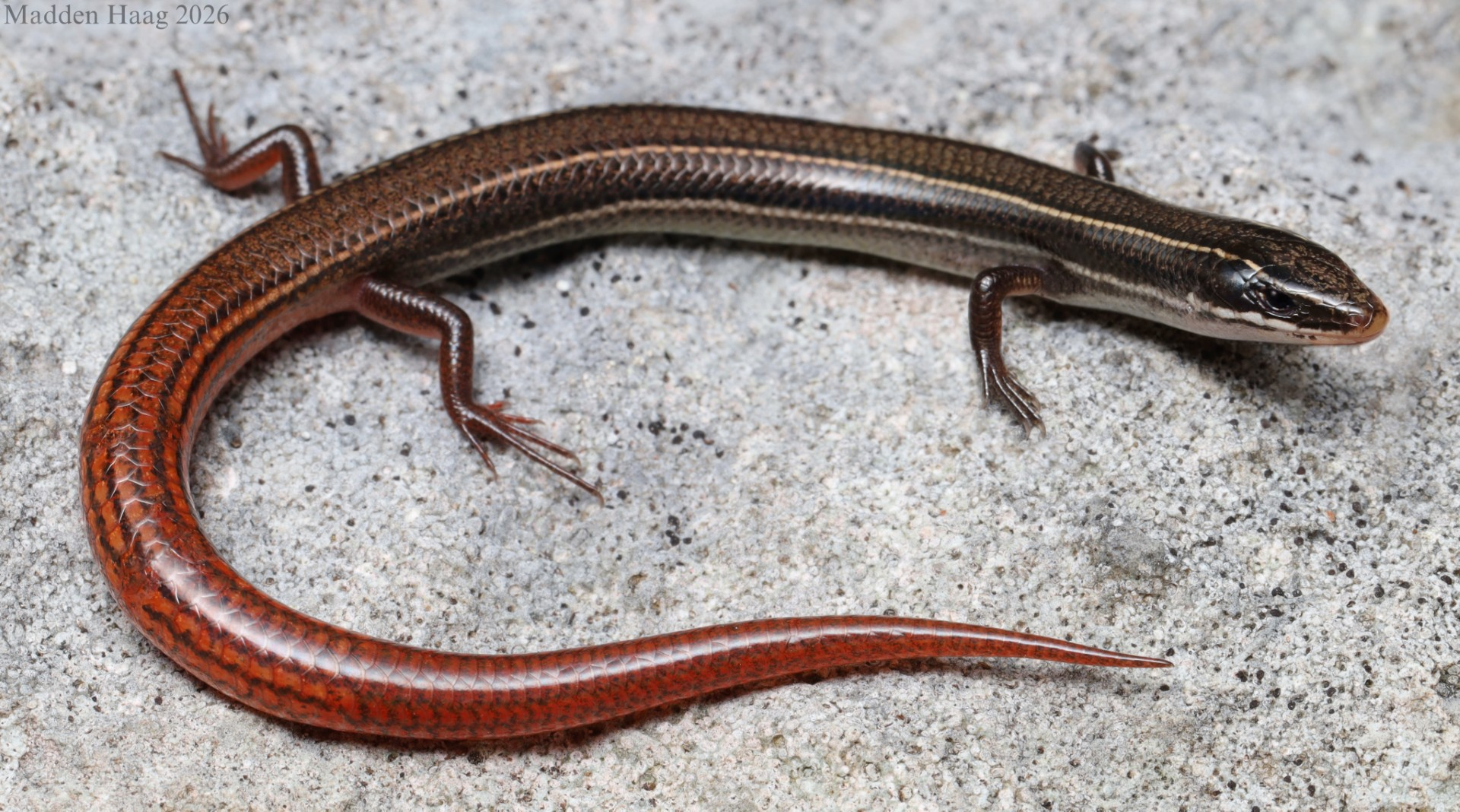
- Florida Keys Mole Skink (P. e. egregius)
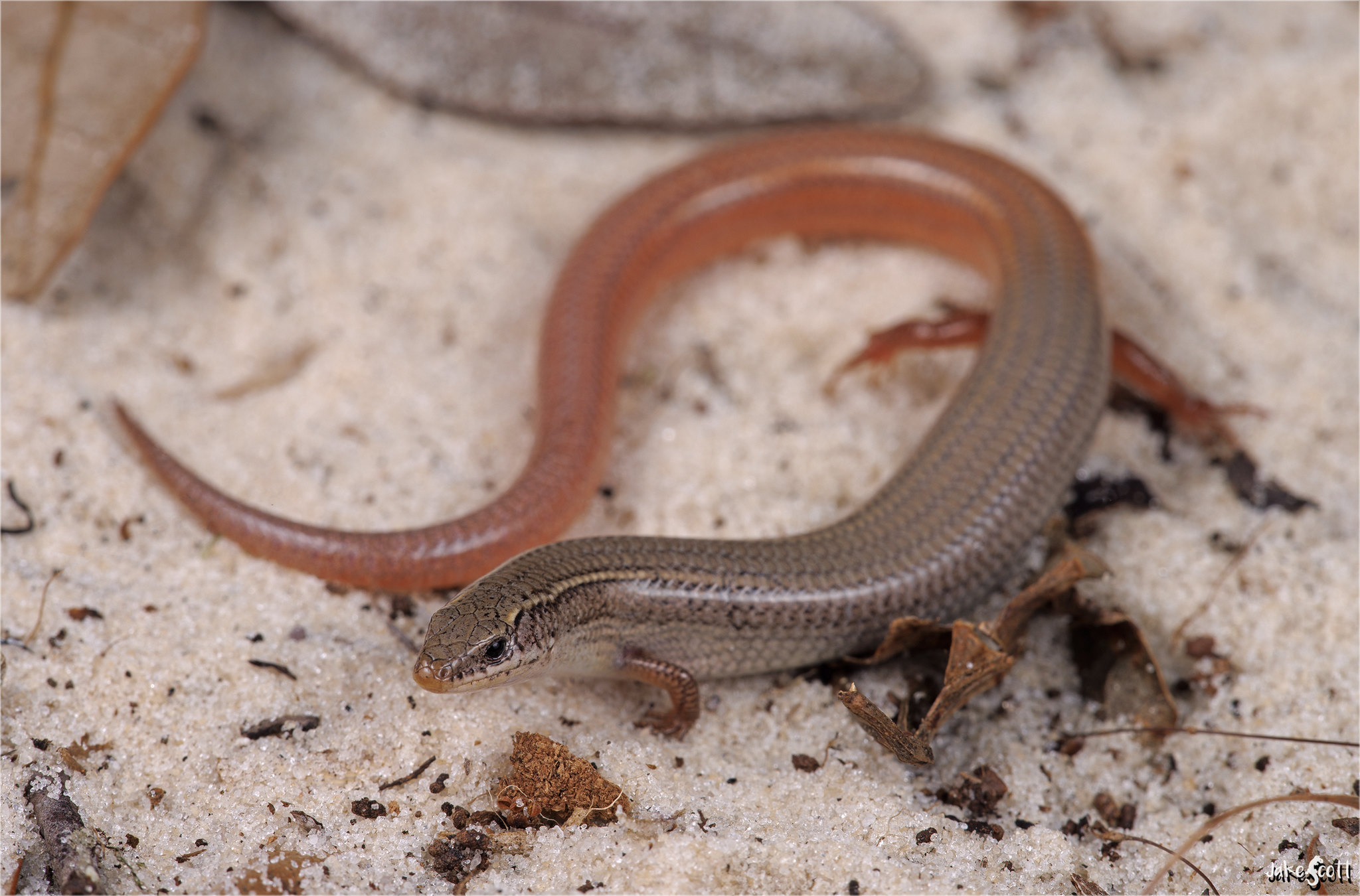
- Cedar Keys Mole Skink (P. e. insularis)

Conservation status
- Least Concern (IUCN 3.1)

- Secure (NatureServe)

Scientific classification
- Kingdom: Animalia
- Phylum: Chordata
- Class: Reptilia
- Order: Squamata
- Family: Scincidae
- Genus: Plestiodon
- Species: P. egregius

Binomial name
- Plestiodon egregius Baird, 1859
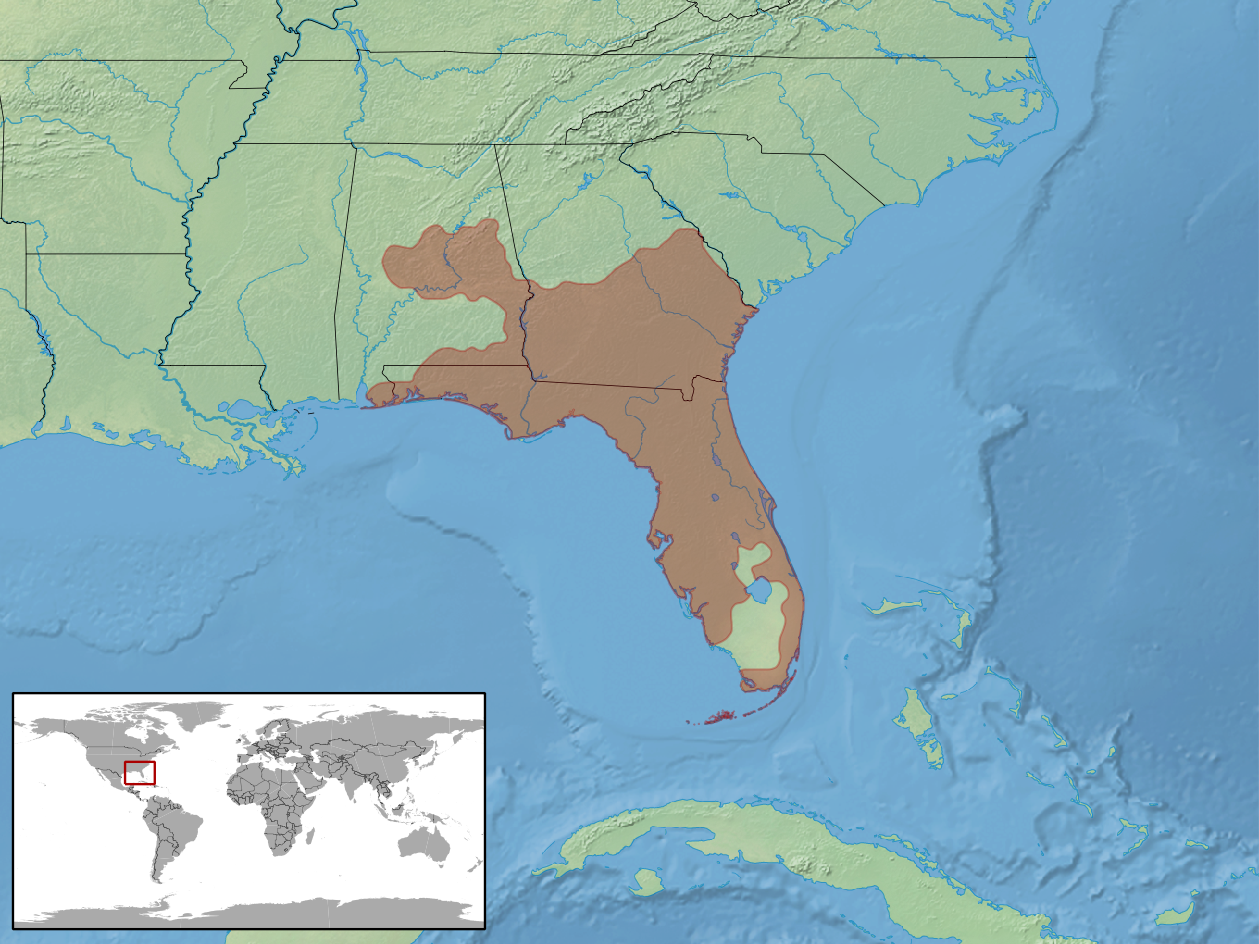

Synonyms
- Plestiodon egregius Baird, 1859; Eumeces egregius — Taylor, 1936; Plestiodon egregius —Schmitz et al., 2004

= Plestiodon egregius =

Mole skink subspecies

Species of reptile

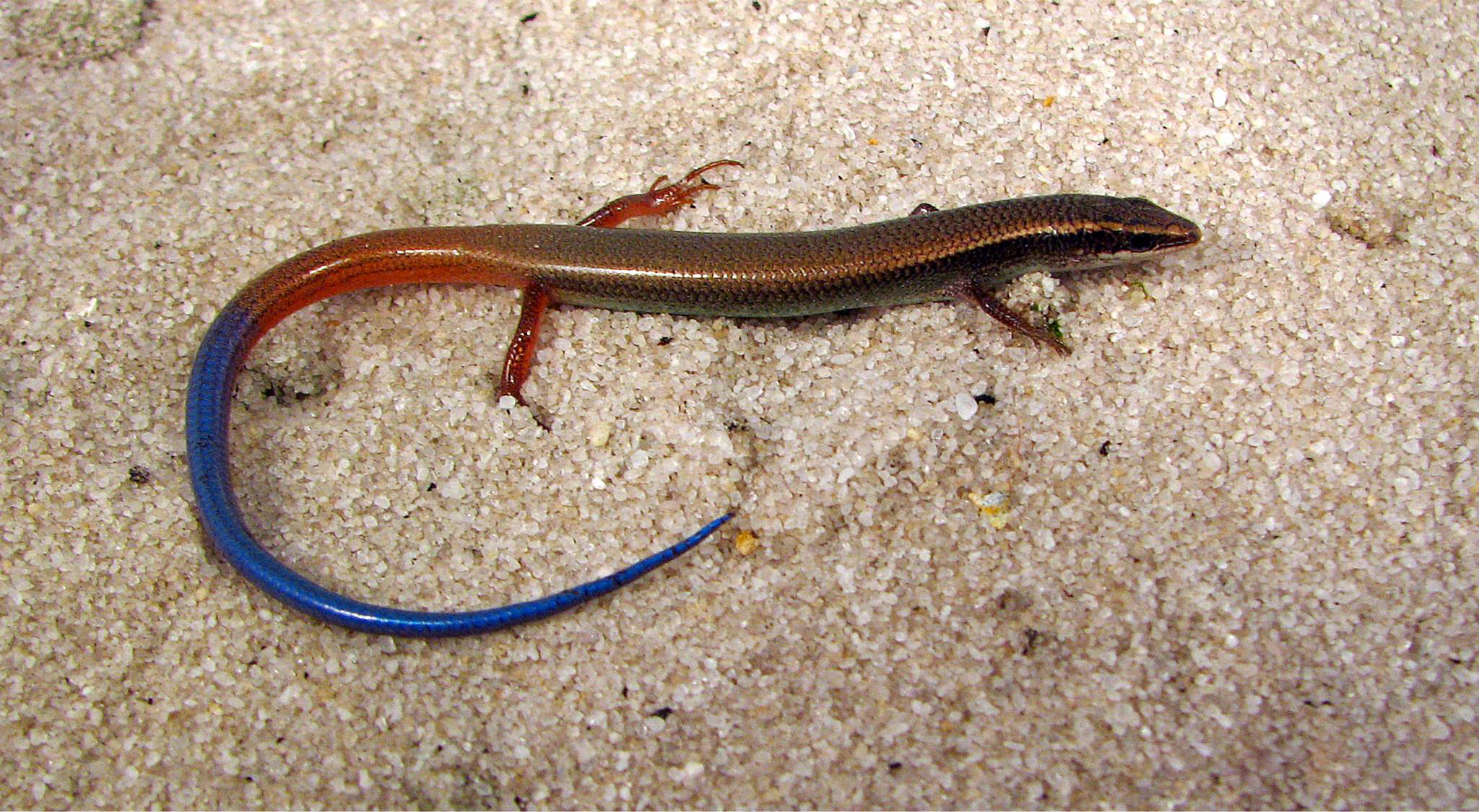
Bluetail Mole Skink (Eumeces egregius lividus) Highlands County, Florida

Plestiodon egregius, the mole skink, is a species of small lizard endemic to the Southeastern United States.

== Taxonomy ==
The species is subdivided into five subspecies, including the nominotypical subspecies:

- Florida Keys mole skink, P. e. egregius Baird, 1859: occurs only on some of the Florida Keys.
- Cedar Key mole skink, P. e. insularis (Mount, 1965): occurs only on three islands at Cedar Key.
- Bluetail mole skink, P. e. lividus (Mount, 1965): occurs only in Central Florida; shares its Florida Scrub habitat with the Sand Skink.
- Peninsula mole skink, P. e. onocrepis Cope, 1871.
- Northern mole skink, P. e. similis (McConkey, 1957).

The species was first described by Baird in 1859 as Plestiodon egregius. In 1871, P. onocrepis was described by Cope. In 1875, the two species were reassigned to the genus Eumeces. In 1935, two subspecies were defined, E. e. egregius and E. e. onocrepis, and in 1957, E. e. similis was separated from E. e. egregius. In 2005 North American members of genus Eumeces were reassigned to Plestiodon.

== Status ==
The first three subspecies listed above are protected, and the bluetail mole skink is classified as a federally-threatened species since 1987. The major threats to all three subspecies are habitat destruction due to residential, commercial, and agricultural development and over-collection by herpetological enthusiasts. The remaining two subspecies are rather common, though elusive. The northern mole skink also occurs in southern Alabama and Georgia.

== Habitat ==
Mole skinks are found in sandhills and scrub. They often like to be buried underground and especially like to bask in the upper layers of Southeastern pocket gopher mounds.

== Reproduction ==
Mole skinks reach sexual maturity after one year. They mate in winter; the female lays three to seven eggs in spring in a shallow nest cavity less than 30 cm (12 in) below the surface. The eggs incubate for 31 to 51 days, during which time the female tends the nest.

== Bluetail mole skink ==
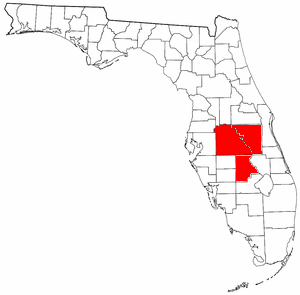
Bluetail mole skink distribution

=== Description ===
The bluetail mole skink is a small, shiny, cylindrical lizard of a brownish color. Juveniles usually have a blue tail which makes up slightly more than half of the animal's total length. Regenerated tails and the tails of older individuals are typically pinkish. The legs are somewhat reduced in size and are used only during surface locomotion, not when the animal "swims" through the sand (Christman 1992). During the breeding season, males develop a colorful orange pattern on their sides.

The bluetail mole skink grows to 9 to 15 cm (3.5 to 6 in).

=== Habitat and behavior ===
It shares habitat with the sand skink, which is also endangered, but does not compete with it: whereas the sand skink feeds underground, the bluetail mole skink hunts on the surface. When threatened, it plays presents its tail and if refused, plays dead.

=== Diet ===
Like other mole skinks, it feeds primarily on cockroaches, spiders, and crickets. It is currently unknown of its diet includes any of the poorly studied regional endemic Florida scrub arthropods such as the Lake Placid funnel wolf spider (Sosippus placidus Brady, 1972), which itself is a species of conservation concern.

=== Geographic range ===
It is found in central Florida. Map should also reflect Seminole and Orange counties. Also sighted in Volusia, Brevard, Marion, Sumter, Pasco, and Charlotte Counties.

=== Conservation status ===
The bluetail mole skink is a federally-threatened species.

== Selected literature ==
- Baird, S.F. 1859. Descriptions of New Genera and Species of North American Lizards in the Museum of the Smithsonian Institution. Proc. Acad. Nat. Sci. Philadelphia "1858" [10]: 253–256. ("Plestiodon egregius, Baird", p. 256.)
- Christman, S.P. (1992): Endangered: blue-tailed mole skink, Eumeces egregius lividus (Mount). Pages 117-122 in P.E. Moler, ed. Rare and endangered biota of Florida. University Press of Florida, Gainesville, Florida.
- McConkey, E.H. 1957. The Subspecies of Eumeces egregius, a Lizard of the Southeastern United States. Bull. Florida State Mus. 2 (2): 13–23. ("Eumeces egregius similis, subsp. nov.", pp. 17–18.)
- Mount, R.H. (1965): Variation and systematics of the scincoid lizard Eumeces egregius (Baird). Bulletin of the Florida State Museum 9:183–213.
- Smith, Hobart M. 2005. Plestiodon: a Replacement Name for Most Members of the Genus Eumeces in North America. Journal of Kansas Herpetology. Number 14. pp. 15–16.
- Taylor, E.H. 1936. A Taxonomic Study of the Cosmopolitan Scincoid Lizards of the Genus Eumeces with an Account of the Distribution and Relationships of its Species. Univ. Kansas Sci. Bull. "1935" 23 (14): 1–643. (Eumeces egregius, p. 490.)
