= Hainan glass lizard =

Conservation status
- Least Concern (IUCN 3.1)

Scientific classification
- Kingdom: Animalia
- Phylum: Chordata
- Class: Reptilia
- Order: Squamata
- Suborder: Anguimorpha
- Family: Anguidae
- Genus: Dopasia
- Species: D. hainanensis

Binomial name
- Dopasia hainanensis (Yang, 1983)
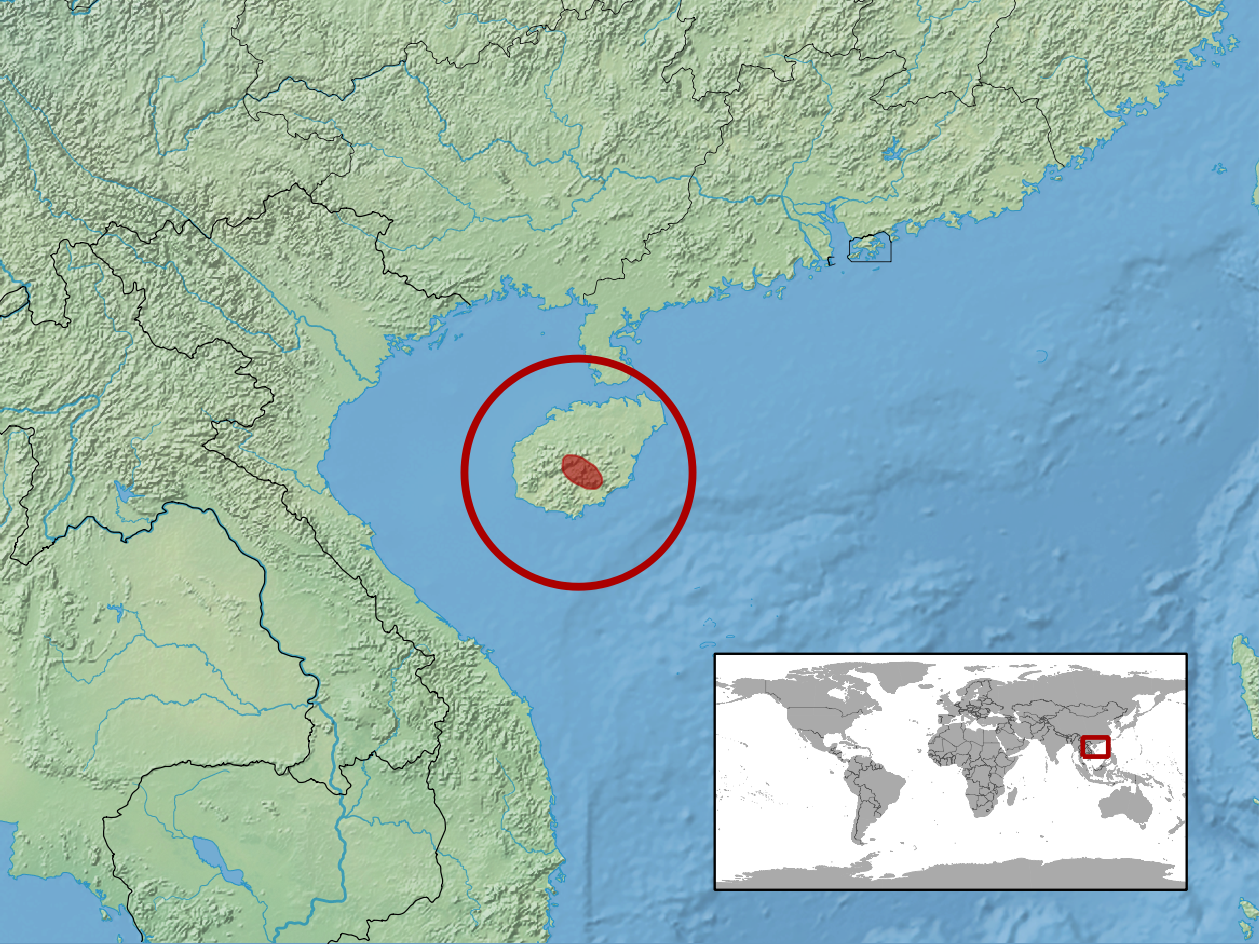

Species of lizard

The Hainan glass lizard (Dopasia hainanensis) is a species of lizard of the Anguidae family. It is endemic to Hainan Island in China.
