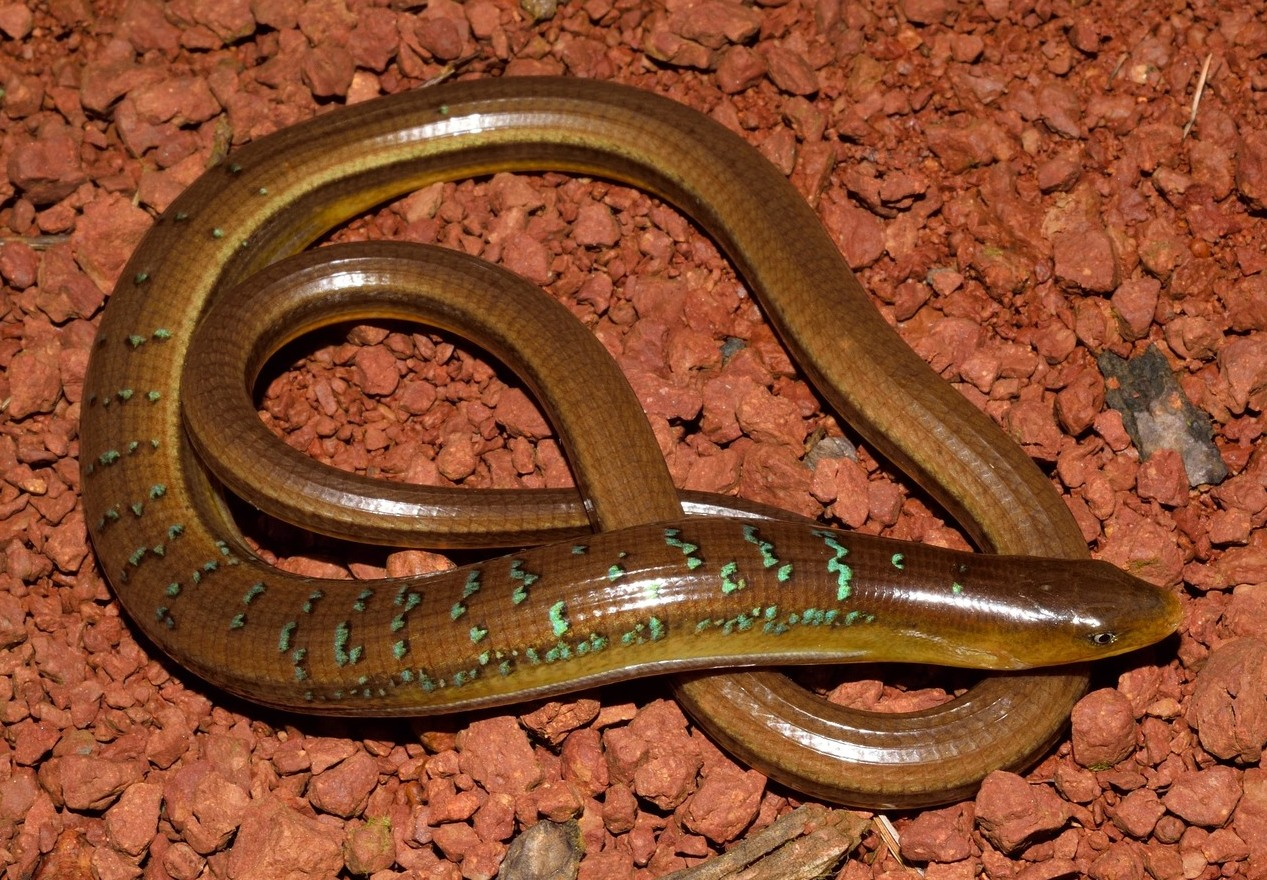

Conservation status
- Least Concern (IUCN 3.1)

Scientific classification
- Kingdom: Animalia
- Phylum: Chordata
- Class: Reptilia
- Order: Squamata
- Suborder: Anguimorpha
- Family: Anguidae
- Genus: Dopasia
- Species: D. gracilis

Binomial name
- Dopasia gracilis (Gray, 1845)

Synonyms
- Pseudopus gracilis Gray, 1845; Ophiseps tessellatus Blyth, 1853; Ophisaurus gracilis — Boulenger, 1885; Dopasia gracilis — Camp, 1923

= Dopasia gracilis =

Species of lizard

Dopasia gracilis, known commonly as the Asian glass lizard, the Burmese glass lizard, or the Indian glass snake, is a species of legless lizard in the family Anguidae. The species is endemic to Asia.

== Geographic range ==
Dopasia gracilis is found in southern China, northern India, northern Myanmar, Nepal, Thailand, and Vietnam. It may also be found in northern Bangladesh and Laos.

== Description ==
From A. C. L. G. Günther (1864) The Reptiles of British India:

This species is very closely allied to its European congener, differing, however, from it by the total absence of the rudimentary, scale-like hind limbs of that species. From the North American Glass Snake it differs in having the palatine teeth small, and arranged in a very narrow band. The upper surface of its head is covered with a large vertical plate and three smaller occipitals behind, the space between the vertical and the rostral being filled up by about five pairs of rather irregular frontals of unequal size; the superciliaries are arranged in two series. The dorsal scales form fourteen longitudinal series, each series with a slight continuous keel; the ventral scales are smooth, in ten series. The upper parts are brown, with some irregular black spots across the back.

The typical specimen is from the Khasya Hills, 15 inches long [including tail], the tail measuring 10. We may infer, from its close resemblance to Pseudopus pallasii, that its habits are similar. It probably lives in dry places, under stones, feeding on small lizards, mice, &c. The scaly covering of the upper and lower parts is so tight, that it does not admit of the same extension as in snakes or other lizards, and the Pseudopus, therefore, could not receive the same quantity of food in its stomach as those animals were it not for the expansible fold of the skin running along each side of its trunk. Whilst in other Saurians the whole skin of the belly and of the sides is extensible, the extensibility here is limited to a separate part of the skin.

== Reproduction ==
Dopasia gracilis is oviparous.
