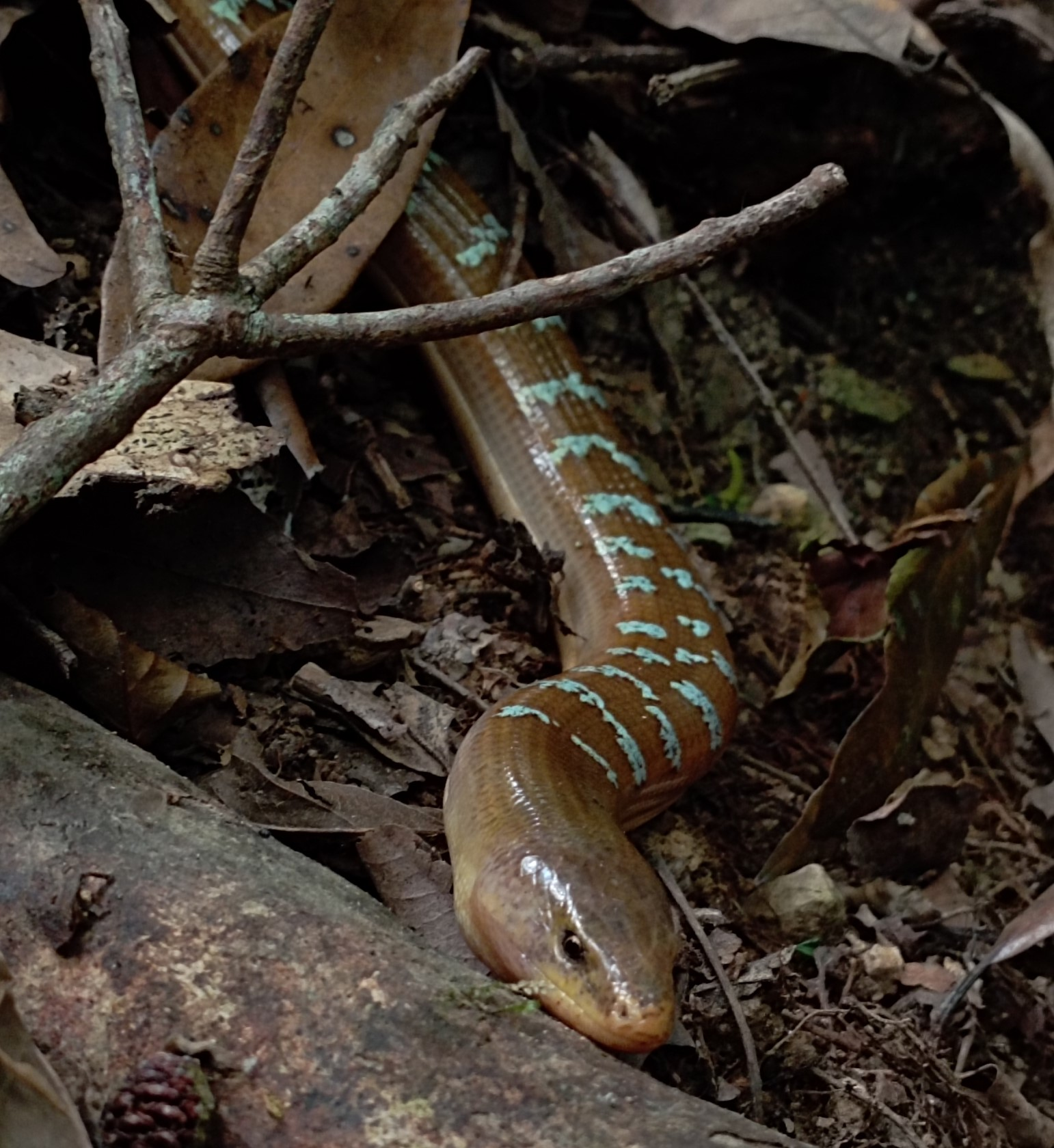

Conservation status
- Least Concern (IUCN 3.1)

Scientific classification
- Kingdom: Animalia
- Phylum: Chordata
- Class: Reptilia
- Order: Squamata
- Suborder: Anguimorpha
- Family: Anguidae
- Genus: Dopasia
- Species: D. harti

Binomial name
- Dopasia harti (Boulenger, 1899)
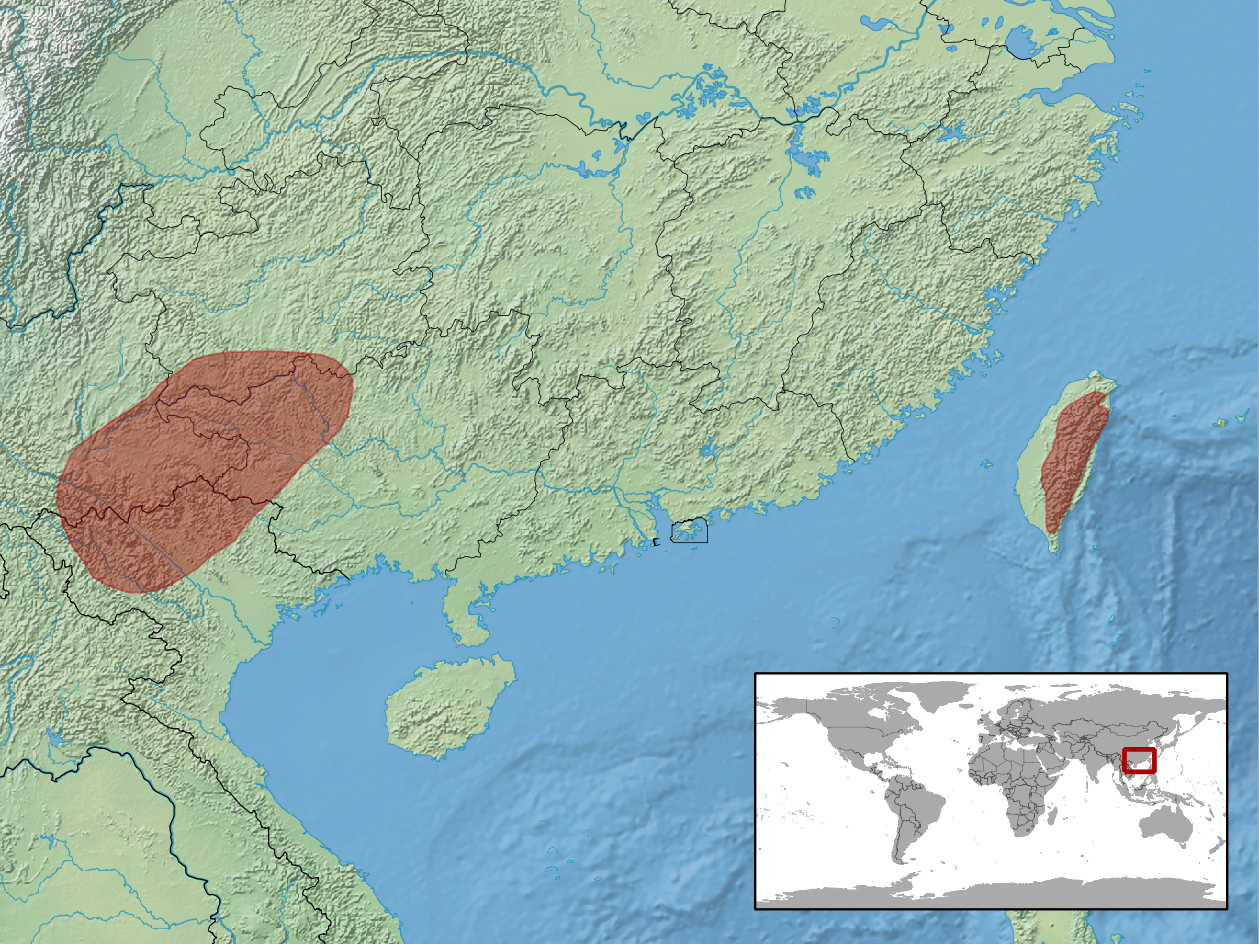

Synonyms
- Ophisaurus harti Boulenger, 1899; Ophisaurus formosensis Kishida, 1930

= Hart's glass lizard =

Species of lizard

Dopasia harti, also known commonly as the Chinese glass lizard and Hart's glass lizard, is a species of lizard in the family Anguidae. The species is native to south-eastern Asia.

== Etymology ==
The specific name, harti, is in honor of Robert Hart, who was a British customs official in China.

== Distribution ==
D. harti is found in southern China, Taiwan, and northern Vietnam.

== Habitat ==
The preferred natural habitat of D. harti is forest, at altitudes of 400–2,600 m (1,300–8,500 ft), but it has also been found in farmland.

== Description ==
D. harti is limbless.

== Behavior ==
D. harti is terrestrial and fossorial.

== Reproduction ==
D. harti is oviparous. From June to September, the female of the species may lay a clutch of 4–13 eggs under leaf litter or rocks, and then stay with the eggs to guard them.
