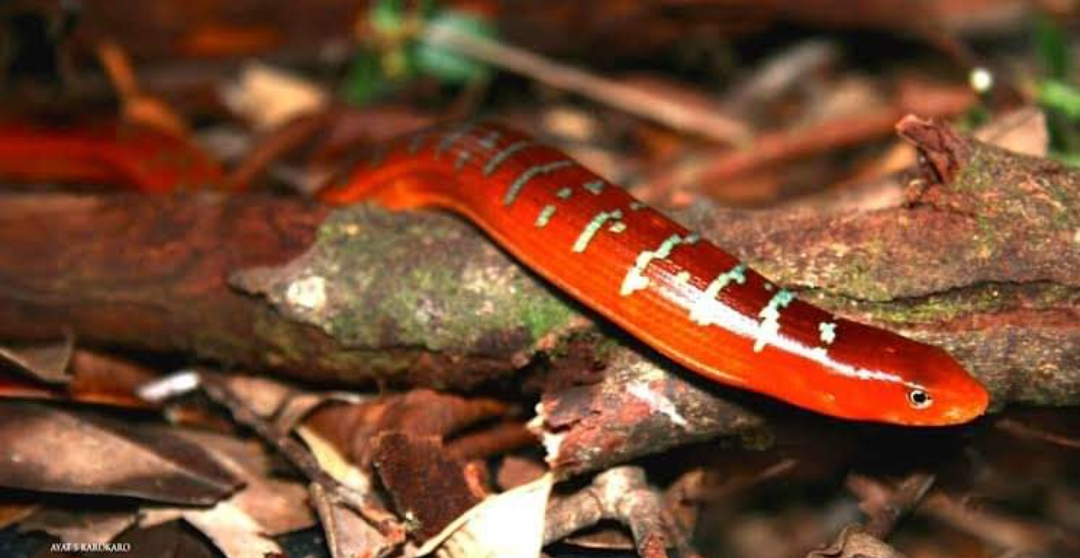

Conservation status
- Least Concern (IUCN 3.1)

Scientific classification
- Kingdom: Animalia
- Phylum: Chordata
- Class: Reptilia
- Order: Squamata
- Suborder: Anguimorpha
- Family: Anguidae
- Genus: Dopasia
- Species: D. wegneri

Binomial name
- Dopasia wegneri (Mertens, 1959)
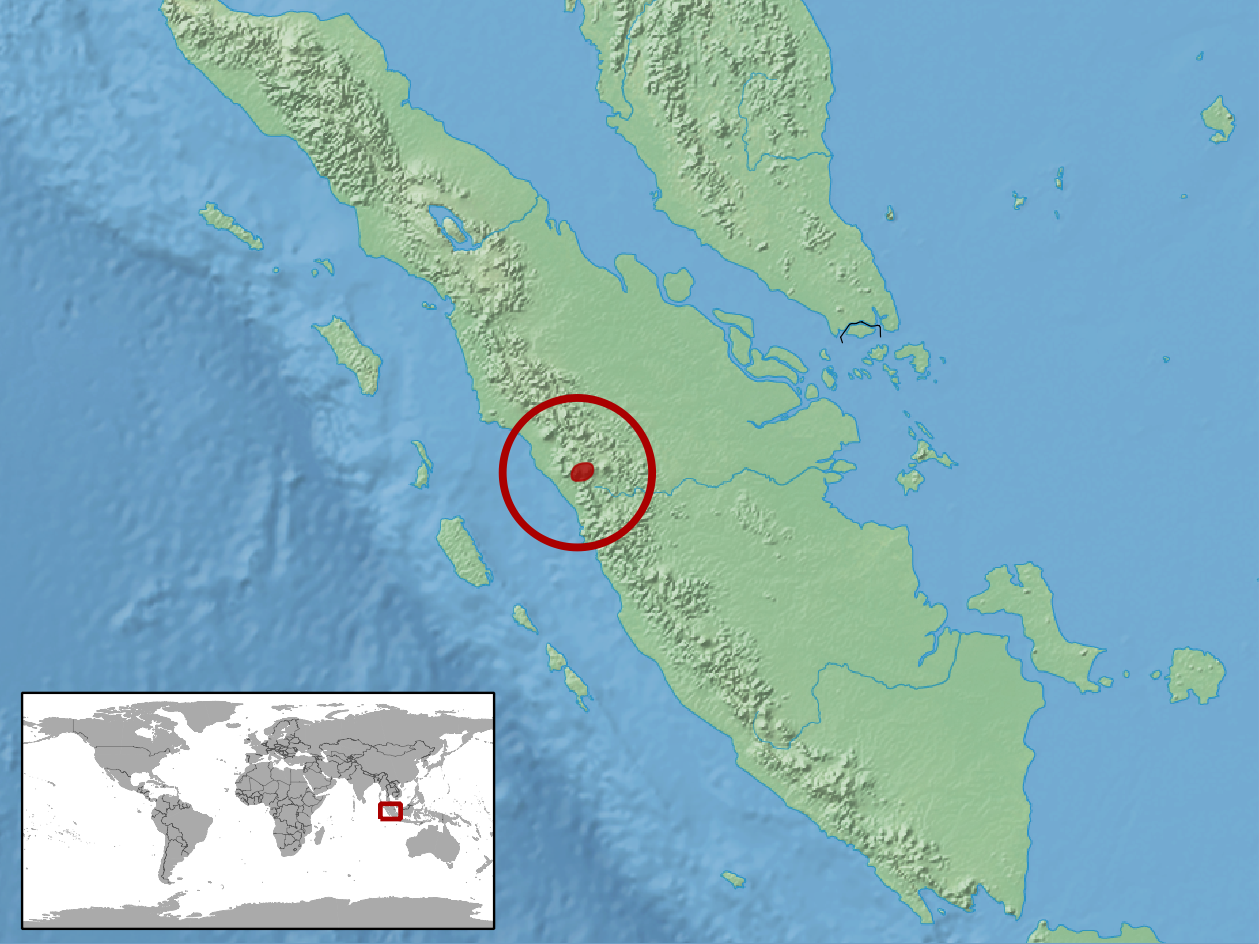

= Wegner's glass lizard =

Species of lizard

Dopasia wegneri, Wegner's glass lizard, is a species of lizard of the Anguidae family. It is found in Sumatra in Indonesia.
