= Buettikofer's glass lizard =

Conservation status
- Least Concern (IUCN 3.1)

Scientific classification
- Kingdom: Animalia
- Phylum: Chordata
- Class: Reptilia
- Order: Squamata
- Suborder: Anguimorpha
- Family: Anguidae
- Genus: Dopasia
- Species: D. buettikoferi

Binomial name
- Dopasia buettikoferi (Lidth de Jeude, 1905)

Synonyms
- Ophisaurus büttikoferi Lidth de Jeude, 1905; Ophisaurus buettikoferi (Lidth de Jeude, 1905)

Species of lizard

Dopasia buettikoferi, also known commonly as the Bornean glass snake and Buettikofer's glass lizard, is a species of lizard in the family Anguidae. The species is native to Indonesia and Malaysia on the island of Borneo.

== Etymology ==
The specific name, buettikoferi, is in honor of Swiss zoologist Johann Büttikofer.

== Habitat ==
The preferred natural habitat of D. buettikoferi is forest, at altitudes of 300–1,600 m (980–5,250 ft).

== Description ==
D. buettikoferi has no external limbs, and its tail is three times as long as its head and body. The holotype has a snout-to-vent length (SVL) of 12.5 cm (4.9 in) and a tail length of 37.5 cm (14.8 in). It is brown dorsally and yellowish ventally. There is a dark brown line on each side of the body and tail.

== Behavior ==
D. buettikoferi is diurnal, terrestrial, and semi-fossorial.

== Diet ==
D. buettikoferi preys predominately upon insects.

== Reproduction ==
D. buettikoferi is oviparous.
