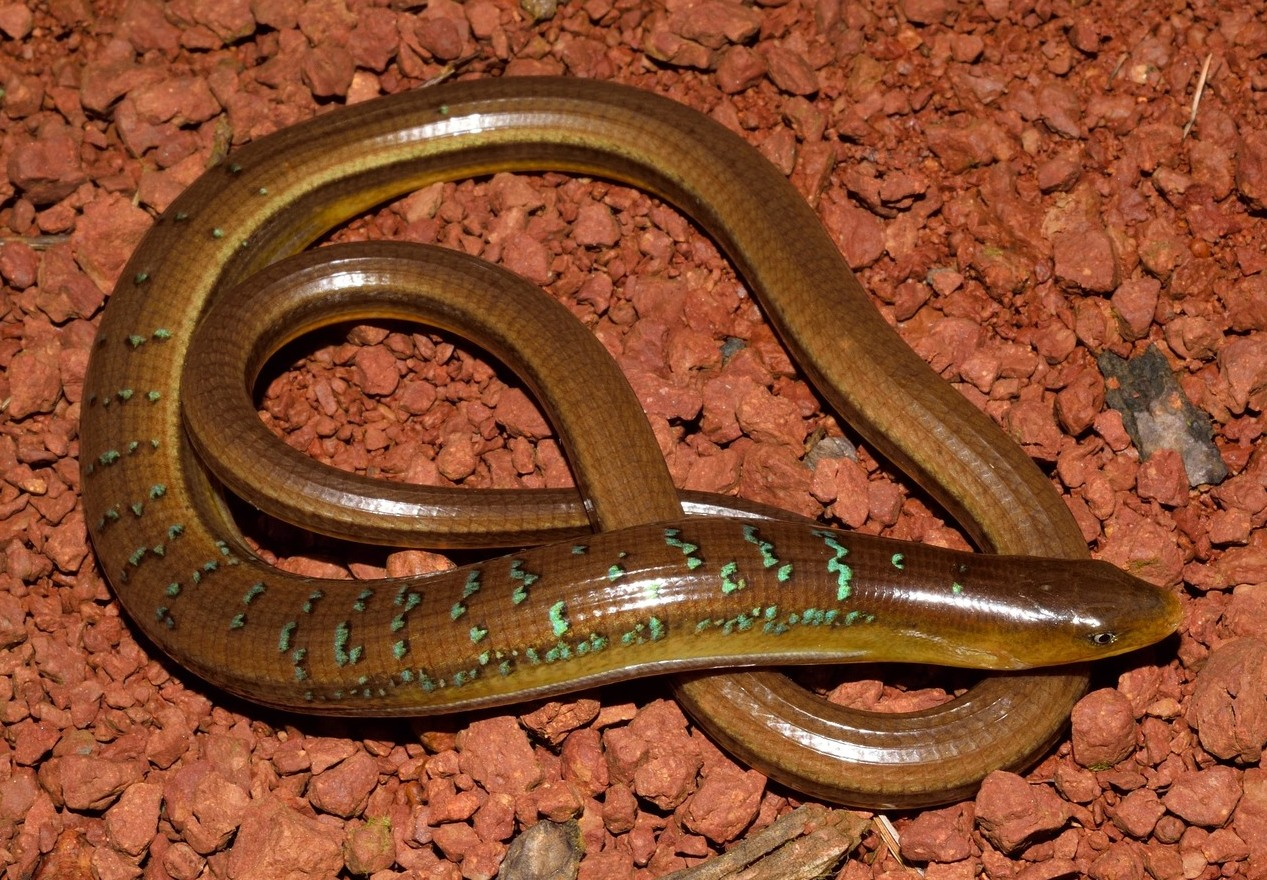
- Dopasia gracilis

Scientific classification
- Kingdom: Animalia
- Phylum: Chordata
- Class: Reptilia
- Order: Squamata
- Suborder: Anguimorpha
- Family: Anguidae
- Subfamily: Anguinae
- Genus: Dopasia; Gray, 1853

Species
- Seven, see text

= Dopasia =

Dopasia Temporal range: Early Oligocene–Recent

Genus of lizards

Dopasia is a genus of lizards in the family Anguidae. The genus contains seven species, which are native to Asia. They are most closely related to the North American Ophisaurus, and are sometimes considered part of that genus.

== Species ==
The following species are recognized as being valid.

- Dopasia buettikoferi (Lidth De Jeude, 1905) – Buettikofer's glass lizard
- Dopasia gracilis (Gray, 1845) – Burmese glass lizard, Asian glass lizard, Indian glass snake
- Dopasia hainanensis (Yang, 1984) – Hainan glass lizard
- Dopasia harti (Boulenger, 1899) – Hart's glass lizard
- Dopasia ludovici (Mocquard, 1905) – Ludovic's glass lizard
- Dopasia sokolovi (Darevsky & Nguyen, 1983) – Sokolov's glass lizard
- Dopasia wegneri (Mertens, 1959) – Wegner's glass lizard

The Taiwanese Dopasia formosensis was synonymised with D. harti in 2003, but may represent a valid species in its own right.

Nota bene: A binomial authority in parentheses indicates that the species was originally described in a genus other than Dopasia.

== Fossil record ==
Fossils of the genus Dopasia are known from the Oligocene of Belgium and France, the Miocene of Morocco, and the Pliocene of the Balearic Islands.
