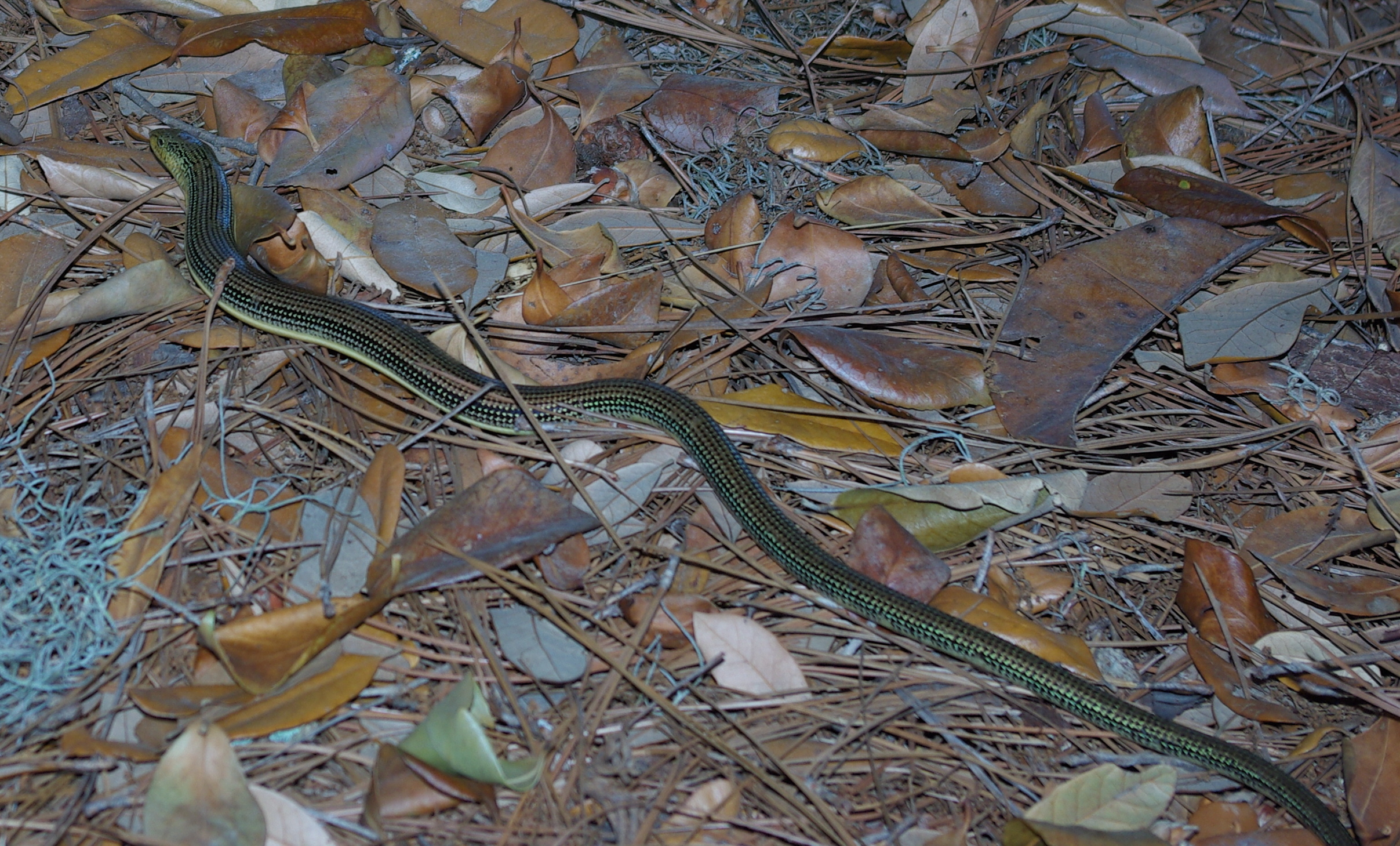
- An eastern glass lizard (Ophisaurus ventralis)

Scientific classification
- Kingdom: Animalia
- Phylum: Chordata
- Class: Reptilia
- Order: Squamata
- Suborder: Anguimorpha
- Family: Anguidae
- Subfamily: Anguinae

Genera
- Anguis; Dopasia; Hyalosaurus; †Ophisauromimus; Ophisaurus; Pseudopus

= Anguinae =

Anguinae Temporal range: Eocene–Recent

Subfamily of reptiles

Anguinae is a subfamily of legless lizards in the family Anguidae, commonly called glass lizards, glass snakes or slow worms. The first two names come from the fact their tails easily break or snap off. Members of Anguinae are native to North America, Europe, Asia, and North Africa.

== Evolution ==
They first appeared in Europe during the early Eocene, approximately 48.6 million years ago, originating from North American ancestors that crossed over from Greenland via the Thule Land Bridge and spread toward Asia sometime after the drying of the Turgai Strait at the beginning of the Oligocene, and then across the Bering Land Bridge to North America during the Miocene.

== Description ==
Very vestigial hindlegs are present in Hyalosaurus and Pseudopus, but are entirely absent in the other genera. Members of the group largely feed on insects and other invertebrates. The largest living species, the Sheltopusik (Pseudopus apodus), can reach lengths of 120 centimetres (47 in).

== Taxonomy ==
The subfamily contains the following genera:

- Dopasia (7 species), native to eastern Asia
- Hyalosaurus (1 species), native to North Africa
- †Ophisauromimus (2 species) native to Europe
- Ophisaurus (6 species), native to eastern North America
- Pseudopus (1 extant species, the Sheltopusik), native to Europe and Asia
- Anguis – slowworms (5 species), native to Europe and Western Asia

Relationships after Lavin & Girman, 2019:

- Anguinae
  - - Hyalosaurus
    - - Anguis
      - Pseudopus
  - - Ophisaurus
    - Dopasia
