= Edwin H. McConkey =

American biologist

- Education: University of Florida
- Known for: northern mole skink
- Scientific career
- Fields: Biology
- Workplaces: University of Colorado at Boulder

Edwin H. McConkey is an American biologist. As of 2004, he is a professor emeritus at the department for Molecular, Cellular, and Developmental Biology at the University of Colorado at Boulder, Colorado.

His contributions to taxonomy include the original description the northern subspecies of mole skink, Plestiodon egregius similis.

== Education ==
- Bachelor of Science from the University of Florida in 1949.
- Master of Science from the University of Florida in 1951.

== Bibliography ==
- (1976) Protein Synthesis: a Series of Advances ISBN 0-8247-1464-4.
- (1993) Human Genetics: The Molecular Revolution (The Jones and Bartlett Series in Biology) ISBN 0-86720-854-6.
- (2004) How the Human Genome Works ISBN 0-7637-2384-3.
