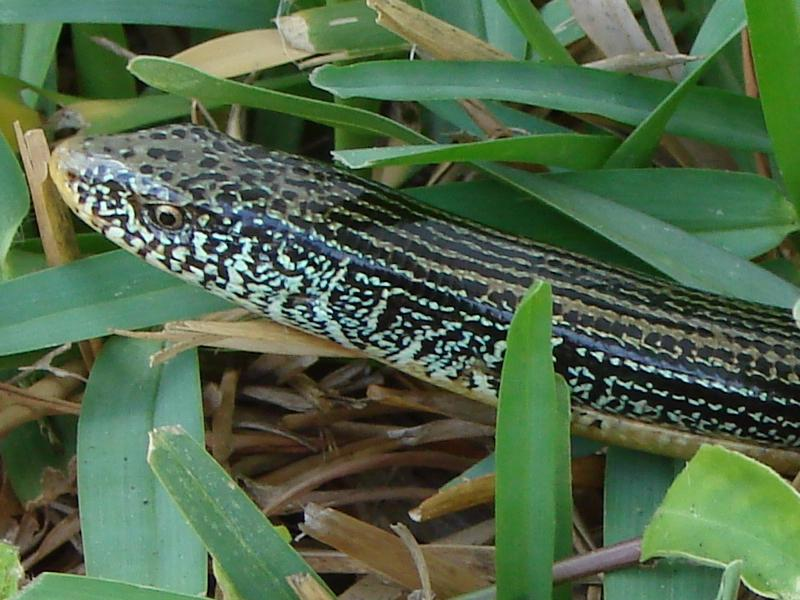

Conservation status
- Least Concern (IUCN 3.1)

Scientific classification
- Kingdom: Animalia
- Phylum: Chordata
- Class: Reptilia
- Order: Squamata
- Suborder: Anguimorpha
- Family: Anguidae
- Genus: Ophisaurus
- Species: O. ventralis

Binomial name
- Ophisaurus ventralis (Linnaeus, 1766)
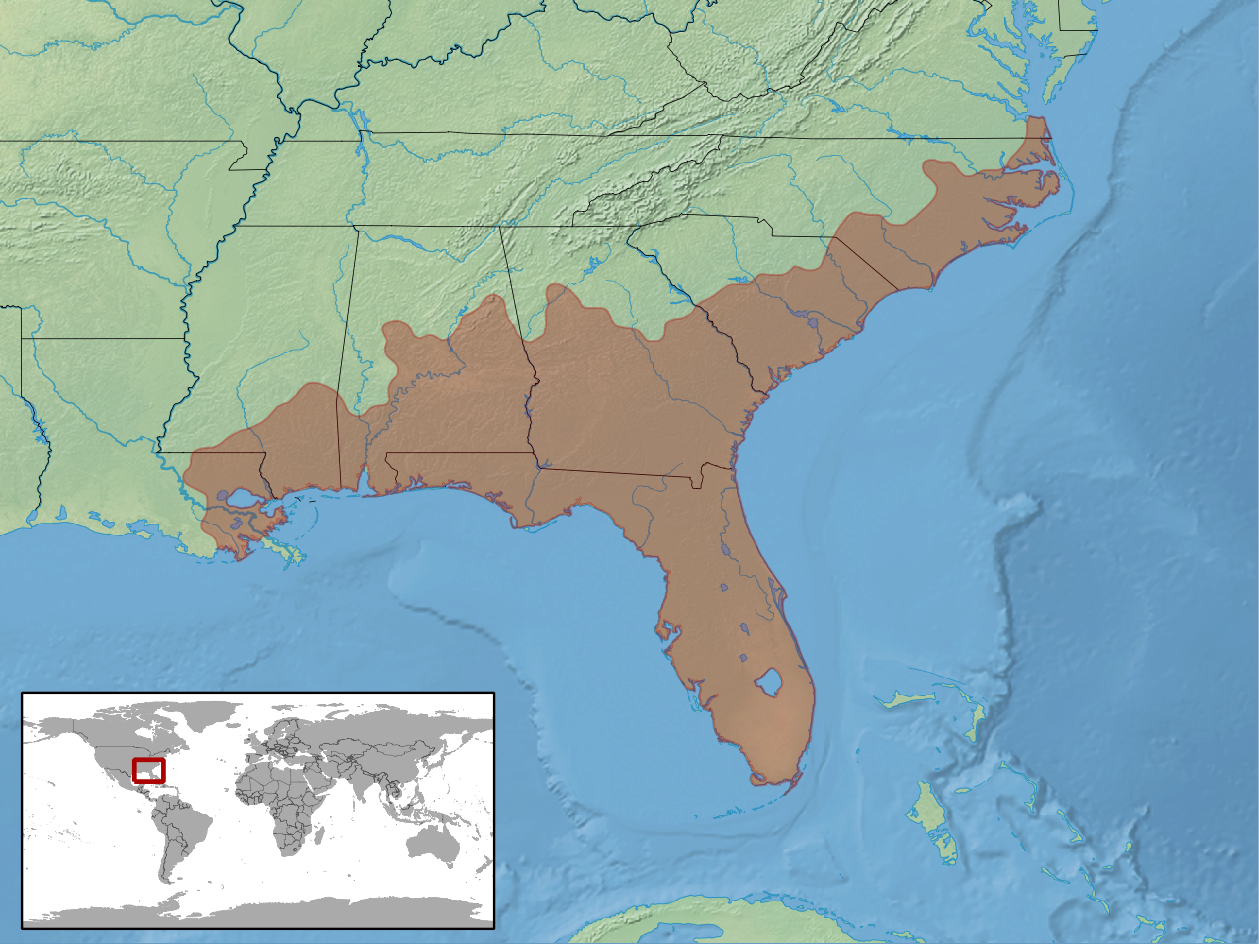

Synonyms
- Anguis ventralis Linnaeus, 1766; Ophisaurus ventralis — Daudin, 1803; Ophisaurus ventralis — Cope, 1900

= Eastern glass lizard =

Species of reptile

The eastern glass lizard (Ophisaurus ventralis) is a species of legless lizard in the family Anguidae and the longest and heaviest species of glass lizards in the genus Ophisaurus, endemic to the Southeastern United States. The streamlined, legless species is often confused with snakes. Glass lizards differ from snakes as they possess a moveable eyelid and an external ear opening as well as a lateral groove that separates the different types of scales on the animal, while all three of these features are absent in snakes. Snakes also have flexible jaws while lizards do not. Ventralis comes from the Latin "venter" meaning belly; this is in reference to the snake-like movement.

== Description ==
Adults of O. ventralis grow to 46–108 cm (18–43 in) in total length, although the head-body length is only 30.5 cm (12.0 in) at most. There are 99 or more scales along the lateral groove. In this species, no dark longitudinal stripes are present below the lateral groove or under the tail, and there is no distinct mid-dorsal stripe. The tail serves purposes such as balance and defense. The neck is marked with a series of mostly vertical, or highly irregular, white marks, with white markings on posterior corners of scales. Palatine teeth are prominent. Dorsally, older specimens have a pattern consisting of numerous longitudinal dark lines or dashes. Occasionally, similar parallel lines cover the entire mid-dorsal area. Older adults may be greenish above and yellow below; this is the only Ophisaurus species that may have a greenish appearance. Juveniles are khaki-colored and usually have two dark stripes that run down the back. O. ventralis are commonly mistaken as a species of snake because they lack limbs. Unlike snakes, they have moveable eyelids, external ear openings located behind their eyes, and inflexible jaws. The three extant species of Ophisaurus that live in North America can be distinguished by their differences in number of teeth and sizes of skulls from skeletal analysis.

No subspecies are currently recognized.

== Habitat ==
Eastern glass lizards are a common species near wetlands and moist soils. O. ventralis habitat consists of flatwoods adjacent to wetlands with sandy soils. They heavily rely on prescribed fire to maintain their habitat. They have also been found in tidal areas such as coastal dunes because they are resistant to salty conditions. Eastern glass lizards are most active during the day and can be found foraging in open habitats but also like to take refuge beneath debris.

A study in 2020 found O. ventralis using a crayfish burrow as habitat in southeastern Mississippi. Various invertebrates and vertebrates are known to use these burrows but this is the first time a lizard species has been documented using a crayfish burrow. Limited research has been done but it could represent more widespread behavior. Direct mortality due to prescribed fire is of concern to land managers using fire as a management tool in the eastern glass lizard's habitat.

== Distribution ==
O. ventralis is commonly found from extreme southeastern Virginia to south Florida and west to Louisiana. They are restricted to the coastal plains of the southeastern United States, and populations are restricted by the Mississippi River. Isolated records exist of its occurrence in Oklahoma and Missouri. Distribution of O. ventralis in these areas goes back to the Pleistocene, as several fossils have been found in Florida.

== Diet ==
O. ventralis are opportunistic feeders that will eat almost anything that may cross their path, including insects, small mammals, eggs, small birds and sometimes even fruits or vegetation. Example's of prey they may feed on are: grasshoppers, crickets and beetles, spiders, small mice, snails, and the eggs of other reptiles and ground-nesting birds. Some eastern glass lizards have been documented as cannibalistic, consuming smaller conspecifics. They rely on their sense of smell and sharp eyesight to hunt during the day. Unlike snakes, glass lizards do not have flexible jaws, and this limits the size of prey items they can consume. They forage both above ground and underground in burrows.

== Predators and predator avoidance ==
Common predators of the eastern glass lizard include skunks, raccoons, foxes, snakes, and cats. They have the ability of tail autotomy, meaning their tail breaks off upon restraint. Their tail fragment will continue to writhe for several minutes after detachment to distract the predator and allow them to escape.

== Reproduction ==
O. ventralis is oviparous and lays around 5–15 eggs in late April to mid July. The eggs have an incubation time of 40-65 days and will tend to hatch around late summer. Eggs are usually laid under cover or in depressions in sandy or loamy soil. Females will encircle their clutch but may retreat when approached and generally do not defend their eggs. However, they will gather them back up if they are scattered around. Egg average mass is 759 mg (11.71 gr) and length is 18 mm (0.71 in).

== Gallery ==
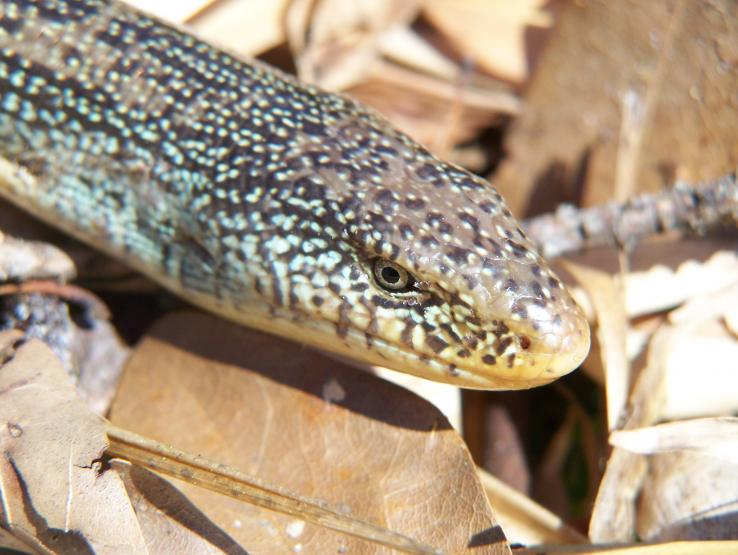
Male in South Carolina

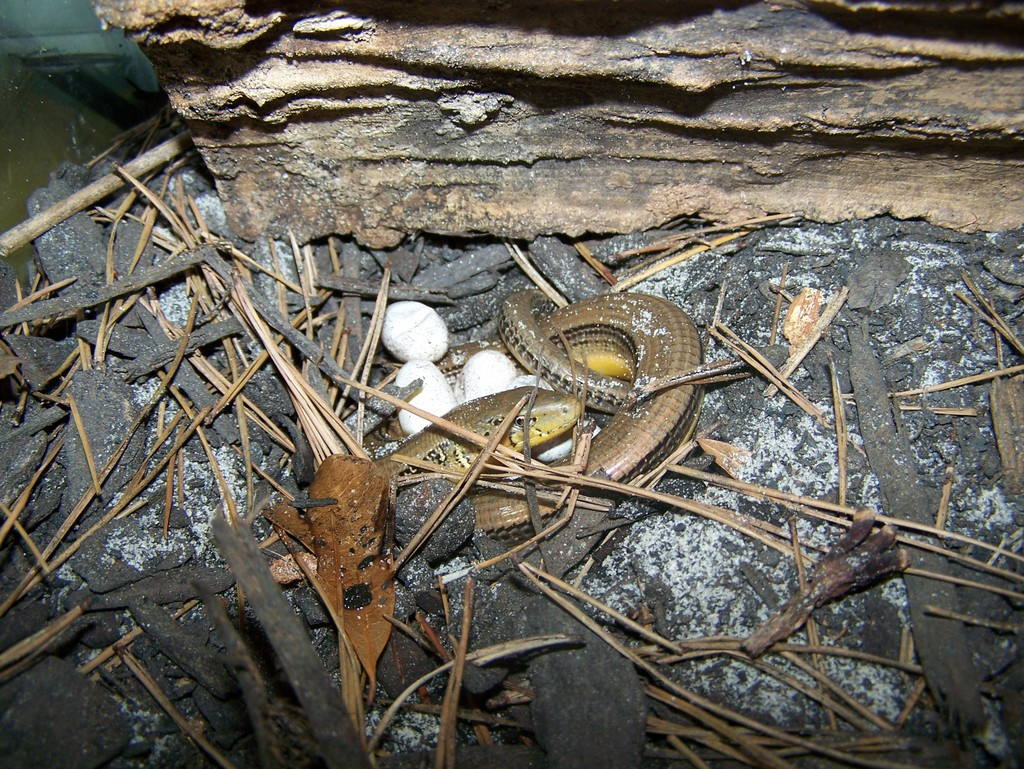
Female with eggs

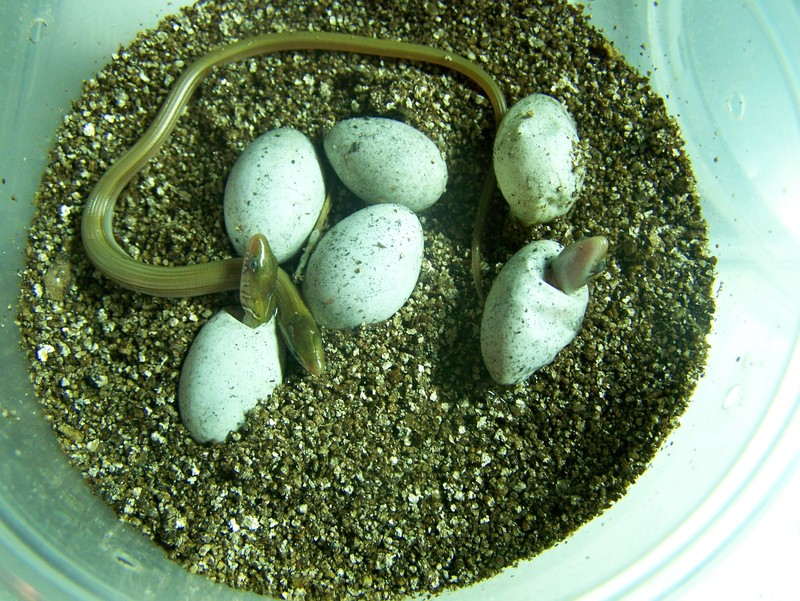
Hatchlings

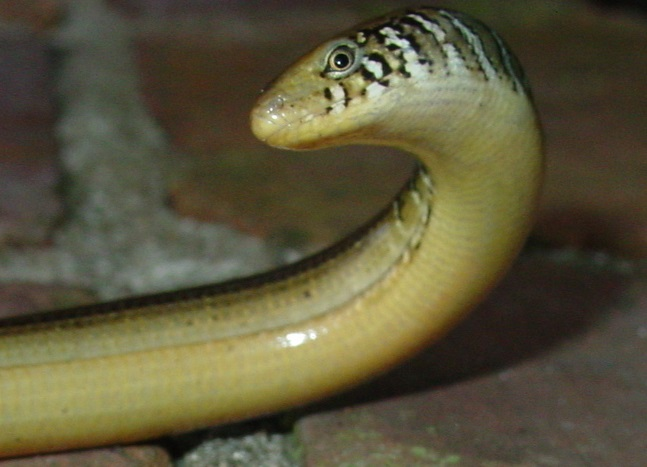
In Florida

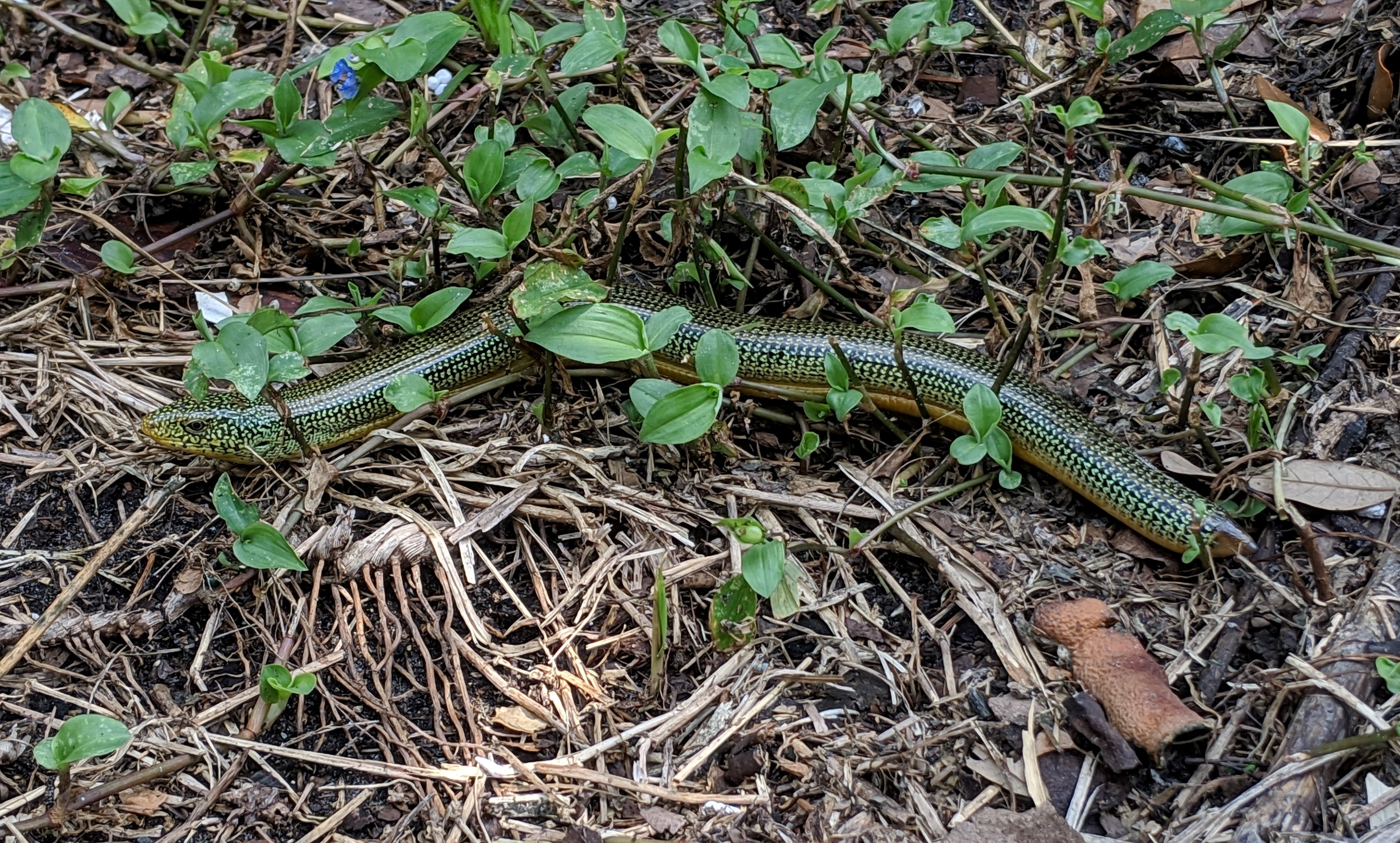
With tail broken off

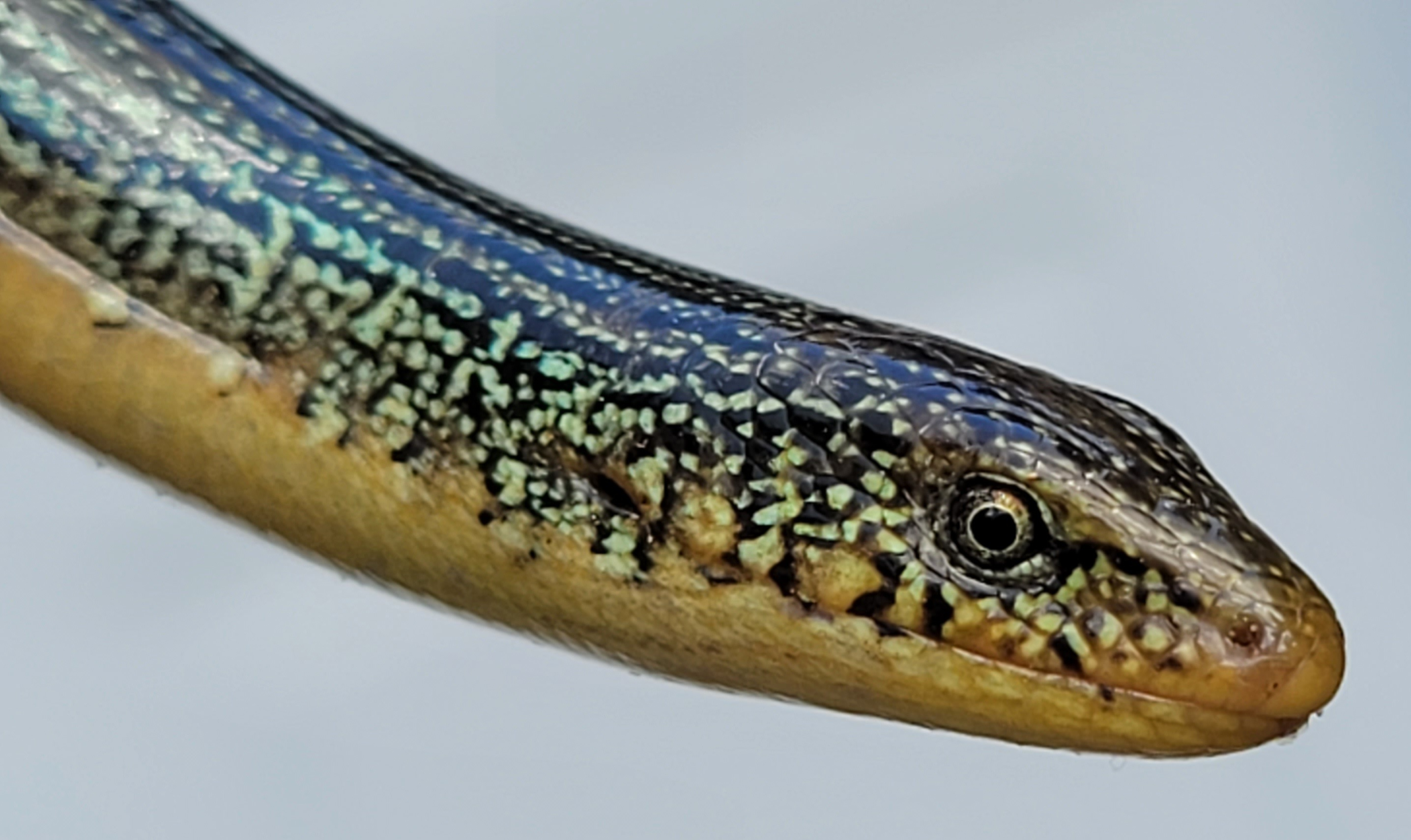
Eastern glass lizard - Valdosta GA, USA
