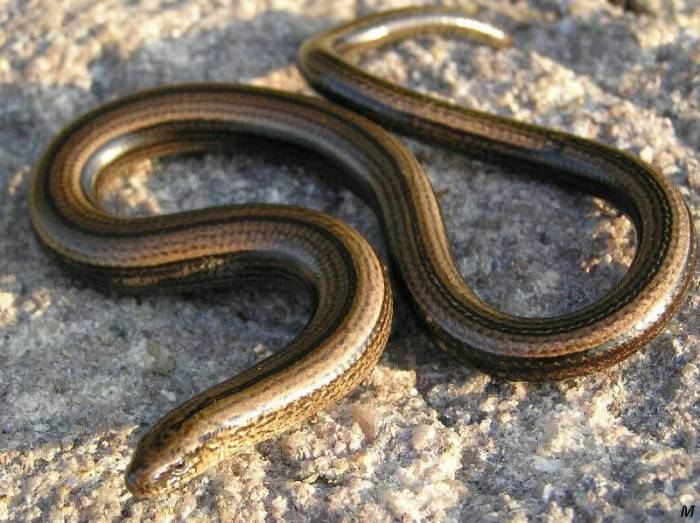
- Anguis fragilis (slow worm)
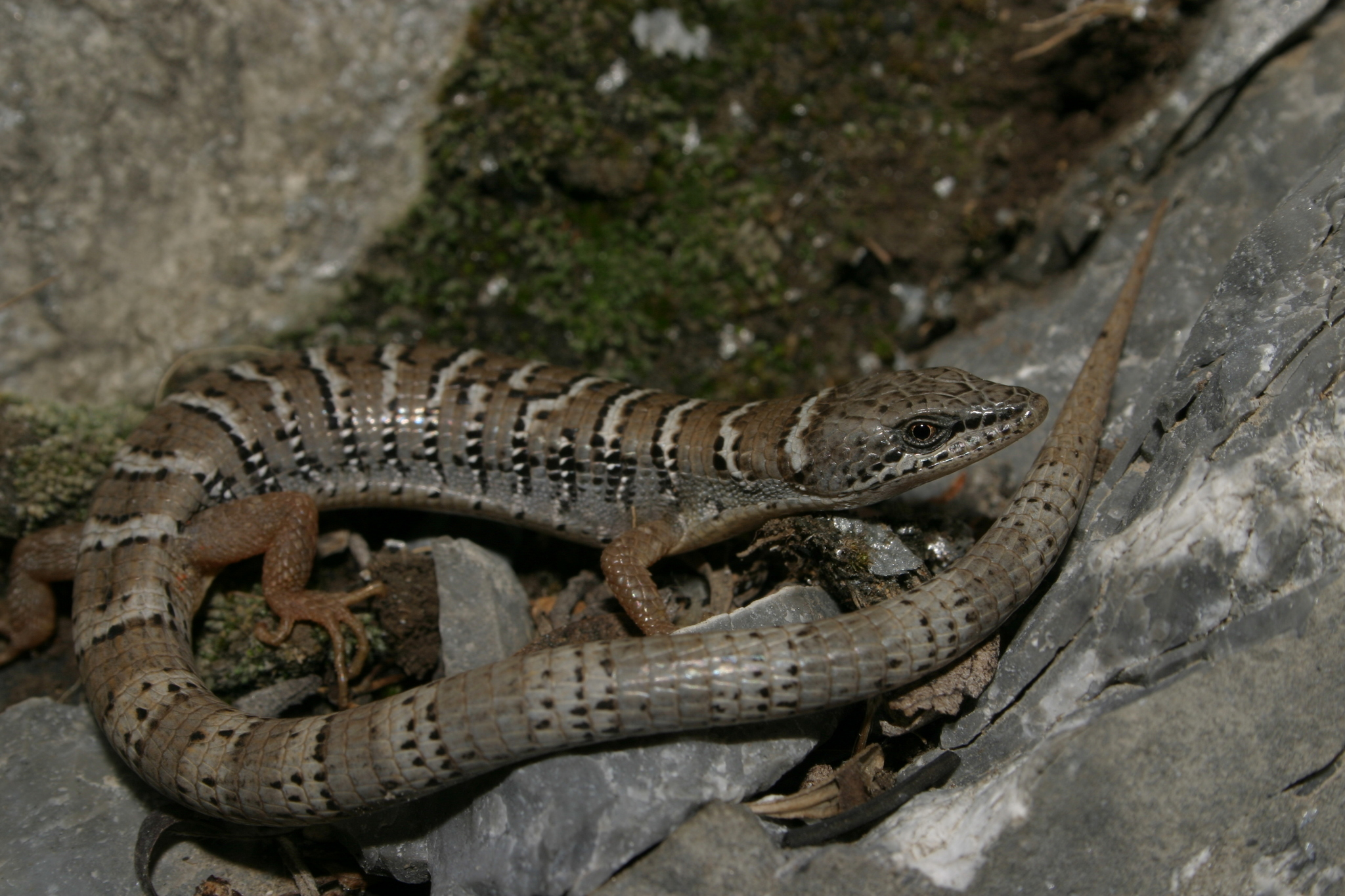
- Gerrhonotus parvus

Scientific classification
- Domain: Eukaryota
- Kingdom: Animalia
- Phylum: Chordata
- Class: Reptilia
- Order: Squamata
- Clade: Anguioidea
- Family: Anguidae; Gray, 1825

Subfamilies
- Anguinae; Gerrhonotinae; †Glyptosaurinae

= Anguidae =

Anguidae Temporal range: Campanian–Recent

Family of lizards

Anguidae refers to a large and diverse family of lizards native to the Northern Hemisphere. It contains 9 genera and 89 extant species. Common characteristics of this group include a reduced supratemporal arch, striations on the medial faces of tooth crowns, osteoderms, and a lateral fold in the skin of most taxa. The group is divided into two living subfamilies, the legless Anguinae, which contains slow worms and glass lizards, among others, found across the Northern Hemisphere, and Gerrhonotinae, which contains the alligator lizards, native to North and Central America. The family Diploglossidae (which contains the galliwasps) was also formerly included.

== Morphology and reproduction ==
Anguids have hard osteoderms beneath their scales giving them an armored appearance. Members of the subfamily Anguinae have reduced or absent limbs, giving them a snake-like appearance, while members of Gerrohonotinae are fully limbed. Body type varies among species, with sizes ranging from 10 cm to 1.5 m. The group includes oviparous and viviparous species, both of which can be observed in a single genus at times.

== Feeding and habitat ==
Anguids are known carnivorous or insectivorous foragers, feeding primarily on insects, although larger species have been known to feed on small reptiles and amphibians. They inhabit a wide range of different habitats across the globe, from arid to tropical environments. Most known species are terrestrial or semifossorial, with the exception of one arboreal genus: Abronia.

== Evolution ==
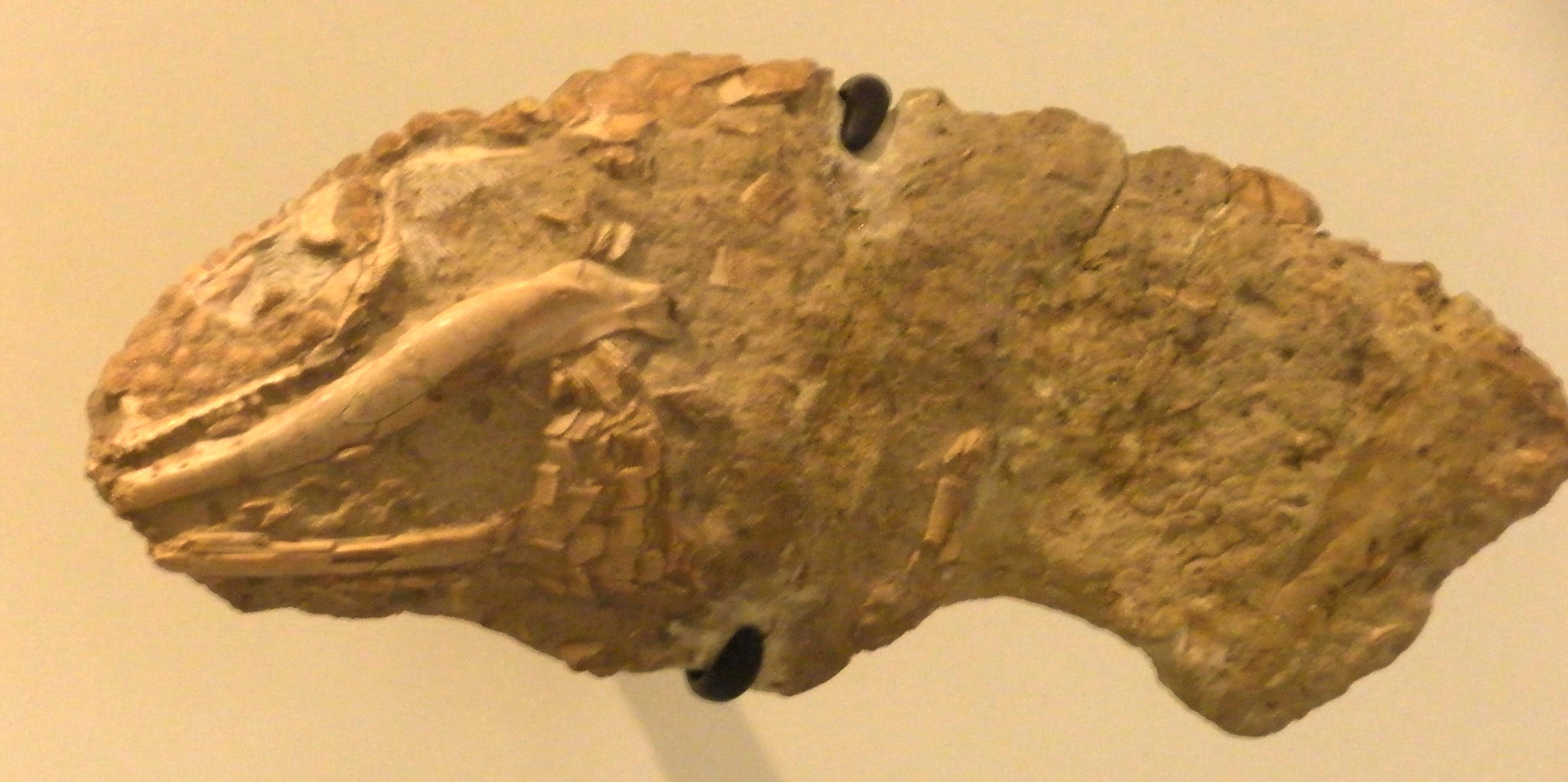
Helodermoides tuberculatus fossil

Anguids have a relatively good fossil record and are relatively common as fossils in the Late Cretaceous and Paleogene of western North America. The oldest known anguid, with the most complete fossil record of any lizard, is Odaxosaurus, a member of the extinct anguid subfamily Glyptosaurinae, from the late Campanian of Canada, about 75 million years ago. Odaxosaurus and other Late Cretaceous anguids already exhibit many features found in living anguids, including chisel-like teeth and armor plates in the skin, suggesting a long evolutionary history for the group. Anguids were particularly diverse during the Paleocene and Eocene in North America; some species, such as those belonging to Glyptosaurinae, grew to large size and evolved a highly specialized crushing dentition. The long fossil record for the Anguidae in North America suggests that the group probably evolved in North America during the Cretaceous before dispersing to Europe in the Paleogene.

This figure shows a former phylogeny of the anguid subfamilies based on maximum-likelihood analysis of mitochondrial DNA sequence data. Diploglossinae and Anniellinae are now considered distinct families.

== Classification ==
Family ANGUIDAE

- Subfamily Anguinae
  - Genus Anguis - slowworms (5 species)
  - Genus Dopasia - Asian glass lizards (7 species)
  - Genus Hyalosaurus - North African glass lizard (1 species)
  - Genus Ophisaurus - American glass lizards (13 species)
  - Genus Pseudopus - scheltopusik (1* species)
- Subfamily Gerrhonotinae - alligator lizards
  - Genus Barisia - alligator lizards (7 species)
  - Genus Gerrhonotus - alligator lizards (9 species)
  - Genus Abronia - arboreal alligator lizards (39 species)
  - Genus Elgaria - western alligator lizards (7 species)
- Subfamily †Glyptosaurinae

Genetic evidence indicates that Diploglossinae lies outside the clade containing Anguinae, Gerrhonotinae, and the family Anniellidae, Therefore, it has been placed in own separate family Diploglossidae.

*extant individuals
