= List of reptiles of Poland =

This is a list of reptile species found in Poland

== Testudines ==
Family: Emydidae

- European pond turtle (Emys orbicularis)
- Pond slider (Trachemys scripta) - introduced species
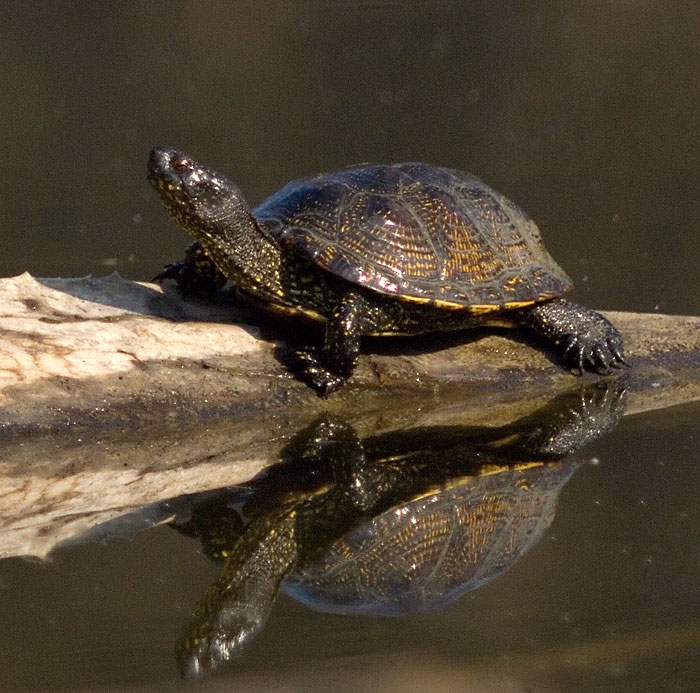
  European pond turtle

== Squamata ==
Family: Lacertidae

- Sand lizard (Lacerta agilis)
- European green lizard (Lacerta viridis) - most likely locally extinct in Poland
- Viviparous lizard (Zootoca vivipara)
- European wall lizard (Podarcis muralis) - cryptogenic species

Family: Anguidae

- Slow worm (Anguis fragilis)
- Eastern slowworm (Anguis colchica)
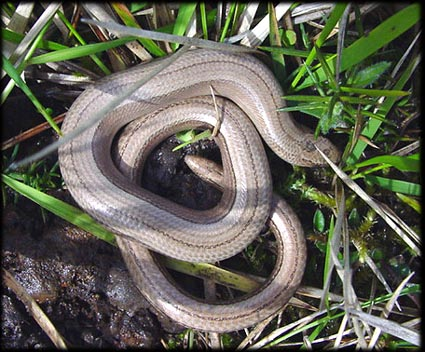
Slow worm

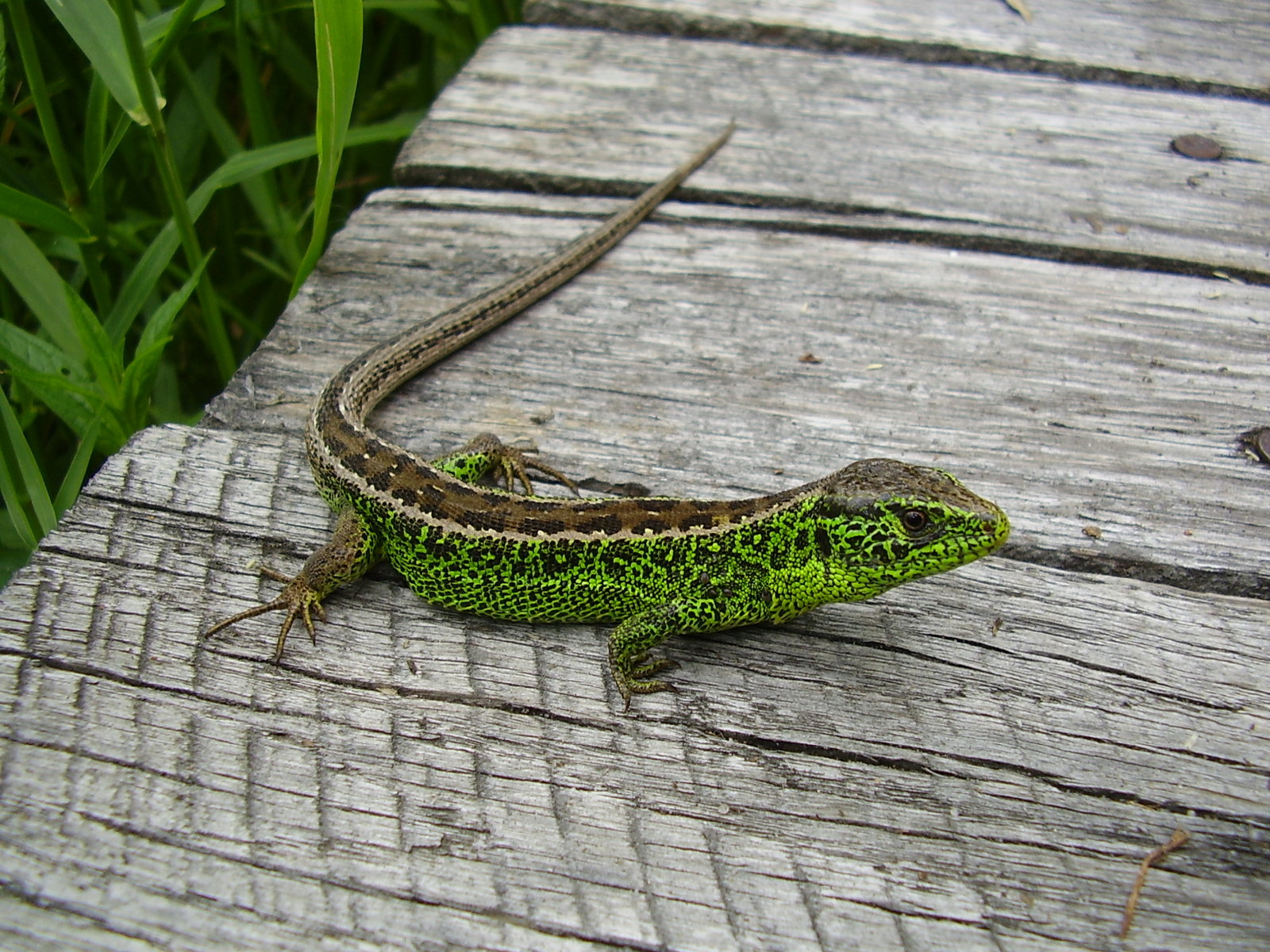
Sand lizard

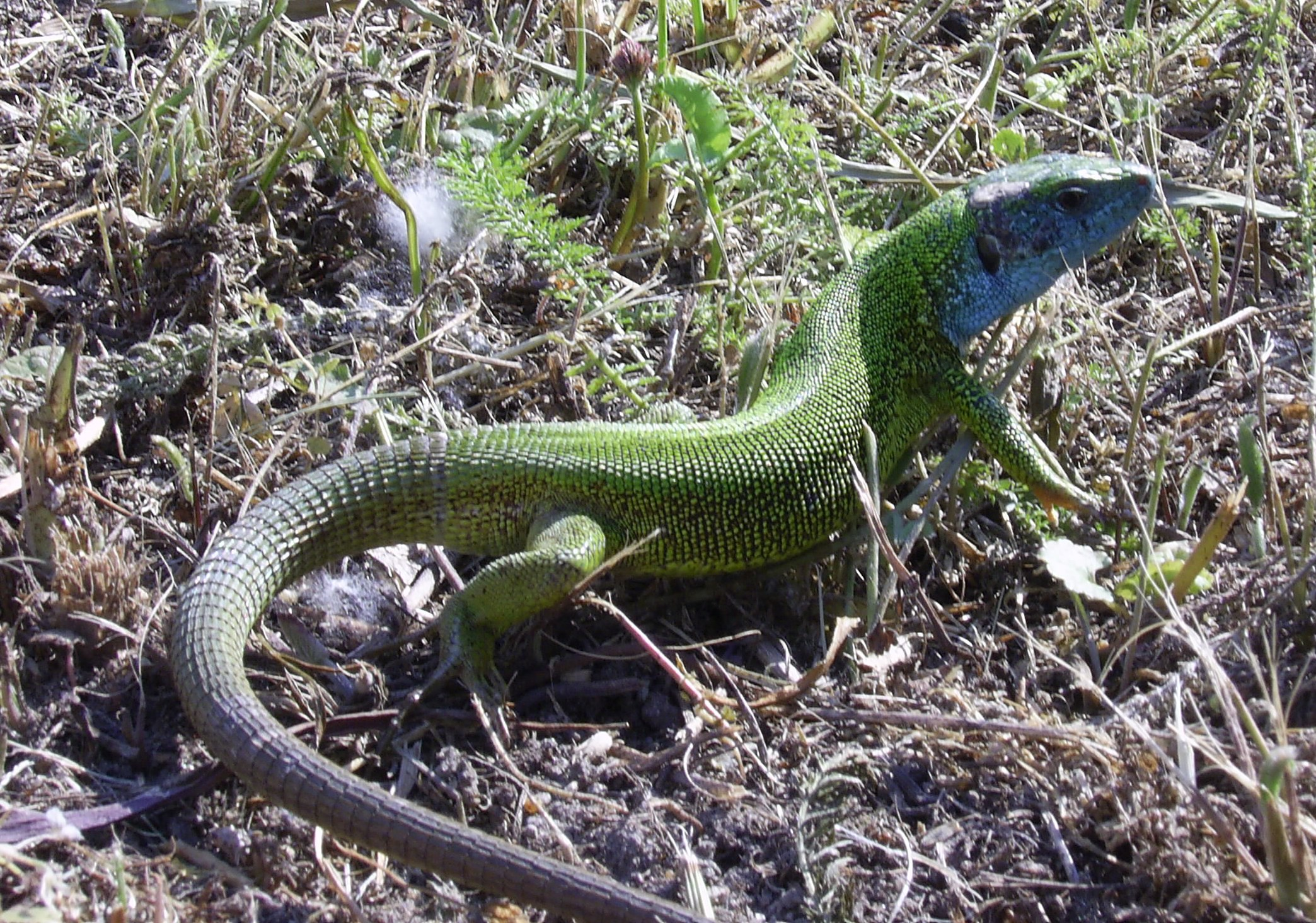
European green lizard

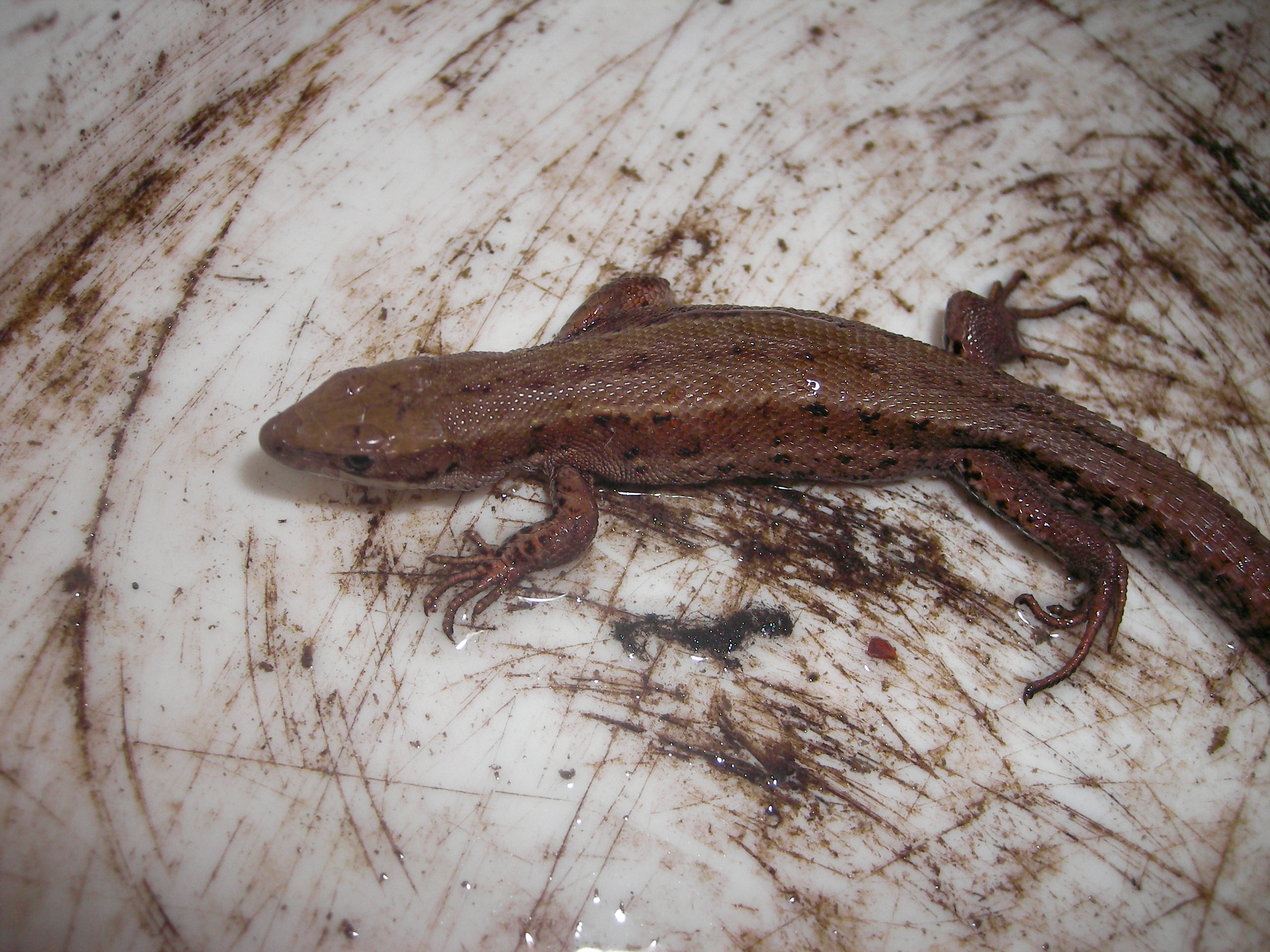
Viviparous lizard

Family: Colubridae

- Grass snake (Natrix natrix)
- Dice snake (Natrix tessellata)
- Aesculapian snake (Zamenis longissimus)
- Smooth snake (Coronella austriaca)

Family: Viperidae

- Common European adder (Vipera berus)
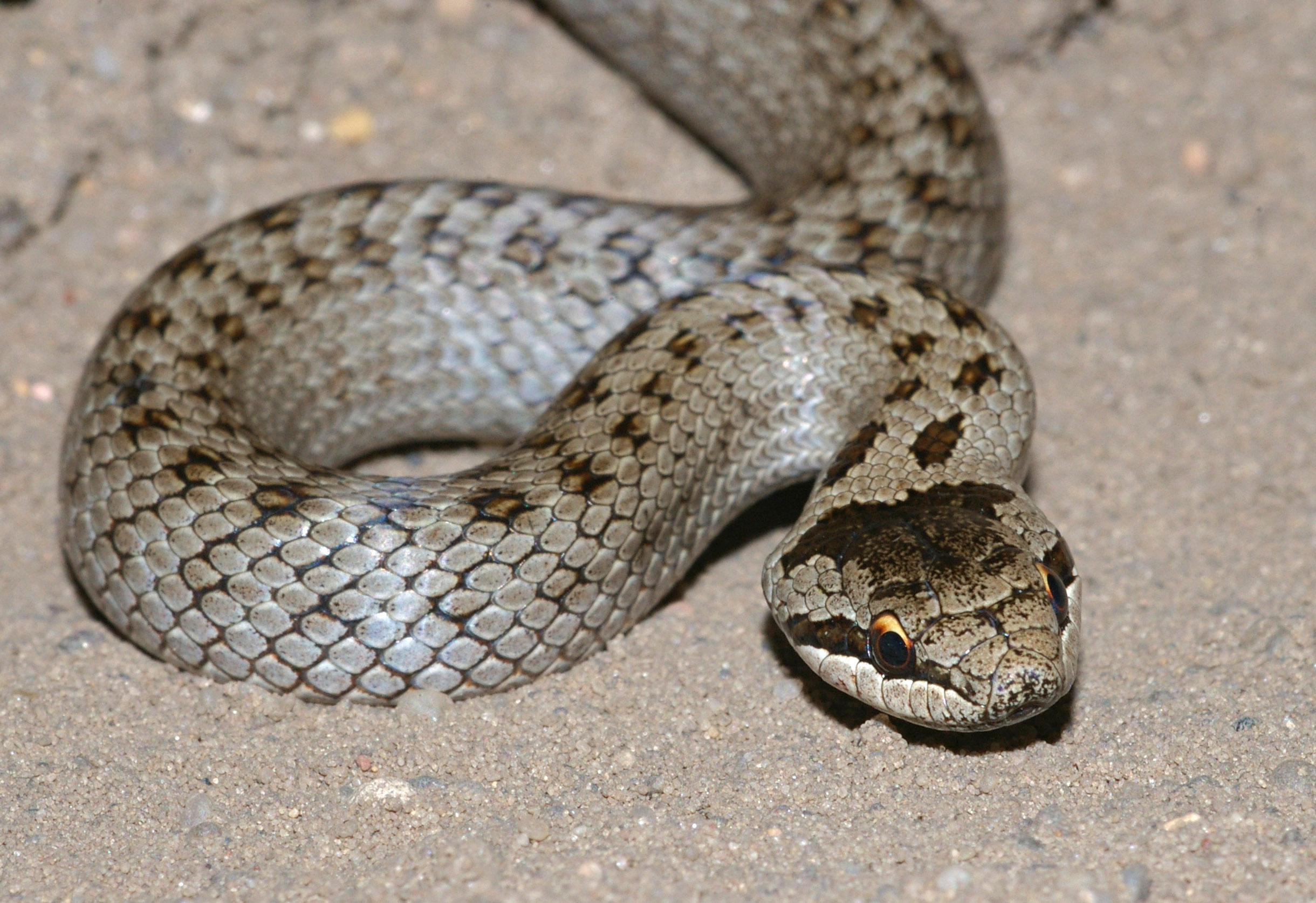
Smooth snake

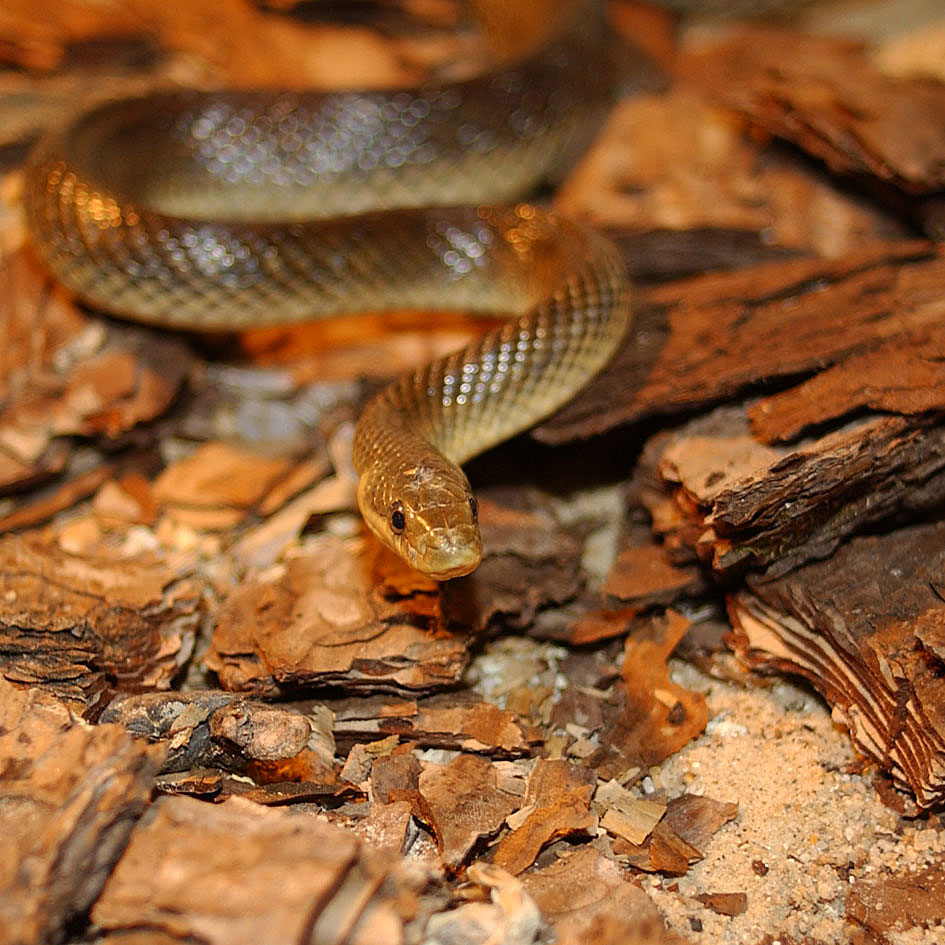
Aescalupian snake

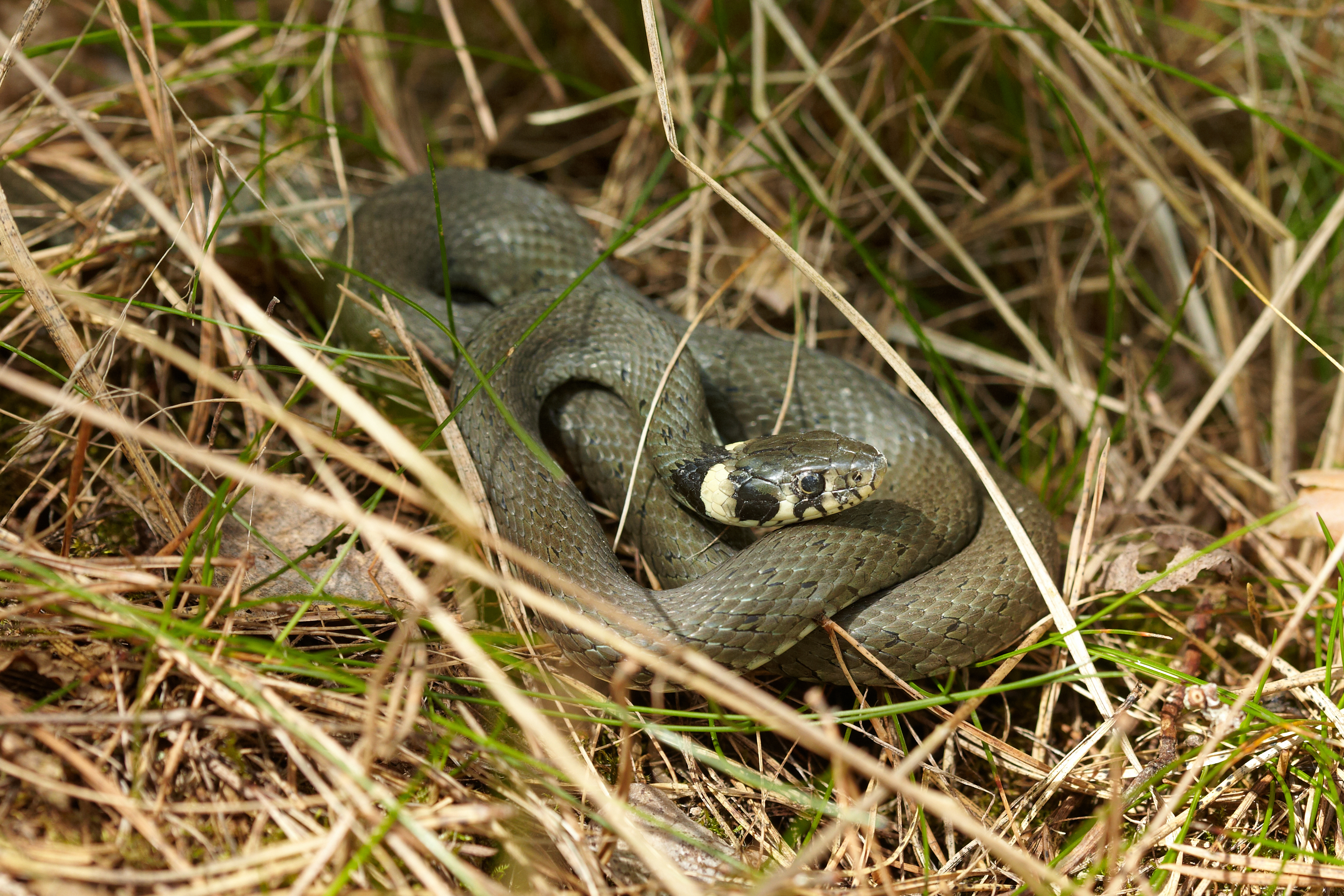
Grass snake

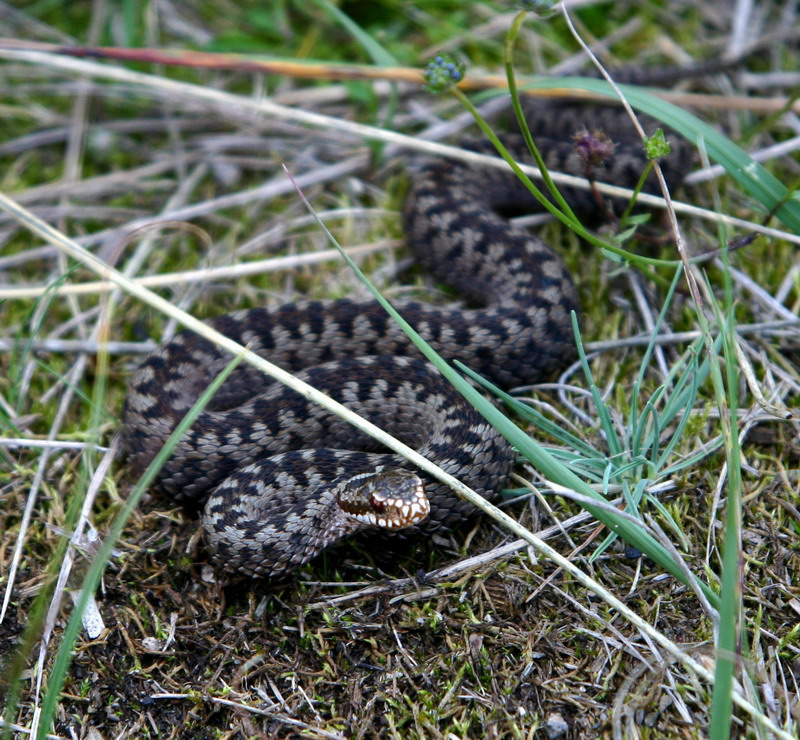
Common European adder

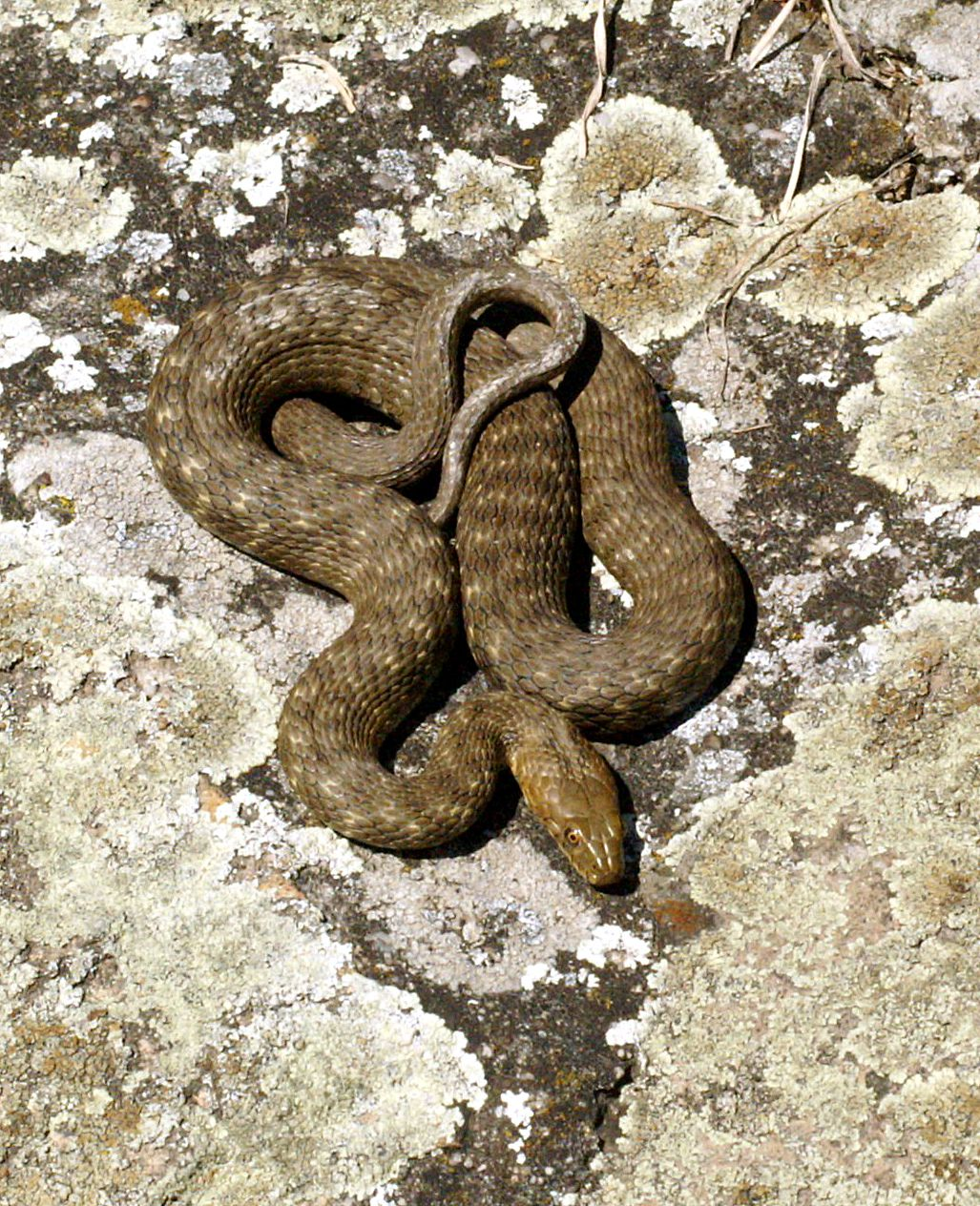
Dice snake

== See also ==
Fauna of Poland
