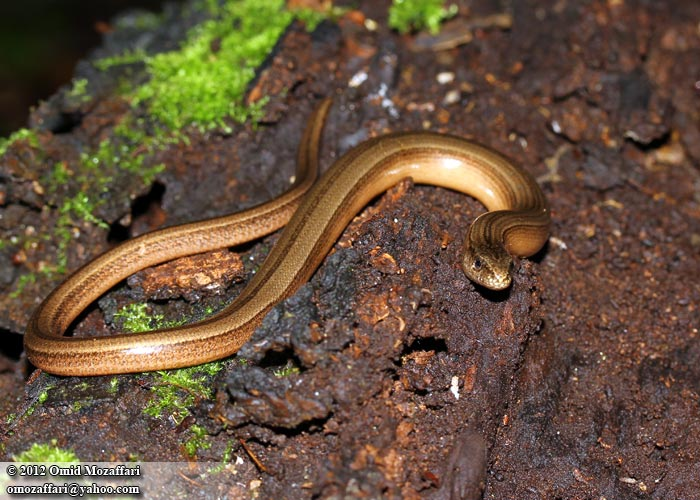

Scientific classification
- Kingdom: Animalia
- Phylum: Chordata
- Class: Reptilia
- Order: Squamata
- Suborder: Anguimorpha
- Family: Anguidae
- Genus: Anguis
- Species: A. colchica

Binomial name
- Anguis colchica (Nordmann, 1840)
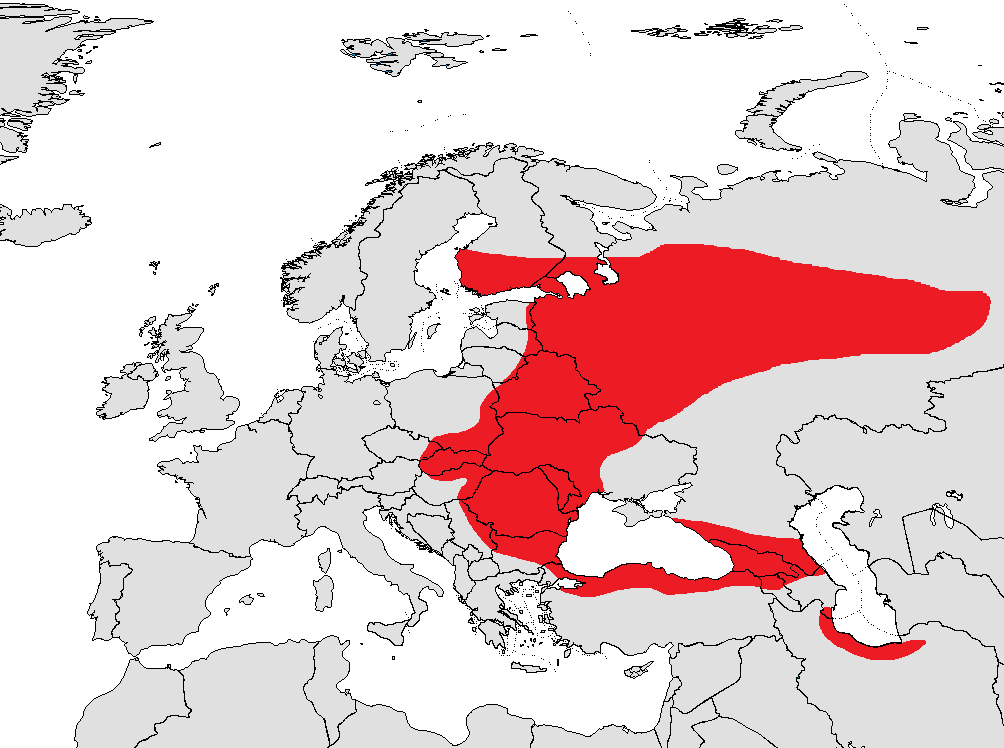
- A. colchica range

= Anguis colchica =

Species of lizard

Anguis colchica, the eastern slow worm, is a species of legless lizard in the family Anguidae found in eastern and northern Europe and Asia. It is easily confused with the common slow worm, due to their physical similarities, and the proximity of their distribution.

== Taxonomy ==
The eastern slow worm is part of the slow worm species complex. It was traditionally written as A. f. colchica, a subspecies of the common slow worm, but was later distinguished as a separate species, along with Anguis graeca, Anguis veronensis and Anguis cephalonnica.

== Habitat ==
Eastern slow worms live primarily in areas with partially closed, forest or shrub vegetation. They can be found most often on the edges of forests, forest clearings, and sometimes on tourist trails, where they can lie down to bask in the sun. They utilise stone piles, stone fences, coarse woody debris, and even the burrows of some rodents as hiding places. They commonly venture into gardens close to their habitat.

== Behaviour ==
Eastern slow worms are mostly crepuscular animals, but are sometimes found to be active during the daytime, especially after rain. Their diet consists of small, slow moving invertebrates such as earthworms, slugs and insect larvae. The mating season of the species is usually between the end of April, and the beginning of June. Slow worms hibernate during the winter, starting from mid-October. During this time, they settle under logs, roots, in rock crevices or in rodent passages.
