= Cryptogenic =

Cryptogenic refers to something of obscure or unknown origin. It is commonly used to refer to:

- Cryptogenic disease
- Cryptogenic species
- Cryptogenic stroke
