= Log-linear =

Log-linear can mean:

- Log-linear model, in mathematics
- Log-linear time, in computational complexity
