= Stephen Fienberg =

American statistician (1942–2016)

- Born: Stephen Elliott Fienberg; 27 November 1942; Toronto, Ontario, Canada
- Died: 14 December 2016 (aged 74); Pittsburgh, Pennsylvania, U.S.
- Education: Harvard University (PhD); University of Toronto (BSc)
- Known for: Log-linear models, Contingency tables
- Awards: COPSS Presidents' Award, R. A. Fisher Lectureship
- Scientific career
- Fields: Statistics
- Workplaces: Carnegie Mellon University
- Thesis: The Estimation of Cell Probabilities in Two-Way Contingency Tables (1968)
- Doctoral advisor: Frederick Mosteller
- Doctoral students: Edoardo Airoldi; Jana Asher; Elena Erosheva; Aleksandra Slavković
- Other notable students: David Blei (postdoc)

External videos
- “COPSS Awards and Fisher Lecture”, Amstat Videos, September 24, 2015

Stephen Elliott Fienberg (27 November 1942 – 14 December 2016) was a professor emeritus (formerly the Maurice Falk University Professor of Statistics and Social Science) in the Department of Statistics, the Machine Learning Department, Heinz College, and Cylab at Carnegie Mellon University. Fienberg was the founding co-editor of the Annual Review of Statistics and Its Application and of the Journal of Privacy and Confidentiality.

== Early life and education ==
Born in Toronto, Ontario, Fienberg earned a Bachelor of Science degree in Mathematics and Statistics from the University of Toronto in 1964, a Master of Arts degree in statistics in 1965, and a Ph.D. in statistics in 1968 from Harvard University for research supervised by Frederick Mosteller.

== Career and research ==
Fienberg was on the Carnegie Mellon University faculty from 1980 and served as Dean of the Dietrich College of Humanities and Social Sciences. He became a U.S. citizen in 1998.

Fienberg was one of the foremost social statisticians in the world, and was well known for his work in log-linear modeling for categorical data, the statistical analysis of network data, and methodology for disclosure limitation. He was also an expert on forensic science, the only statistician to serve on the National Commission on Forensic Science.

He authored more than 400 publications, including six books, advised more than 30 Ph.D. students, and could claim more than 105 descendants in his mathematical genealogy. His publications included books on discrete multivariate analysis categorical data analysis, US census adjustment, and forensic science.

He was a founder and editor-in-chief of the Journal of Privacy and Confidentiality. and of the Annual Review of Statistics and Its Application.

=== Awards and honors ===
Fienberg was an elected member of the National Academy of Sciences, an elected fellow of the Royal Society of Canada, an elected fellow of the American Academy of Arts and Sciences, a fellow of the American Association for the Advancement of Science, a fellow of the American Statistical Association and a fellow of the Institute of Mathematical Statistics.

He was a recipient of the Committee of Presidents of Statistical Societies (COPSS) Presidents' Award in 1982. In 2002, Fienberg received the Samuel S. Wilks Award from the American Statistical Association for his distinguished career in statistics. He received the inaugural Statistical Society of Canada's Lise Manchester Award in 2008 in recognition of his application of statistics to problems of public interest. In 2015, he received the Jerome Sacks Award for Cross-Disciplinary Research from the National Institute of Statistical Sciences, and the R. A. Fisher Lectureship from COPSS in 2015. He was awarded the Zellner Medal by the International Society for Bayesian Analysis (ISBA) in 2016. In 2009 Fienberg was recipient of the American Statistical Association's Founders Award.

=== Selected publications ===
- Bishop, Y. M. M., Fienberg, S. E. and Holland, P. W. (1975). Discrete Multivariate Analysis: Theory and Practice. M.I.T. Press, Cambridge, MA. Paperback edition (1977). A Citation Classic. Reprinted, by Springer-Verlag, New York (2007).
- Fienberg, S. E. and Hinkley, D. V., eds. (1980). R. A. Fisher: An Appreciation. Springer-Verlag, NY. 1st reprint 1989; 2nd reprint by Springer-Verlag, NY (2012).
- Fienberg, S. E. (1980). The Analysis of Cross-classified Categorical Data. 2nd Edition. M.I.T. Press, Cambridge, MA. A Citation Classic. Reprinted, by Springer-Verlag, New York (2007).
- DeGroot, M. H., Fienberg, S. E., and Kadane, J. B., eds. (1986). Statistics and the Law. Wiley, New York. Wiley Classics Paperback edition (1994).
- Goldenberg, A., Zheng, A. X., Fienberg, S. E. and Airoldi, E. M. (2010) A Survey of Statistical Network Models. Now Publishers Inc.

== Personal life ==
Stephen Fienberg was married to Joyce Fienberg and had two sons, Anthony and Howard, and six grandchildren. He died on 14 December 2016. Joyce Fienberg died on 27 October 2018. She was one of eleven worshippers murdered during the Pittsburgh synagogue shooting at the Tree of Life – Or L'Simcha synagogue in the Squirrel Hill neighborhood of Pittsburgh, Pennsylvania.
