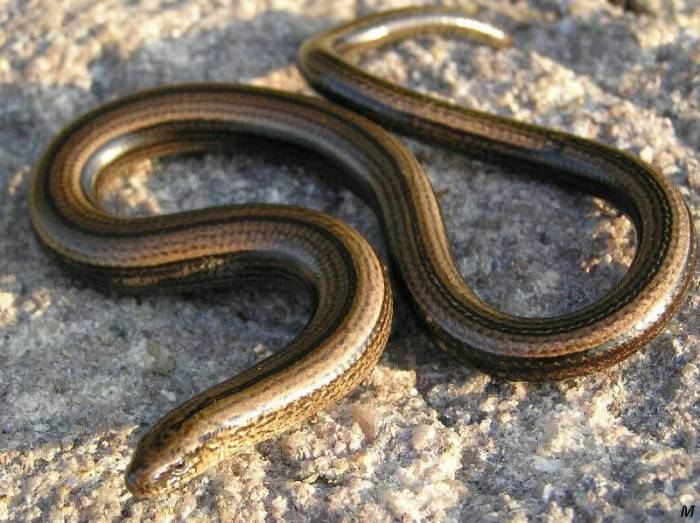

Conservation status
- Least Concern (IUCN 3.1)

Scientific classification
- Kingdom: Animalia
- Phylum: Chordata
- Class: Reptilia
- Order: Squamata
- Suborder: Anguimorpha
- Family: Anguidae
- Genus: Anguis
- Species: A. fragilis

Binomial name
- Anguis fragilis Linnaeus, 1758
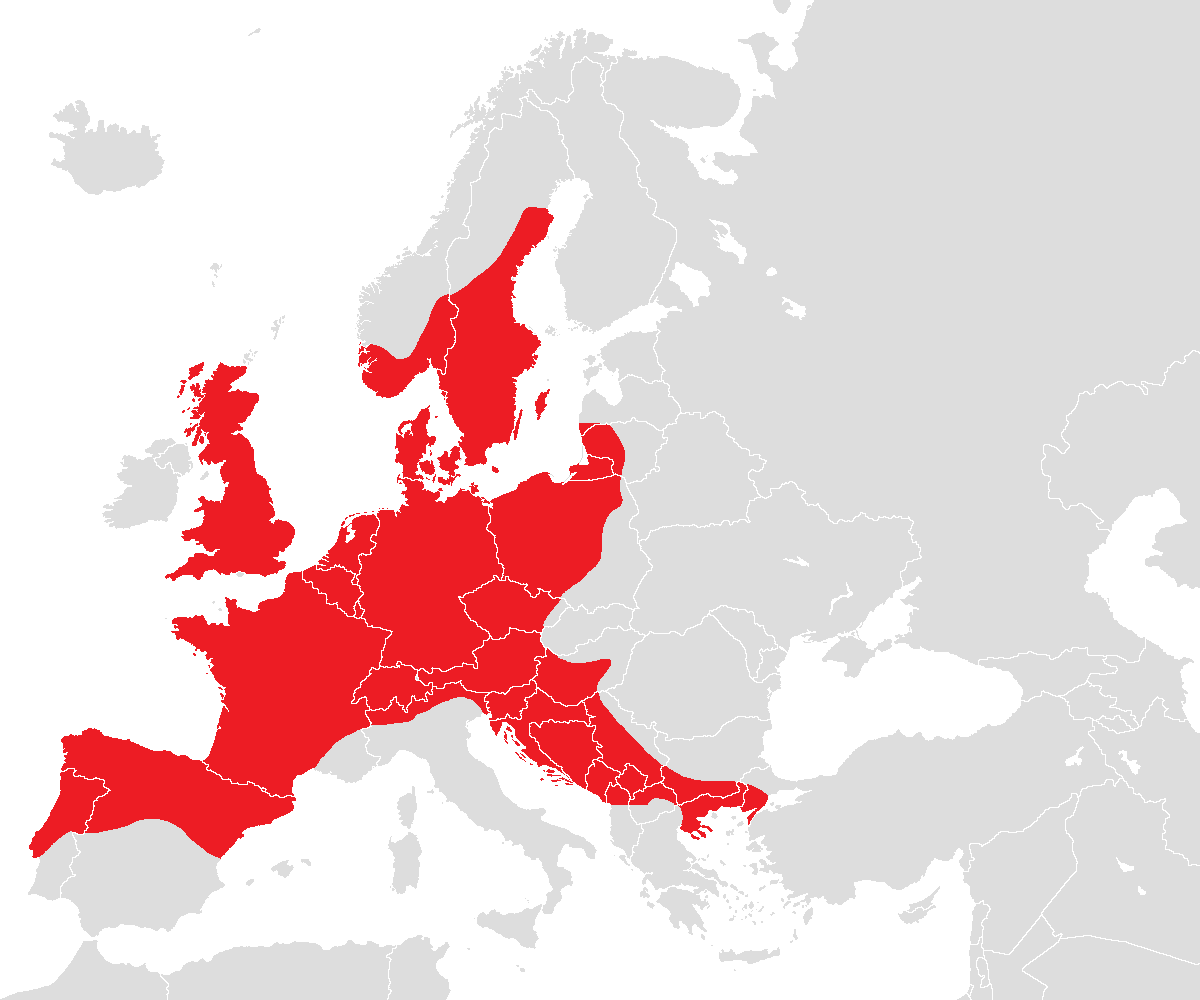
- Range of A. fragilis

= Common slow worm =

Species of legless lizard

The common slow worm (Anguis fragilis) is a non-venomous species of legless lizard native to Europe. It is also called a deaf adder, blindworm, or regionally, a long-cripple, steelworm, and hazelworm.

Despite its name, the common slow worm is neither a worm nor a snake.

Common slow worms are semifossorial (burrowing) lizards that spend much of their time hiding underneath objects. The skin of slow worms is smooth, with scales that do not overlap.

== Etymology ==
The "blind" in blindworm refers to the lizard's small eyes, similar to a blindsnake (although the slow worm's eyes are functional). The common slow worm, i.e. the species Anguis fragilis, is often called simply "slow worm", though all species of the species complex comprising the genus Anguis are also called "slow worms".

The name "slow worm" is only contaminated by the word "slow". In Middle English, it was written "slowurm", from Old English "slāwyrm", where slā- means 'earthworm' or 'slow worm' and wyrm means "serpent, reptile". It is related to the Norwegian slo or Swedish ormslå, of same meaning.

== Taxonomy ==
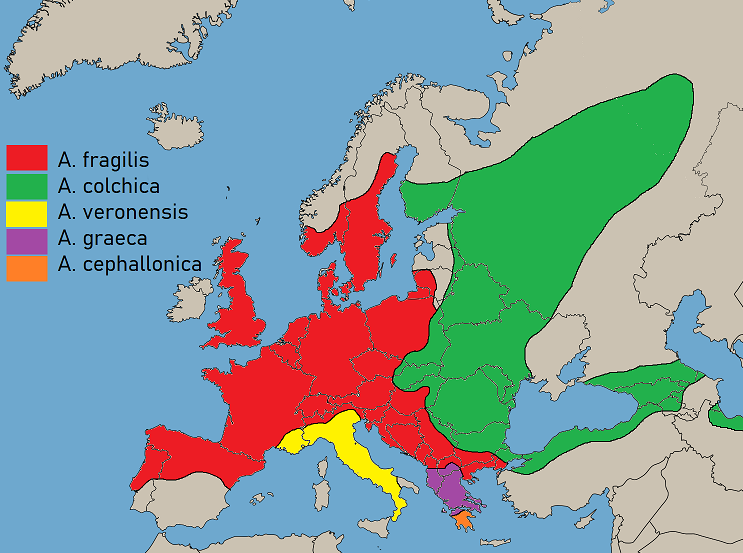
Distribution of species of European slow worms

Anguis fragilis was historically divided into two subspecies (A. f. fragilis and A. f. colchica). However, recent taxonomic classification has resulted in the categorisation of these as separate species:

- Anguis fragilis sensu stricto (found in western Europe, northern Europe, and western Balkans)
- Anguis colchica (found in eastern and northern Europe, eastern Balkans, and in western Asia)

Three more species were later distinguished from A. fragilis:

- Anguis graeca (found in southern Balkans)
- Anguis veronensis (found on the Apennine Peninsula)
- Anguis cephalonica (native to the Peloponnese Peninsula)

== Physical traits ==
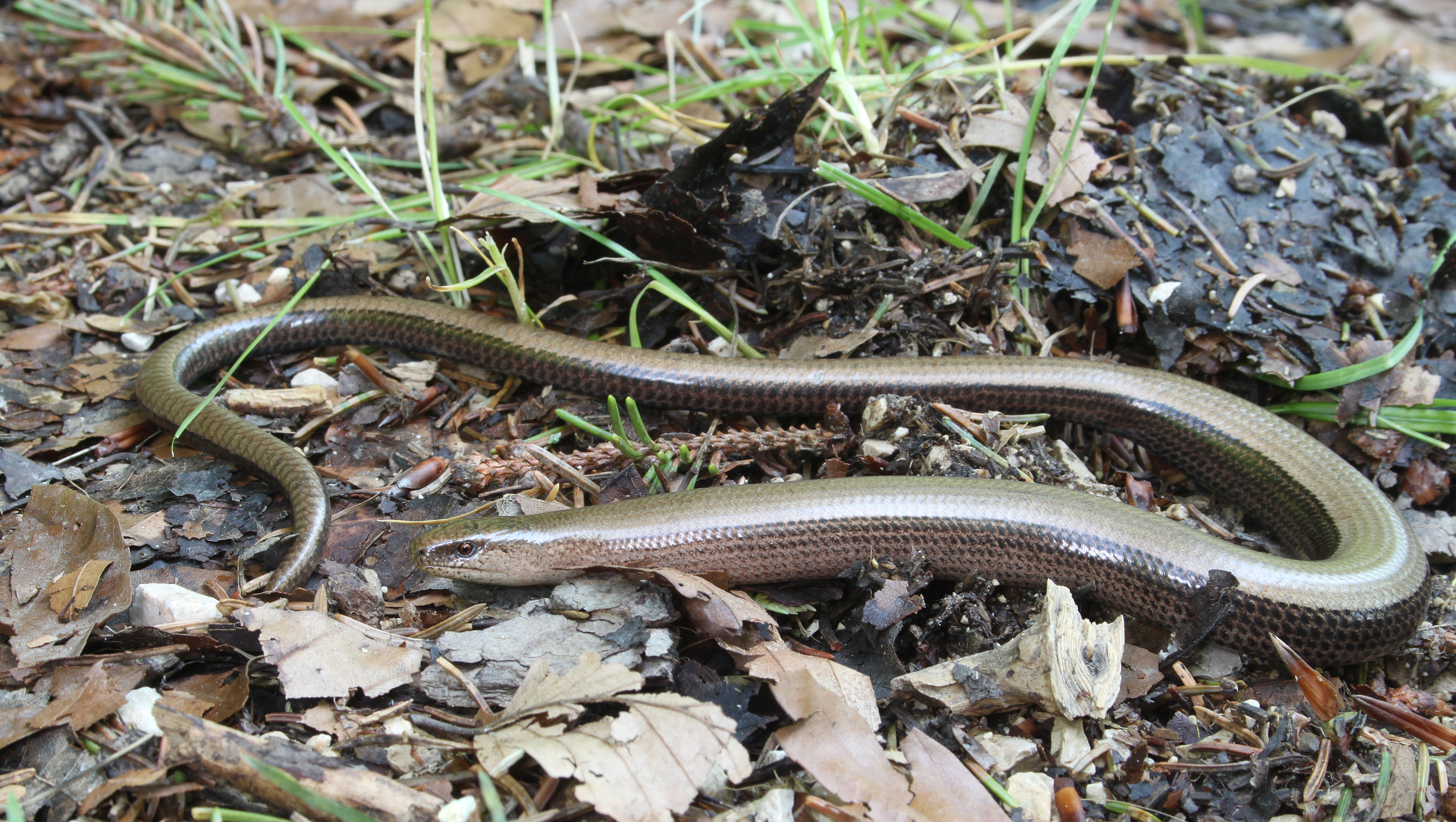
Slow worm in Germany

Twitching tail of a slow worm shortly after being shed

Slow worms have an elongated body with a circular cross-section without limbs and reach a maximum length of up to 57.5cm. Most adult animals are between 40 and 45cm long, with up to 22cm on the head and trunk section and the rest on the tail. There is no visible neck. The tail, which ends in a horny tip, is continuous with the trunk and is often slightly longer. Slow worms exhibit caudal autotomy, the severing of the tail when it is pulled by predators. When regrown, the tail grows back only to a short stub, probably because loss of the tail does not sufficiently affect the species' locomotion, foraging, and defense abilities to necessitate full and rapid regeneration.

The skin surface consists of smooth, round to hexagonal scales that do not overlap and are of approximately the same shape on the dorsal and ventral sides of the body. There are several longitudinal rows running along the underside. In total, the trunk has 125 to 150 transverse scale rows and the tail has another 130 to 160 rows. Beneath the scales are bony plates (osteoderms), causing slow worms to crawl much more stiffly and clumsily than snakes. The scales on the head are similar to those of snakes. The ear openings are usually completely hidden under the scales. The relatively small eyes have movable, closable eyelids (these are fused in snakes) and round pupils. The rather short tongue is broad, bilobed, and does not end in fine points. To lick, i.e. to absorb odorous substances, slow worms have to open their mouths slightly, as they lack the gap in the upper lip that snakes possess. The pointed, sometimes loosely fixed teeth are curved backwards; there are 7 to 9 teeth in the premaxilla, 10 to 12 in the maxilla, and 14 to 16 in the lower jaw.

The female often has a stripe along the spine and dark sides, while the male may have blue spots dorsally. Juveniles of both sexes are gold with dark brown bellies and sides with a dark stripe along the spine.

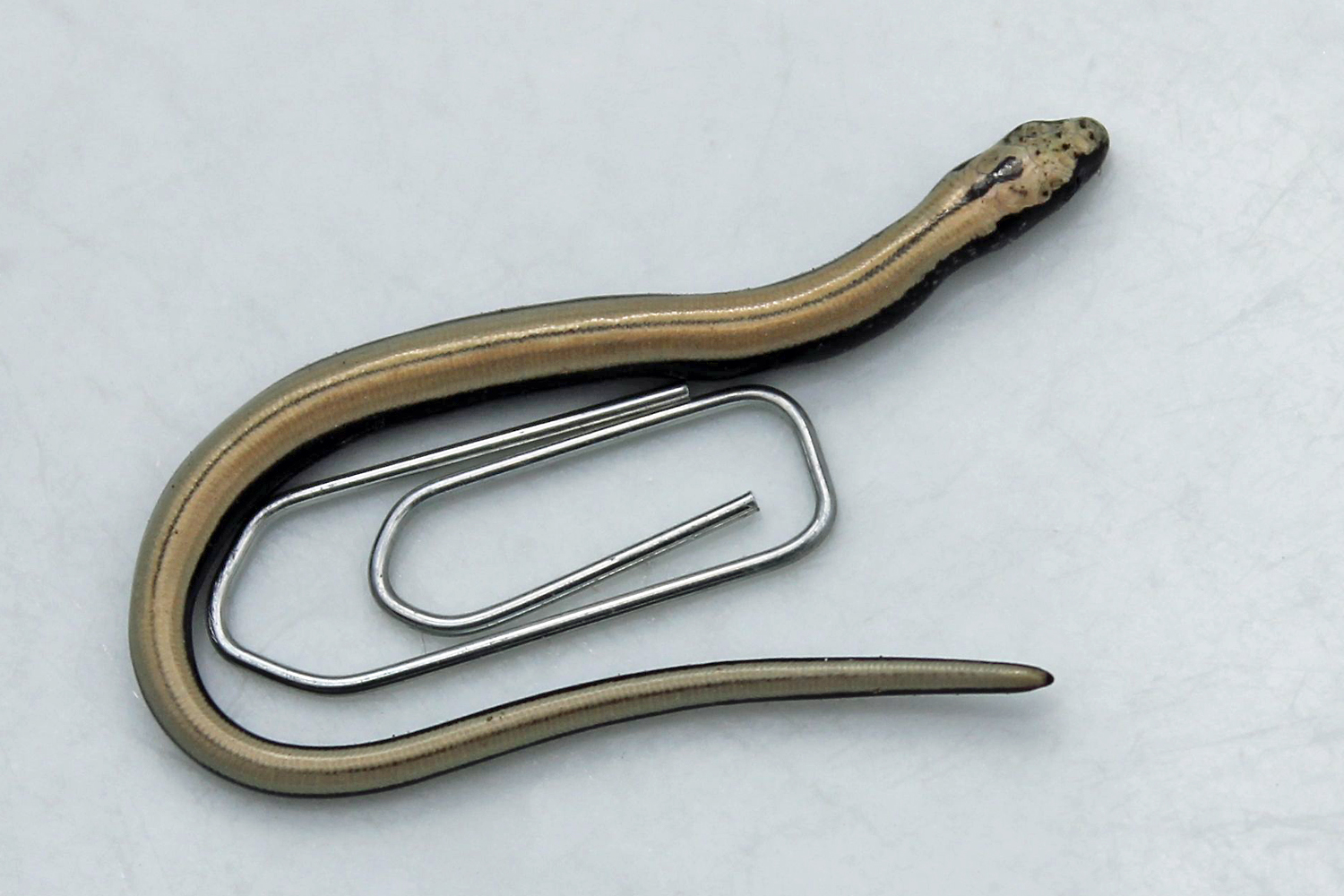
A juvenile slow worm (with a paperclip for scale)

=== Size and longevity ===
Adult slow worms grow to a length of approximately 50cm (20"), and are known for their exceptionally long lives; the slow worm may be the longest-living lizard, living about 30 years in the wild and up to at least 54 years in captivity (this record is held by a male slow worm that lived at the Copenhagen Zoo from 1892 until 1946, the age when first obtained is unknown).

== Reproduction ==
In Central Europe, the mating season of the species is usually between late April and June. The males often fight violently for the females, although in most populations they are in the majority. The opponents try to push each other to the ground, bite each other, and wrap themselves tightly around each other. During mating, the female is often bitten on the head or the neck, while the male inserts his two hemipenes into the female's cloaca. Copulation may take several hours.

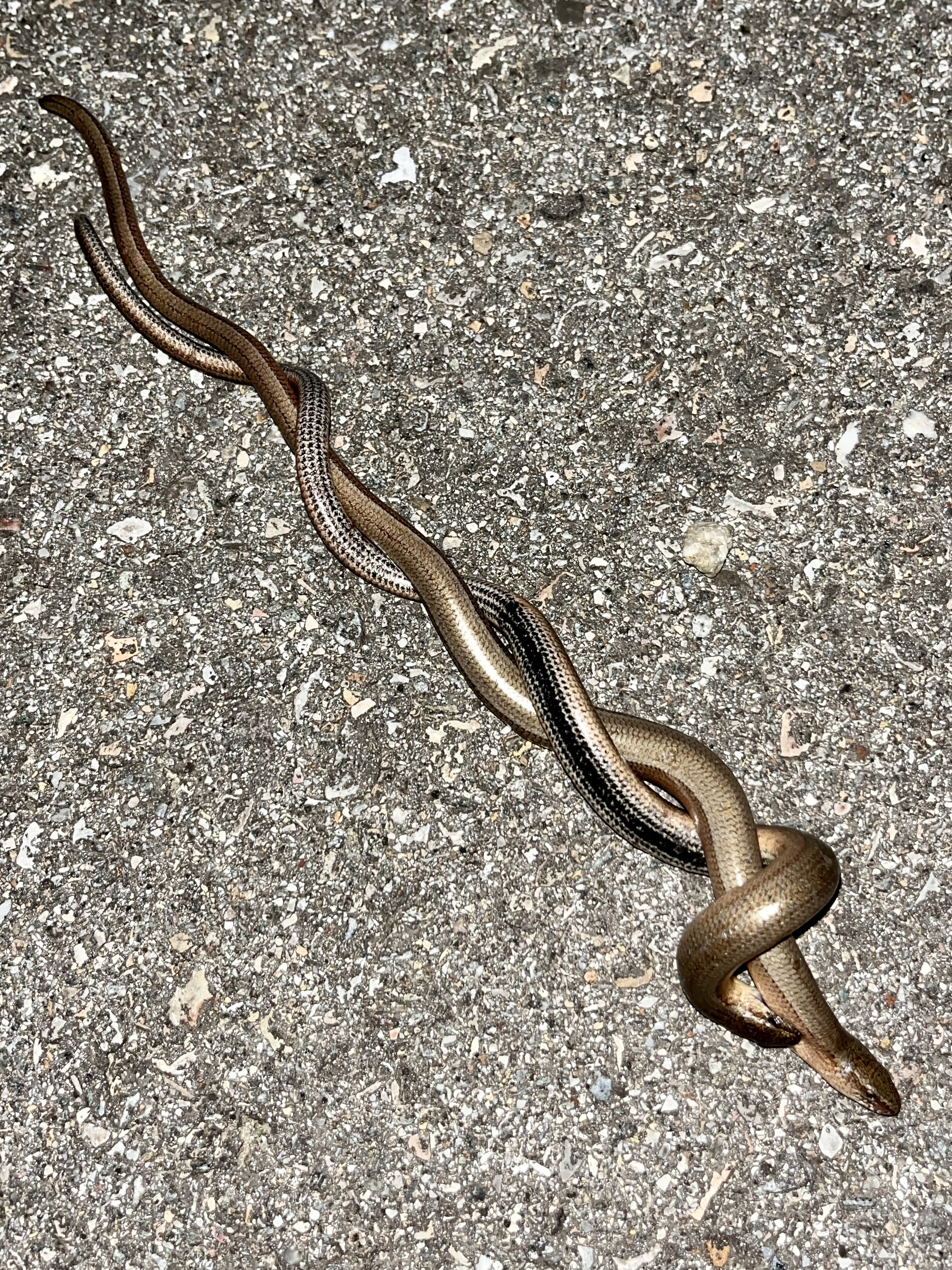
Evening mating of slow worms (Anguis fragilis)

Females sometimes mate later with other males. The gestation period of the females is 11 to 14 weeks, after which they usually give birth to eight to twelve young (extreme values: 2 to 28) between mid-July and the end of August, sometimes even later. Slow worms are ovoviviparous; at birth, the 7 to 10cm long young animals are in a very thin, transparent egg shell, which they pierce immediately afterwards. They initially weigh less than a gram and still have a remnant of the yolk.

== Ecology ==
These reptiles do not bask in the sun like other species, instead choosing to warm themselves indirectly under objects such as rocks that have been warmed by the sun. They are often found in long grass and other moist environments. In the UK, slow worms are commonly encountered in gardens and allotments, where they can be encouraged to enter and assist in the removal of pest insects by placing black plastic or providing places to shelter such as piles of logs, corrugated iron sheets, or tiles. On warm days, one or more slow worms can often be found underneath these heat collectors.

The activity pattern of a slow worm is often irregular and largely determined by the environment. For example, research shows they tend to be awake during the first sunlight hours, the twilight hours, and after rainfall. A reason for this could be that this relates to the activity of their prey.

Predators include adders, badgers, birds of prey, crows, domestic cats, foxes, hedgehogs, pheasants, and smooth snakes. Slow worms detect the presence of predators with their tongues by flicking them in and out to 'smell'. Like many other lizards, they can autotomize, meaning that they have the ability to shed their tails to escape predators. While the tail regrows, it does not reach its original length.

The diet of a slow worm consists mainly of invertebrates, such as slugs, snails, and earthworms.

== Protected status in the UK ==
In the United Kingdom, the slow worm has been granted protected status, alongside all other native British reptile species. The slow worm population has been declining, and under the Wildlife and Countryside Act 1981, to intentionally kill, injure, sell, or advertise to sell them is illegal.

== Biogeography ==
The slow worm is assumed to be non-native in Ireland, possibly arriving in the 1900s. Due to their secretive habits they are difficult to observe and are sighted only in parts of County Clare and possibly County Galway, mainly in the Burren region.

== Evolutionary history ==
Members of the genus Anguis, to which the slow worm belongs, first appeared in Europe during the Mammal Paleogene zone 14, between 43.5 and 41.2 million years ago, corresponding to the Lutetian stage of the Eocene. Remains assigned to the Anguis fragilis species complex are known from the late Miocene onwards.

== Gallery ==
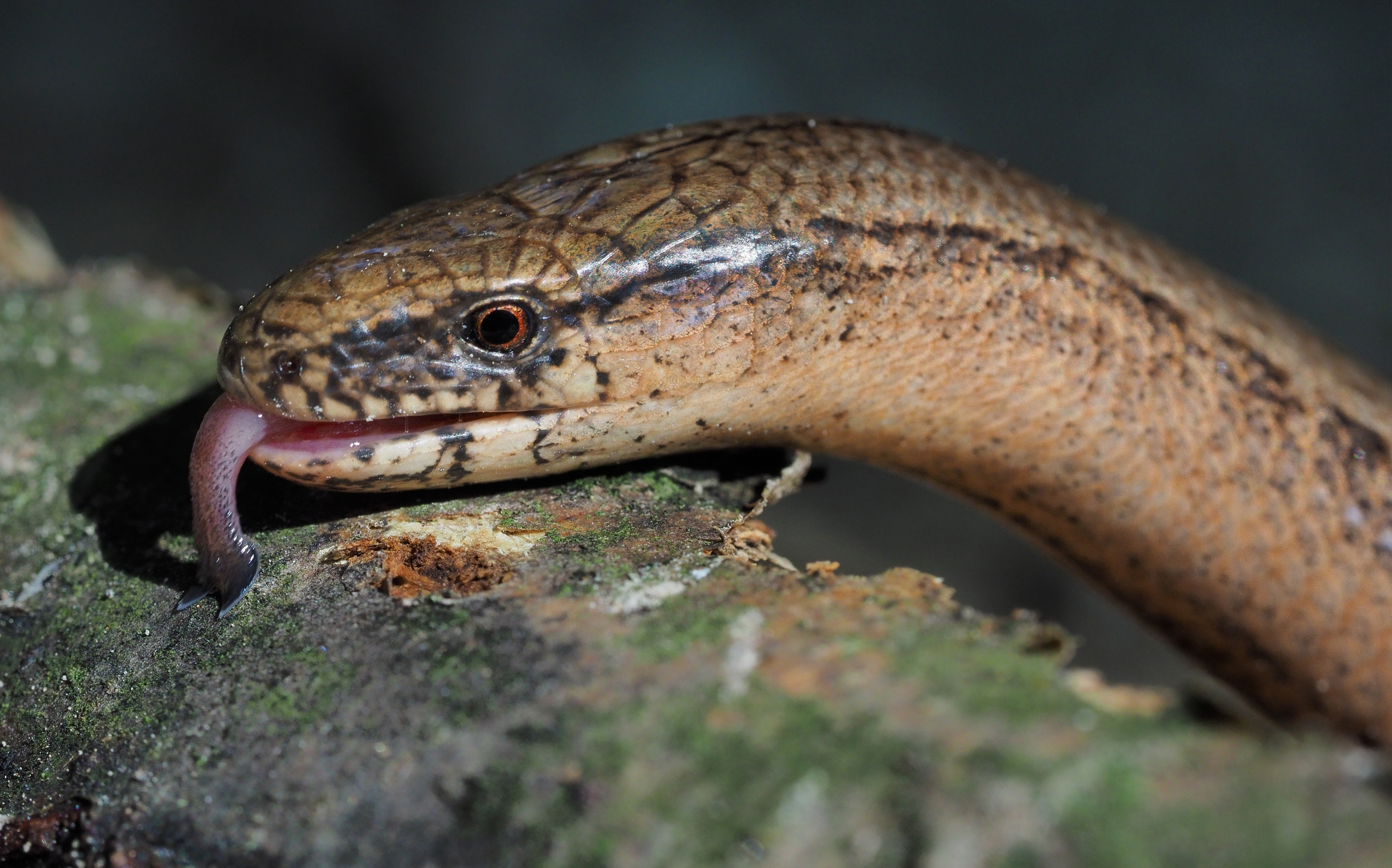
A slow worm

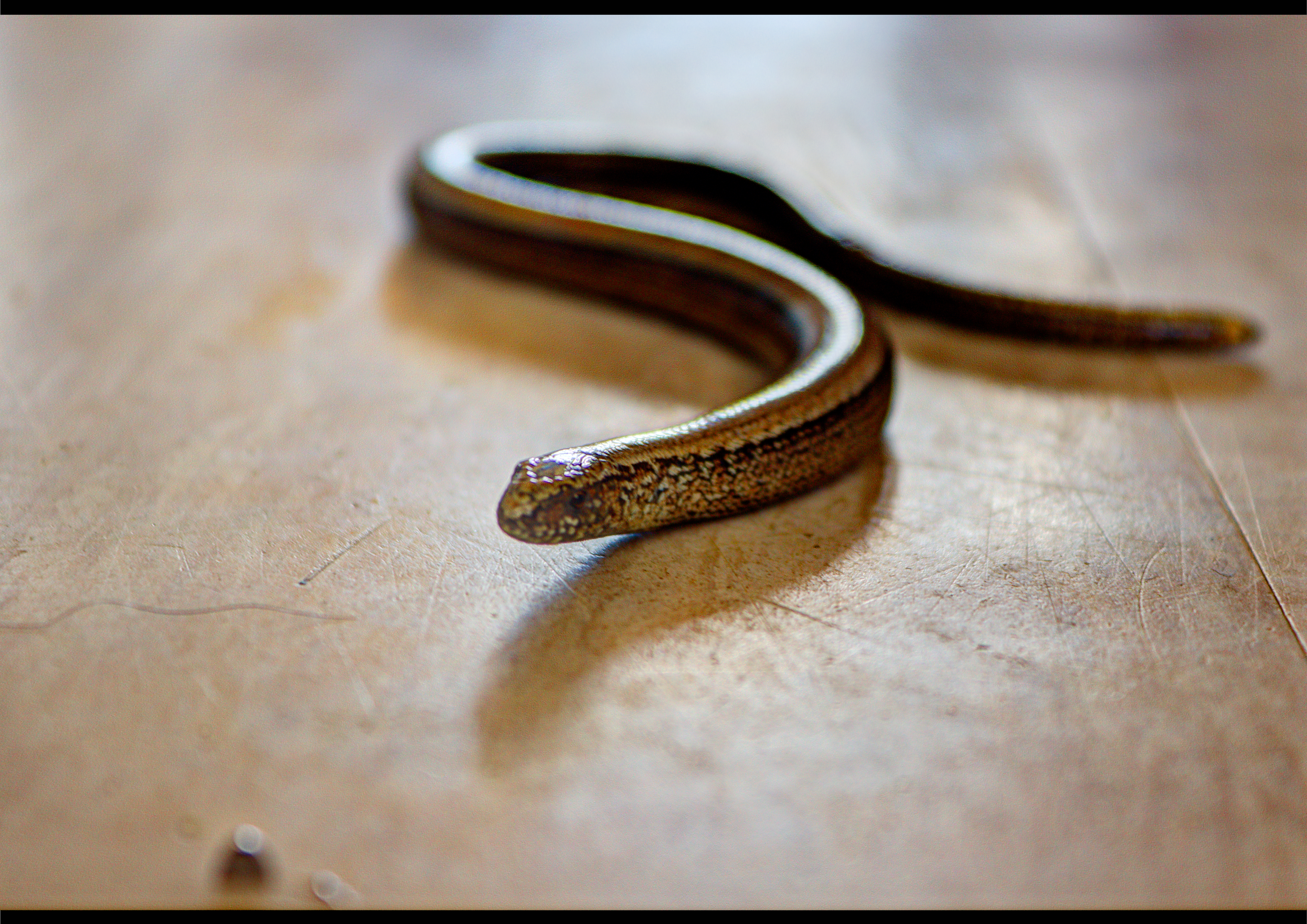
A slow worm close up

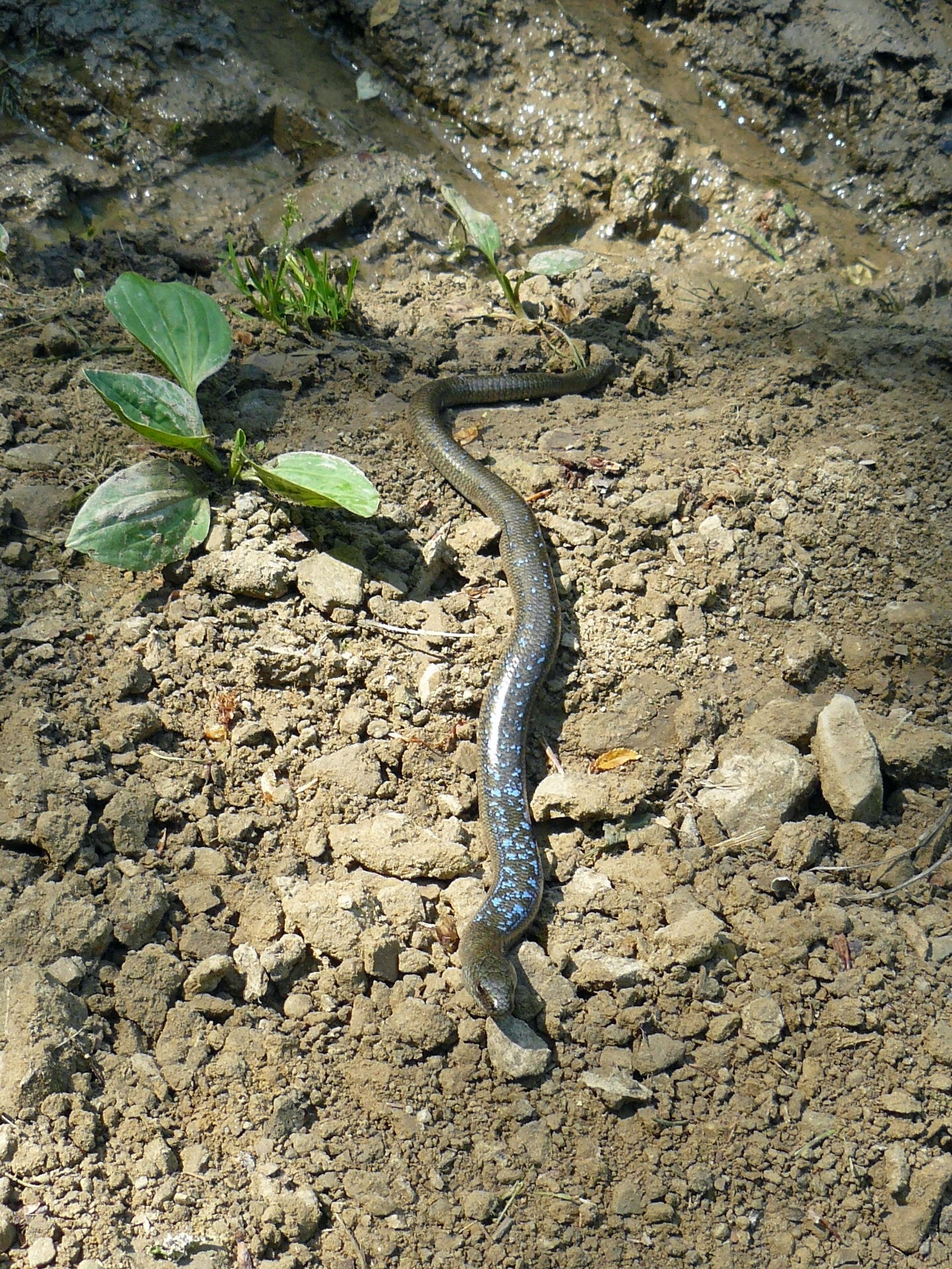
Slow worm in turquoise color

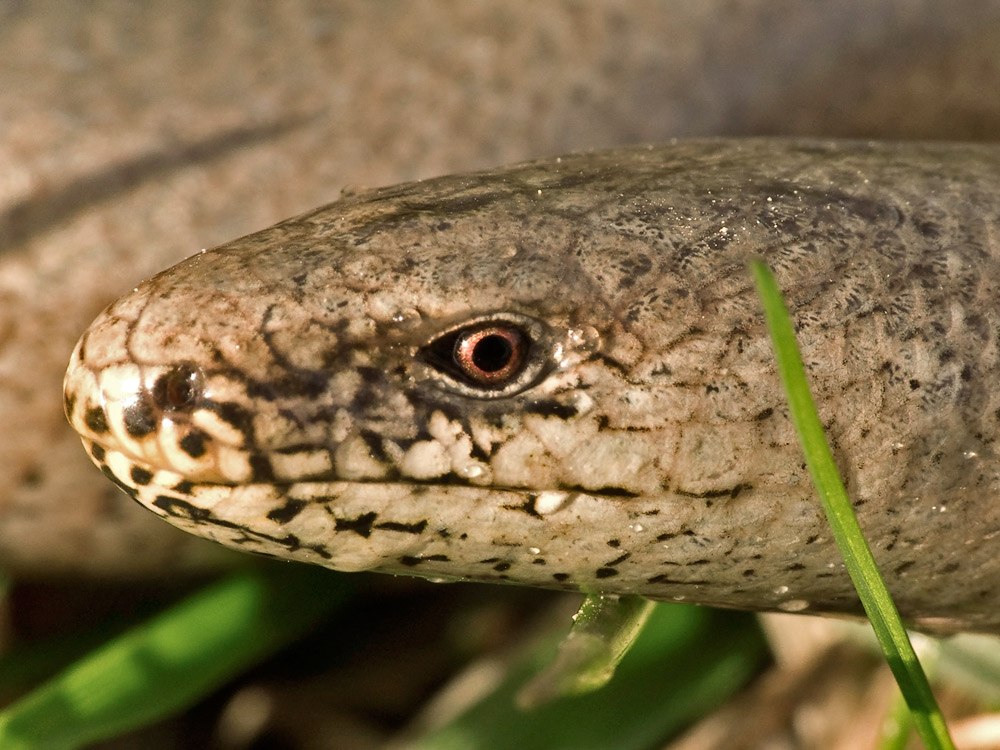
A little slow worm's face

A slow worm moving through grass. This individual is a juvenile, as evidenced by its golden coloration.

A slow worm seeks protection.

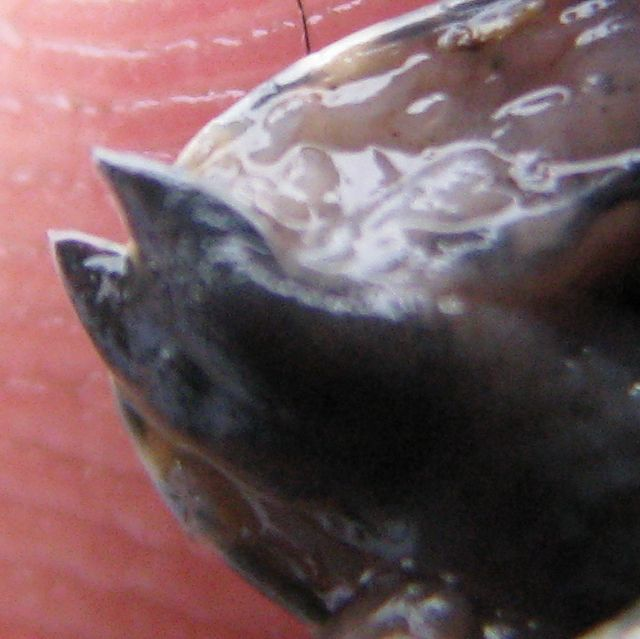
The tongue of the slow worm is short with two tips

In a woodland in Wales

== See also ==
- Glass snake
- Pygopodidae
- Limbless vertebrate
