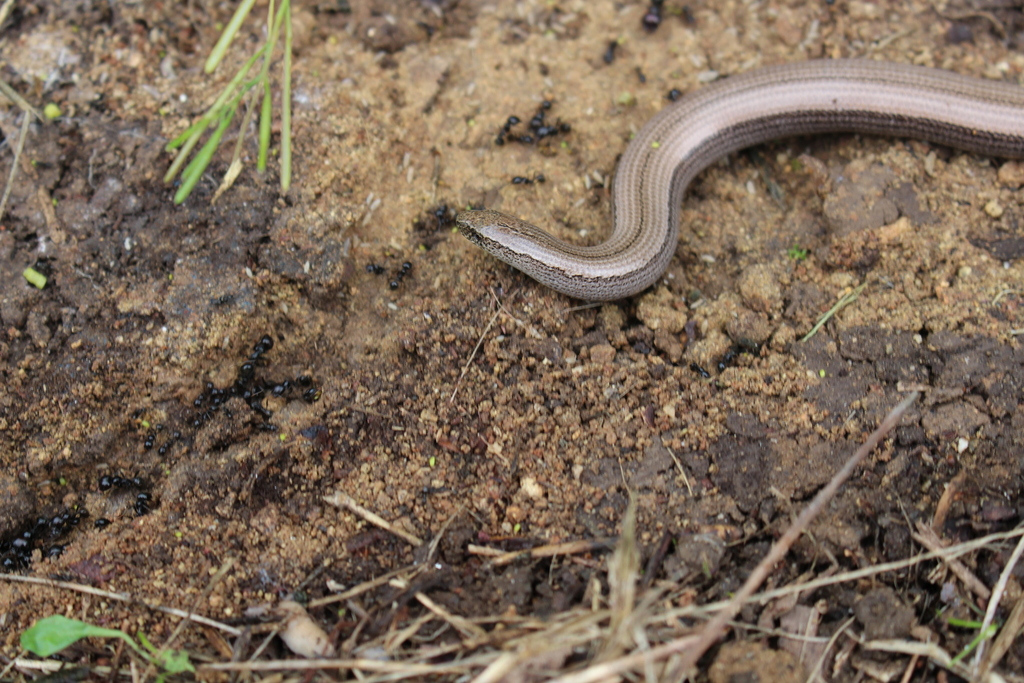

Scientific classification
- Kingdom: Animalia
- Phylum: Chordata
- Class: Reptilia
- Order: Squamata
- Suborder: Anguimorpha
- Family: Anguidae
- Genus: Anguis
- Species: A. veronensis

Binomial name
- Anguis veronensis Pollini, 1818
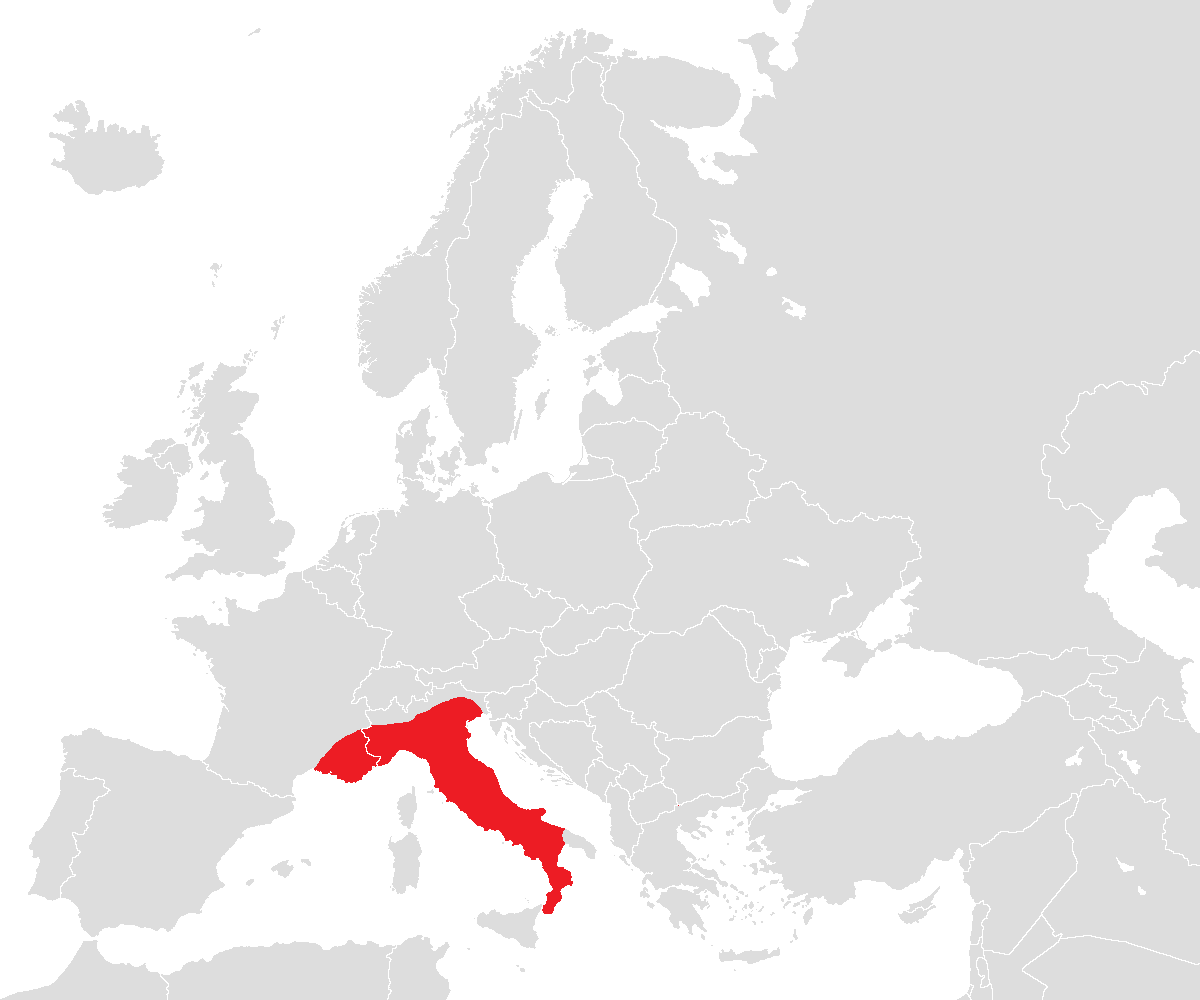
- Range of A. veronensis

Synonyms
- Anguis bicolor Risso, 1826; Anguis cinereus Risso, 1826; Anguis cinerea Gvoždik et al, 2012

= Anguis veronensis =

Species of reptile

Anguis veronensis, commonly known as the Italian slow worm, is a European lizard species in the family Anguidae. The slow worm is distributed throughout Italy and in southeastern part of France.

A. veronensis got its first scientific description in 1818, when it was described by Italian naturalist Ciro Polinni, and named after the Italian city Verona, where specimens were found. The synonymous species name Anguis cinerea (cinereus) is derived from the Latin word cinereus meaning ash-grey, even though typical gray colour is a common feature of the whole genus Anguis, especially the similar common slow worm, Anguis fragilis.

== Taxonomy and description ==
In the past, slow worms from the Italian Peninsula were not distinguished from other European slow worms; they were usually perceived as conspecifics of Anguis fragilis. A relatively long independent evolutionary history and distinct identity of both morphological and genetic features led to the species resurrection in 2013 under the synonymous scientific name Anguis cinerea. Following the rules of International Code of Zoological Nomenclature about priority naming the slow worm was renamed to the oldest available name for the same taxon, Anguis veronensis.

Distinguishing the Italian slow worm from other genetically deeply divergent species of genus Anguis can be done by performing genetic analysis, since species are closely morphologically similar and thus poorly separable. Analyses of the morphological comparison showed that A. veronensis differs from A. fragilis in relative tail length (A. veronensis has longer tail in both sexes), subcaudal scales (A. veronensis has more subcaudal scales in both sexes) and head morphology (A. veronensis has relatively more robust head). Differences in log-linear analysis of both lizard's colouration were negligible, the same goes for insufficient variation in the external ear opening presence.

== Distribution and ecology ==
For now, this anguid species has been observed only in Italy and some parts of France. Some experts hypothesize the slow worm's remotest area of distribution also includes southern parts of Switzerland. The species' main territories are located on the Italian Peninsula, with animals populating the whole peninsula but its southeastern parts. The Italian slow worm is more common in northern Italy, while populations in southern parts of the country are smaller.

In north and northeastern Italy, as well as in Slovenia (only hybrids found), the Italian slow worm sometimes comes in contact with the common slow worm, resulting in occasional hybridization. Anguis veronensis inhabits exclusively the far southeastern mainland France, region Provence-Alpes-Côte d'Azur. The species' presence has also been confirmed on the Mediterranean island Ile Sainte-Marguerite, with animals being genetically related to mainland slow worms of Provence-Alpes-Côte d'Azur.

The northern populations' common habitats include various forest-steppe, steppe and ruderal areas, with some animals inhabiting urban surfaces. Slow worms of central and southern regions of Italy usually inhabit less diverse collection of habitats; borders of oak and beech forests are the most common, followed by sand dunes of Mediterranean characteristic maquis shrubland. Animals are known to live in altitudes ranging from sea level to more than 2.000 above in the Alps.

Majority of individuals can be described as primarily diurnal (active at daytime) and occasionally crepuscular (active at twilight), while Mediterranean slow worms are mostly crepuscular and sometimes nocturnal (active at nighttime).
