= Kathleen Lamborn =

American biostatistician

Kathleen Rundle Lamborn is an American biostatistician, known for her highly-cited publications on glioma. She is an Adjunct Professor Emeritus of Neurological Surgery and former Director of the Cancer Center Biostatistics Core at the University of California, San Francisco, and Senior Scientific Consultant at Quintiles Pacific.

With Leonard J. Tashman, she is the author of an introductory textbook on statistics, The Ways and Means of Statistics (Harcourt College Publishers, 1979).

Lamborn did her undergraduate studies at Oberlin College, and graduated in 1966 with a bachelor's degree in mathematics. She went to Stanford University for graduate school in statistics, earning a master's degree in 1968 and a Ph.D. in 1970. Her dissertation, supervised by Rupert G. Miller Jr., was Problems from Biostatistics. She joined the faculty of the University of Vermont in 1970, and directed the biometry facility and biostatistics master's program there from 1972 to 1974. From 1974 to 1988 she worked in industry, at Upjohn, and from 1988 to 1993 she worked for the Northern California Cancer Center. She joined the University of California, San Francisco in 1996, as Director of the Cancer Center Biostatistics Core, and retired in 2002.

In 1984, she was elected as a Fellow of the American Statistical Association.
