= Annual Review of Statistics and Its Application =

- Discipline: Statistics
- Language: English
- Edited by: Nancy Reid

Publication details
- History: 2014–present, 12 years old
- Publisher: Annual Reviews (US)
- Frequency: Annually
- Open access: Subscribe to Open
- Impact factor: 9.8 (2025)

Standard abbreviations
- ISO 4: Annu. Rev. Stat. Appl.

Indexing
- ISSN: 2326-8298 (print); 2326-831X (web)

Links
- Journal homepage

The Annual Review of Statistics and Its Application is a peer-reviewed scientific journal published by Annual Reviews (AR). It releases an annual volume of review articles relevant to the field of statistics. It has been in publication since 2014. The editor is Nancy Reid. As of 2023, Annual Review of Statistics and Its Application is being published as open access, under the Subscribe to Open model. As of 2026, Journal Citation Reports gives the journal a 2025 impact factor of 9.8, ranking it second of 170 journal titles in the category "Statistics and Probability" and second of 137 titles in "Mathematics, Interdisciplinary Applications".

== History ==
The Annual Review of Statistics and Its Application was first published in 2014 by Annual Reviews (AR), a nonprofit organization whose stated mission is to synthesize knowledge "for the progress of science and the benefit of society." Its founding editor was Stephen E. Fienberg. Following Fienberg's death in 2016, associate editor Nancy Reid completed the 2017 volume, of which Feinberg is credited as editor. Reid is credited as editor beginning in 2018. Though the journal was initially published in print, as of 2021 it is only published electronically. Some of its articles are available online prior to the volume publication date.

== Scope and indexing ==
The Annual Review of Statistics and Its Application publishes review articles about methodological advances in statistics and the use of computational tools that make the advances possible. It is abstracted and indexed in Scopus, Science Citation Index Expanded, and Inspec.
