= Yvonne Bishop =

American statistician

- Died: May 26, 2015
- Title: Director of the Office of Statistical Standards, Energy Information Administration

Academic background
- Education: Harvard University
- Thesis: Multi-Dimensional Contingency Tables: Cell Estimates (1967)

Academic work
- Discipline: Statistics
- Sub-discipline: Biostatistics
- Institutions: Harvard School of Public Health, United States Department of Energy, Energy Information Administration
- Notable works: Discrete Multivariate Analysis: Theory and Practice

Yvonne Millicent Mahala Bishop (died May 26, 2015) was an English-born statistician who spent her working life in America. She wrote a "classic" book on multivariate statistics, and made important studies of the health effects of anesthetics and air pollution. Later in her career, she became the Director of the Office of Statistical Standards in the Energy Information Administration.

== Education ==
Bishop completed her Ph.D. at Harvard University in 1967; her dissertation was Multi-Dimensional Contingency Tables: Cell Estimates. As a student, she also made significant contributions to a national study of the side-effects of halothane anesthetics, and temporarily moved to Stanford University to take part in the study.

Writing of her during this period, Frederick Mosteller says that she already had significant experience in biology. She had worked in the fishing and fishery industry, but moved to health and medicine after experiencing too much discrimination as a woman in the fisheries. Mosteller writes that she had "a remarkable ability to get things done", and that she wrote several chapters of the halothane report.

== Career ==
After completing her doctorate, Bishop worked for the Children's Cancer Research Foundation, and as a faculty member in the biostatistics department of the Harvard School of Public Health. At Harvard, she became one of the lead researchers of the Harvard Six Cities study, an influential work on the effects of air pollution on public health. In 1975, she was elected as a Fellow of the American Statistical Association.

By 1982 Bishop had moved to Washington, D.C., where she was listed as deputy assistant director for energy data operations at the United States Department of Energy. In 1996 she was listed as Director of the Office of Statistical Standards in the Energy Information Administration.

== Book ==
With Stephen Fienberg and Paul W. Holland, Bishop became the author of a book on multivariate statistics, Discrete Multivariate Analysis: Theory and Practice (MIT Press, 1975; Springer, 2007). By 1980 the book had already become regarded as a "classic" in the field.
