= Elena Erosheva =

Russian statistician and social scientist

Elena Aleksandrovna Erosheva
- Born: Russia
- Education: Novosibirsk State University; Utah State University; Carnegie Mellon University (PhD)
- Known for: Mixed Membership Models
- Scientific career
- Fields: Statistics
- Workplaces: University of Washington
- Thesis: Grade of Membership and Latent Structure Models with Application to Disability Survey Data (2002)
- Doctoral advisor: Stephen Fienberg

Elena Aleksandrovna Erosheva is a Russian-American statistician and social scientist whose research applies Bayesian hierarchical modeling and latent variable models to problems in the social, behavioral, and health sciences. She is a professor at the University of Washington, appointed jointly in the Department of Statistics and the School of Social Work, and the director of the university's Center for Statistics and the Social Sciences.

== Education and career ==
Erosheva graduated from Novosibirsk State University in 1995, with an honors diploma in mathematics and applied mathematics. After earning a master's degree in statistics at Utah State University in 1998, she completed her Ph.D. in statistics at Carnegie Mellon University in 2002. Her dissertation, Grade of Membership and Latent Structure Models with Application to Disability Survey Data, was supervised by Stephen Fienberg.

She became a research assistant professor at the University of Washington in 2002, where she has been full professor since 2017. For 2018–2019 she held the International Chair in Data Science at Côte d'Azur University in France.

She is a moderator for the statistics section of the arXiv preprint repository, a member of the National Academies Committee on Diversity and Inclusion in the Leadership of Competed Space Missions, and 2021 program chair for the Social Statistics Section of the American Statistical Association.

== Contributions ==
Erosheva and her coauthors won the 2013 Mitchell Prize of the Section on Bayesian Statistical Science of the American Statistical Association and the International Society for Bayesian Analysis for their work on correlations between age and criminal behavior. Other topics in her research have included racial bias in peer review of National Institutes of Health grants, and negative correlations between teen pregnancy, delinquency, and drug use.

She is an editor of the Handbook of Mixed Membership Models and Their Applications (Chapman & Hall/CRC, 2015).

== Recognition ==
Erosheva was named a Fellow of the American Statistical Association in 2021.
