= Edoardo Airoldi =

Italian-American statistician

- Born: Edoardo Maria Airoldi; July 22, 1974 (age 52)
- Education: Bocconi University B.S. (1999); Carnegie Mellon University Ph.D. (2007)
- Known for: Mixed-membership stochastic block model (MMSBM)
- Scientific career
- Fields: Statistics; Computer Science; Machine Learning; Artificial Intelligence
- Workplaces: Princeton University; Harvard University; Temple University
- Doctoral advisor: Stephen E. Fienberg
- Website: www.fas.harvard.edu/~airoldi/

Edoardo Maria Airoldi is the Millard E. Gladfelter Professor of Statistics and Data Science in the Fox School of Business at Temple University. Prior to fall 2018 he was an associate professor in the Department of Statistics at Harvard University, where he founded and directed the Harvard Laboratory for Applied Statistics & Data Science, until spring 2017. Additionally, he held visiting positions at MIT and Yale University. His work is primarily in statistics and machine learning.

== Recognition ==
Airoldi was elected as a Fellow of the Institute of Mathematical Statistics in 2019, and as a Fellow of the American Statistical Association in 2020.
