= Aleksandra Slavković =

American statistician

Aleksandra B. Slavković

Academic background
- Education: Duquesne University
- Alma mater: Carnegie Mellon University
- Thesis: Statistical Disclosure Limitation beyond the Margins: Characterization of Joint Distributions for Contingency Tables (2004)
- Doctoral advisor: Stephen Fienberg

Academic work
- Discipline: Statistician
- Institutions: Pennsylvania State University
- Main interests: Statistical disclosure control Algebraic statistics Statistics in the social sciences

Aleksandra B. (Seša) Slavković is an American statistician, a professor of statistics at Pennsylvania State University, and Associate Dean for Graduate Education in the Eberly College of Science at Pennsylvania State. She also chairs the Committee on Privacy and Confidentiality in Statistics of the American Statistical Association. Her research interests include statistical disclosure control, algebraic statistics, and the applications of statistics in the social sciences.

== Education and career ==
Slavković majored in psychology at Duquesne University, with a minor in biology, graduating in 1996. She went to Carnegie Mellon University for her graduate studies, where she earned a master's degree in human–computer interaction in 1999, a second master's degree in statistics in 2001, and a Ph.D. in statistics in 2004. Her dissertation, Statistical Disclosure Limitation beyond the Margins: Characterization of Joint Distributions for Contingency Tables, was supervised by Stephen Fienberg.

She has been on the Pennsylvania State University faculty since 2004, with visiting positions at the Institute for Mathematics and its Applications, Utrecht University, and Cornell University. She is editor for the scholarly journal Statistics and Public Policy (SPP).

== Recognition ==
Slavković became an elected member of the International Statistical Institute in 2012. She was elected as a Fellow of the American Statistical Association in 2018. In 2021, she was named a Fellow of the Institute of Mathematical Statistics, "for novel contributions to the development of statistical disclosure techniques and algebraic methods, for contributions to graduate research, and for contributions to editorial and other publication activities of the IMS and other statistical organizations."
