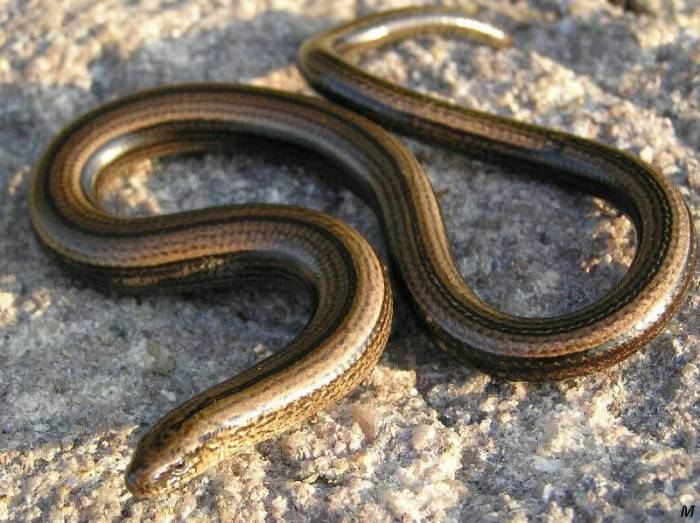
- Anguis fragilis

Scientific classification
- Kingdom: Animalia
- Phylum: Chordata
- Class: Reptilia
- Order: Squamata
- Suborder: Anguimorpha
- Family: Anguidae
- Subfamily: Anguinae
- Genus: Anguis; Linnaeus, 1758

Type species
- Anguis fragilis Linnaeus, 1758

Species
- A. cephallonica; A. colchica; A. fragilis; A. graeca; A. veronensis; †A. rarus; †A. stammeri; †?A. polgardiensis
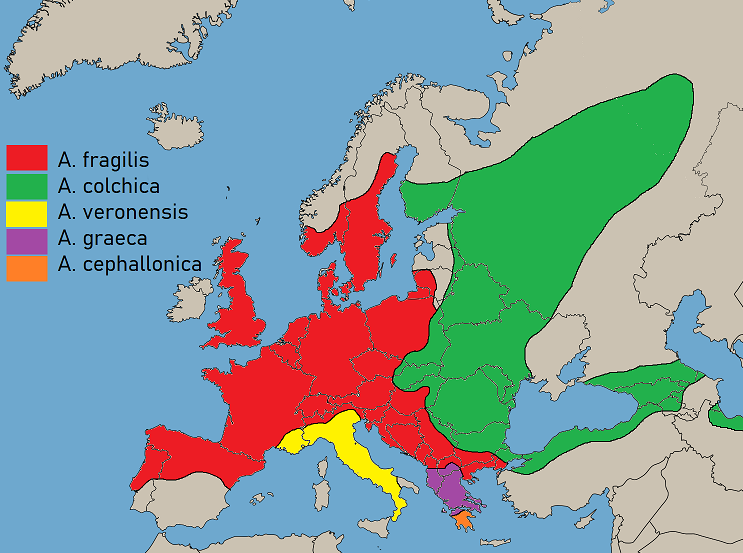

= Anguis =

Anguis Temporal range: Early Eocene–present

Genus of lizards

Slow worms (also called blindworms and hazelworms) are a small genus (Anguis) of snake-like legless lizards in the family Anguidae. The genus contains five extant living species, including the common slow worm (A. fragilis), the eastern slow worm (A. colchica), the Greek slow worm (A. graeca), the Peloponnese slow worm (A. cephalonnica), and the Italian slow worm (A. veronensis). There are also known fossil species.

== Description ==
Slow worms are typically grey-brown, with the females having a coppery sheen and two lateral black stripes, and the males displaying electric blue spots, particularly in the breeding season. They give birth to live young, which are about 4 cm (1.6 in) long at birth and generally have golden stripes.

Slow worms are slow-moving and can be easily caught, which has given rise to the folk etymology that the "slow" in slow worm is the same as the English adjective slow; the actual origin is a proto-Germanic root which simply means "slowworm" (cf. German Schleiche). Like many lizards, slow worms can shed their tails to distract predators. The tail regrows, but never fully. Principal predators are birds, badgers, hedgehogs, foxes, and domestic cats.

The average British slow worm can grow to 45 cm when fully mature and weigh about 100g, females being slightly larger than the males. The tail makes up around half its length, but is indistinguishable from the body. It has been recorded to live for up to 30 years in the wild, and the record age for a slow worm in captivity is 54 years (Copenhagen Zoo).

The specific name fragilis (fragile) comes from the tendency of this species to shed its own tail (caudal autotomy) when threatened by predators or if handled too roughly.

== Morphology ==
Although slow worms much resemble snakes, and are often mistaken for such, they are actually lizards that have lost their limbs completely with evolution.

Slow worms can be distinguished from snakes by several features: their eyelids, which snakes lack (having brille instead); their small ear openings, which again snakes lack; and their tongues, which are notched in the centre rather than completely forked like a snake's. Further, snakes have an opening in their upper jaw to allow their tongue through, which slow worms lack.

== Habitat ==
Slow worms live in any habitat that is warm and protected, such as woodland, grassland, and heathland; they are frequently found in garden compost heaps, sometimes on purpose for pest control. They range across most of Europe and into parts of Asia, but they are restricted to temperate and humid habitats. They hibernate from October to February/March, both communally and solitarily, and sometimes share hibernating sites with other reptiles.

== Diet ==
Slow worms have grooved teeth which allow them to grab and swallow whole their soft invertebrate prey, such as slugs, hairless caterpillars, other insects, spiders, and earthworms. Snails are usually avoided, except when they are still very young and the shell can be broken easily.

== Protected status ==
Slow worms are protected in the United Kingdom, Poland, Croatia, and Slovakia.

== Classification ==
Subfamily Anguinae

- Genus Anguis
  - Anguis cephallonica, Peloponnese slow worm – Werner, 1894
  - Anguis colchica, eastern slow worm – (Nordmann, 1840)
  - Anguis fragilis, common slow worm — Linnaeus, 1758
  - Anguis graeca, Greek slow worm – Bedriaga, 1881
  - Anguis veronensis, Italian slow worm — Pollini, 1818
  - †Anguis rarus Klembara & Rummel, 2017
  - †Anguis stammeri Brunner, 1957
  - †Anguis polgardiensis Bolkay, 1913

Gvoždík et al. (2013) distinguished five genetic species of Anguis: graeca, colchica, fragilis, cinerea, and cephallonica, but a review of the genus has not yet been completed.

=== Extant species ===
Image	Scientific name	Common name	Distribution	Range map
	Anguis cephallonica	Peloponnese slow worm	southern Greece	
	Anguis colchica	eastern slow worm	eastern Europe, the Caucasus, and northern Anatolia and Iran	
	Anguis fragilis	common slow worm	western, central, and parts of southeastern Europe	
	Anguis graeca	Greek slow worm	Greece, Albania, and Macedonia	
	Anguis veronensis	Italian slow worm	Italy and southeastern France	
