= Rupert G. Miller =

American statistician (1933–1986)

Rupert Griel Miller, Jr.
- Born: January 31, 1933; Lancaster, Pennsylvania
- Died: March 15, 1986 (aged 53); Stanford, California
- Known for: multiple comparisons jackknife resampling

Academic background
- Education: Princeton University; Stanford University
- Doctoral advisor: Samuel Karlin

Academic work
- Discipline: Statistics
- Institutions: University of California, Berkeley; Stanford University
- Doctoral students: Donald Bentley; Bradley Efron; Nancy Reid; Gabrielle Kelly; Kathleen Lamborn

Rupert Griel Miller, Jr. (January 31, 1933 – March 15, 1986) was an American statistician known for his work on multiple comparison and jackknife resampling.

== Education and career ==
Miller was born in Lancaster, Pennsylvania and attended the Hill School. He entered Princeton University in 1950, where he was a member of Phi Beta Kappa and the university's rowing team. He graduated from Princeton with a BSc in mathematics in 1954 and moved to Stanford University to continue his study. He received his PhD in statistics at Stanford under Samuel Karlin in 1958. Subsequently, he taught at University of California, Berkeley briefly before joining the statistics faculty at Stanford University in 1959 as an assistant professor. Miller was promoted to associate professor in 1962 and full professor in 1967. Between 1967 and 1972, he served as an associate editor for the Journal of the American Statistical Association, and from 1977 to 1979, he held the editor position for the Annals of Statistics. His students include Bradley Efron and Nancy Reid, Gabrielle Kelly, among others. His entire collection of papers and communications are archived by Stanford University.

Miller became a Fellow of the Institute of Mathematical Statistics in 1968, and the following year, he became a Fellow of the American Statistical Association. He was the editor-in-chief of the journal Annals of Statistics between 1977 and 1979.

Miller's wife was Barbara J. Bonesteele Miller, an education analyst and a Stanford University alumna. In 1983, Miller was diagnosed with a rare form of lymphoma and died three years later in 1986 at Stanford, California.

== Bibliography ==
- Miller, Rupert G. (1980). Biostatistics casebook. New York: Wiley. ISBN 0-471-06258-8. OCLC 5799013.
- Miller, Rupert G. (1981). Survival analysis. New York: Wiley. ISBN 0-471-09434-X. OCLC 7307242.
- Miller, Rupert G. (1981). Simultaneous Statistical Inference (2nd ed.). New York, NY: Springer New York. ISBN 978-1-4613-8122-8. OCLC 852792635.
- Miller, Rupert G. (1997). Beyond ANOVA : basics of applied statistics (1st ed.). London: Chapman & Hall. ISBN 0-412-07011-1. OCLC 36962378.
