= Gabrielle Kelly =

Irish statistician

Gabrielle Elizabeth Kelly is an Irish statistician. She is currently a professor of statistics at University College Dublin, and the former president of the Irish Statistical Association.

Her research has included studies of the correlation between birth and death dates, and on correlations between student attendance at university lectures and the time of day of the lecture.

== Education and career ==
Kelly earned her bachelor's and master's degrees at University College Cork, and completed a Ph.D. in statistics at Stanford University in 1981. Her dissertation, The Influence Function in the Errors in Variables Problem, was supervised by Rupert G. Miller, Jr.

She became a lecturer at University College Cork after completing her doctorate, moved to the department of biostatistics at Columbia University in 1985, moved again to the University College & Middlesex School of Medicine in 1987, and took her present position as professor at University College Dublin in 1990.

== Recognition and service ==
Kelly was the president of the Irish Statistical Association from 2016 to 2018.
