= Irish Statistical Association =

Learned society

The Irish Statistical Association is a learned society which describes itself as "Ireland's primary professional association devoted to the interests of statistics and statisticians".

It was established in 1997, as an outgrowth on the annual Conference on Applied Statistics in Ireland (itself established in 1981), in order to better educate the public about statistics and its applications in society. As well as sponsoring the conference, it organises presentations, exhibits, and prizes regarding statistics at the annual Irish Young Scientist's Exhibition. It operates as an all-Ireland body. In 2001 it began selecting honorary members, naming Garret FitzGerald as its first such member.

Together with the Statistical and Social Inquiry Society of Ireland, the Irish Statistical Association is one of two Irish statistical organisations recognised by the International Statistical Institute.

The president of the association for 2019–2020 is Kathleen O'Sullivan. Past presidents have included Phil Boland (1997–1998), Sally McClean (1998–2000), Dennis Connife (2000–2002), John Haslett (2002–2004), Gilbert MacKenzie (2004–2006), John Hinde (2006–2008), John Connolly (2008–2010), Adele Marshall (2010–2012), John Newell (2012–2014), Brendan Murphy (2014–2016), and Gabrielle Kelly (2016–2019).
