= Ana-Maria Staicu =

Romanian-American biostatistician

Ana-Maria Staicu is a Romanian and American biostatistician whose research topics have included functional regression, longitudinal data, spatial statistics, and the applications of statistics in brain imaging. She is a professor in the Department of Statistics at North Carolina State University.

== Education and career ==
Staicu was a mathematics student as an undergraduate at the University of Bucharest in Romania, where she wrote a bachelor's thesis on perfect graphs under the supervision of Dragos Popescu. She graduated in 2000, and went to the University of Toronto in Canada for graduate study in statistics. She received a master's degree there in 2002, and completed her Ph.D. in 2007. Her doctoral dissertation, On Some Aspects of Likelihood Methods with Applications in Biostatistics, was supervised by Nancy Reid.

She became a Brunel Postdoctoral Research Fellow in the Department of Mathematics at the University of Bristol in England from 2007 to 2009; she cites Ciprian Crainiceanu and Raymond J. Carroll as her mentors for this work. In 2009, she joined North Carolina State University as an assistant professor of statistics. She was promoted to associate professor in 2015 and full professor in 2020.

== Recognition ==
North Carolina State University named Staicu as a University Faculty Scholar, in its 2016–2017 class of scholars.

Staicu was a 2021 recipient of the Statistics in Physical Engineering Sciences Award of the American Statistical Association. In 2025, she was named as a Fellow of the American Statistical Association.
