= Sally McClean =

Northern Irish statistician

Sally Ida McClean
- Occupations: Statistician; Computer scientist Operations researcher
- Title: Professor

Academic background
- Education: Ulster University at Coleraine
- Thesis: Stochastic models of manpower planning applied to several British and Irish firms (1976)
- Academic advisor: Andrew Young
- Website: Ulster University

Sally Ida McClean FRSS is a Northern Irish statistician, computer scientist, and operations researcher. She is a professor of mathematics in the school of computing at Ulster University, and a former president of the Irish Statistical Association. Topics in her research include workforce modeling, health administration, interactive architecture, and survey methodology.

== Education ==
McClean was born in Belfast. She earned an MA in mathematics from the University of Oxford in 1970 and an MSc in mathematical statistics and operations research from Cardiff University in 1972. She completed a Ph.D. in 1976 at the Ulster University at Coleraine. Her dissertation, Stochastic models of manpower planning applied to several British and Irish firms, was supervised by Andrew Young.

== Books ==
McClean's books include:

- Statistical techniques for manpower planning (2nd ed., with David J. Bartholomew and Andrew F. Forbes, Wiley, 1991)
- Questionnaire design: A practical introduction (with Noel Wilson, University of Ulster Press, 1994)

== Recognition and service ==
McClean is a Fellow of the Royal Statistical Society, and Fellow of the Operational Research Society. She was the second president of the Irish Statistical Association, serving as president from 1998 to 2000.
