= Log-linear model =

Mathematical model

A log-linear model is a mathematical model that takes the form of a function whose logarithm equals a linear combination of the parameters of the model, which makes it possible to apply (possibly multivariate) linear regression. That is, it has the general form

$$\exp \left(c + \sum_{i} w_i f_i(X) \right)$$,

in which the f_{i}(X) are quantities that are functions of the variable X, in general a vector of values, while c and the w_{i} stand for the model parameters.

The term may specifically be used for:

- A log-linear plot or graph, which is a type of semi-log plot.
- Poisson regression for contingency tables, a type of generalized linear model.

The specific applications of log-linear models are where the output quantity lies in the range 0 to ∞, for values of the independent variables X, or more immediately, the transformed quantities f_{i}(X) in the range −∞ to +∞. This may be contrasted to logistic models, similar to the logistic function, for which the output quantity lies in the range 0 to 1. Thus the contexts where these models are useful or realistic often depends on the range of the values being modelled.

== See also ==
- Log-linear analysis
- General linear model
- Generalized linear model
- Boltzmann distribution
- Elasticity
