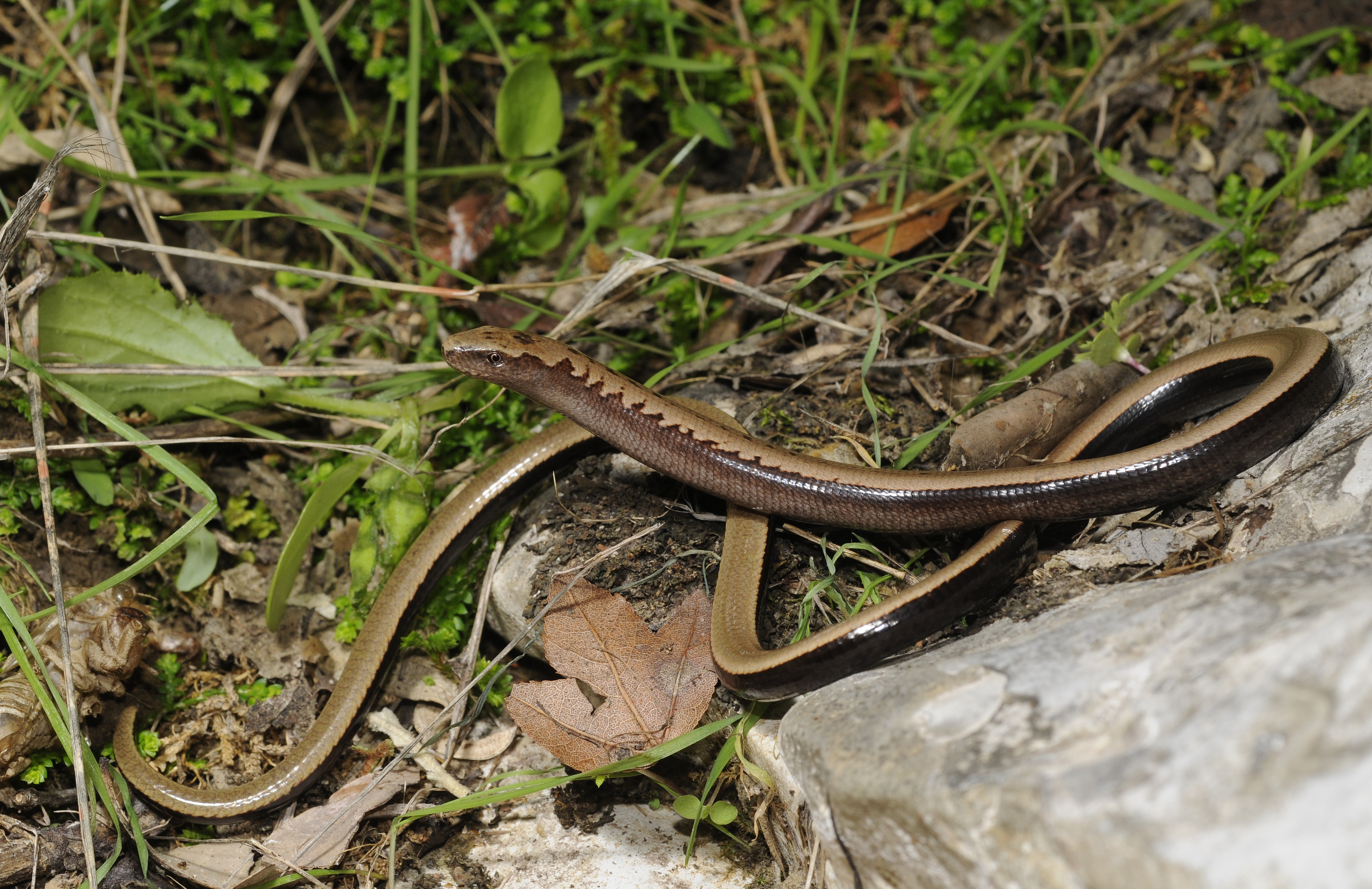

Conservation status
- Least Concern (IUCN 3.1)

Scientific classification
- Kingdom: Animalia
- Phylum: Chordata
- Class: Reptilia
- Order: Squamata
- Suborder: Anguimorpha
- Family: Anguidae
- Genus: Anguis
- Species: A. cephallonica

Binomial name
- Anguis cephallonica Werner, 1894
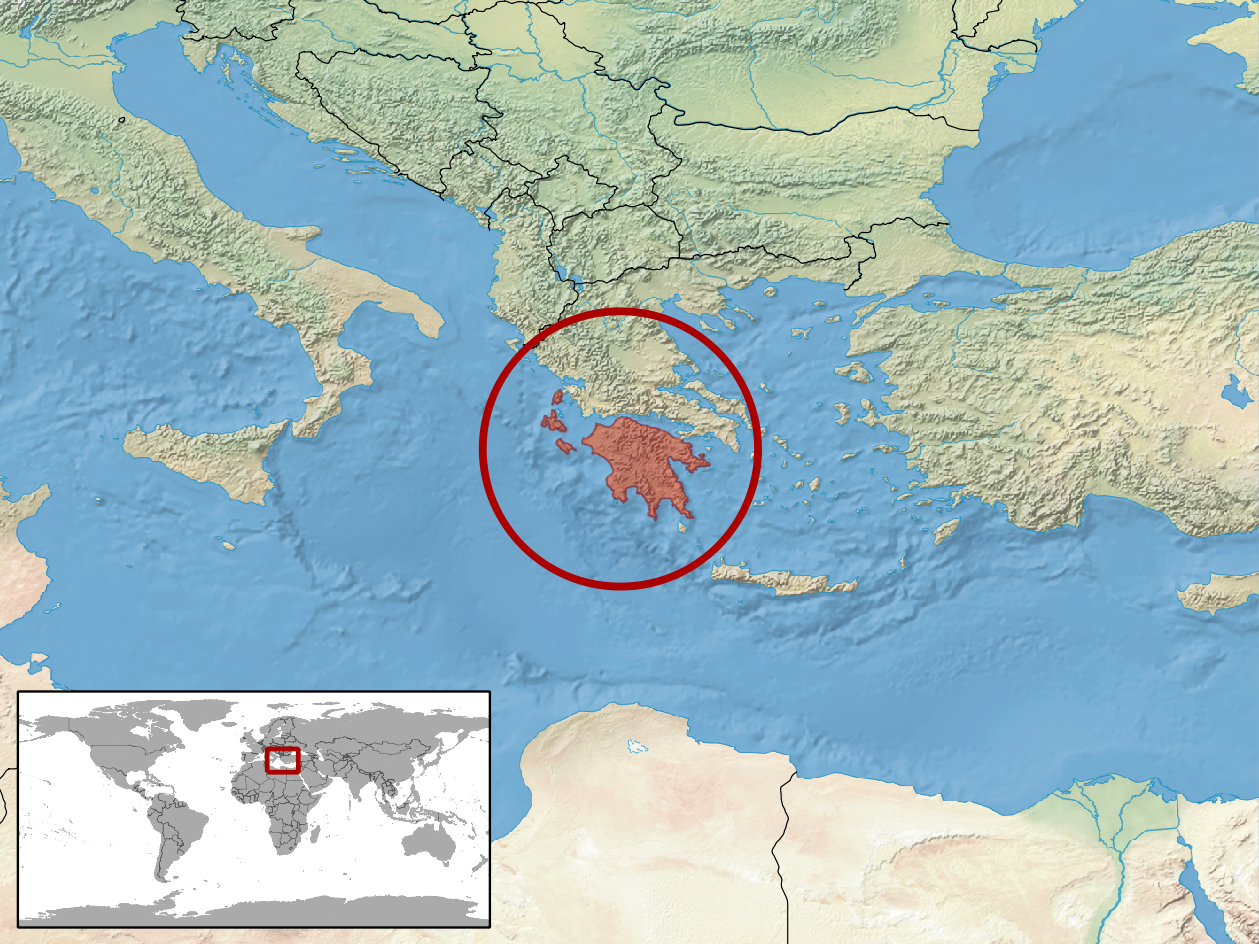

= Peloponnese slow worm =

Species of lizard

Anguis cephallonica, the Peloponnese slow worm, is a species of legless lizard in the family Anguidae endemic to Greece. It is found in the Peloponnese and islands of Cephalonia, Ithaca, and Zakynthos in the Ionian Sea, at elevations of up to 1,340 m. Its natural habitats are temperate forests, temperate shrubland, Mediterranean-type shrubby vegetation, temperate grassland, arable land, pastureland, plantations, and rural gardens. The species can be distinguished from all other slow worms by the greater number of scale rows around the body and the distinctive color pattern on its side. Peloponnese slow worms give birth to live litters of 3–26 young. They are listed as being a species of least concern on the IUCN Red List.

== Taxonomy ==
The Peloponnese slow worm is putatively thought to be sister to the Italian slow worm based on weak mitochondrial DNA evidence. These two species may have arisen from a common ancestor population that diverged after the Messinian salinity crisis.

== Description ==
The species can be distinguished from all other slow worms by the greater number of scale rows around the body, 34–36 rows in the Peloponnese slow worm compared to 23–32 rows in other slow worms. It also has a distinctive color pattern on its side made a undulating chocolate-brown line along the front of its body.

== Distribution and ecology ==
The Peloponnese slow worm is endemic to Greece where it occurs in the Peloponnese and the islands of Cephalonia, Ithaca, and Zakynthos in the Ionian Sea, at elevations of up to 1,340 m. It inhabits humid places in forests, meadows, scrubland, hedgerows, wooded streams, gardens, and farms. Like other slow worms, Peloponnese slow worms give birth to live litters of 3–26 young.

== Status ==
The slow worm is not very common, but it has a large range and is able to adapt to different habitats, and so is listed as being a species of least concern on the IUCN Red List. In the 2008 version of the list, it was listed as being near-threatened. It is typically killed if seen by humans. It occurs in several protected areas.
