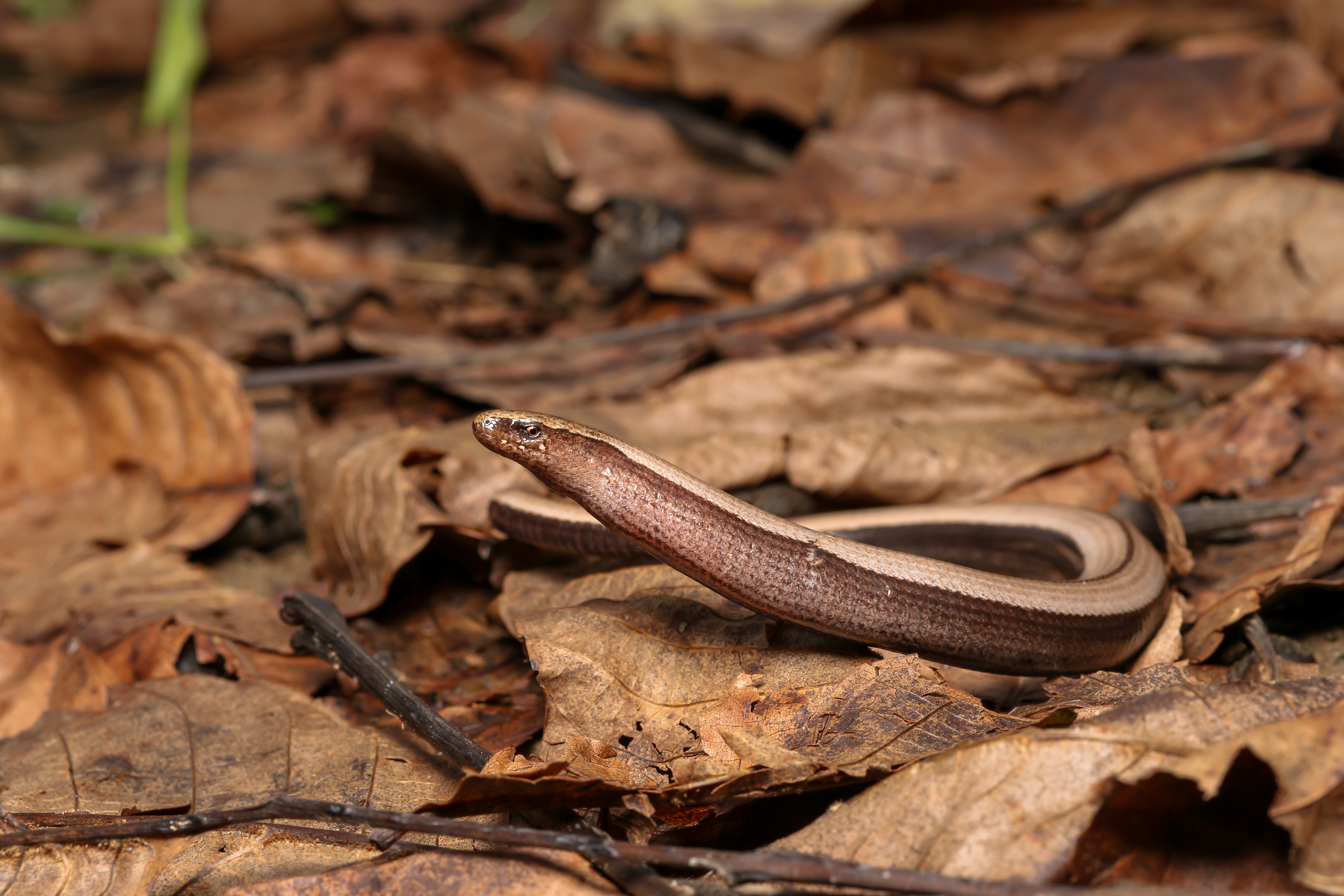

Conservation status
- Least Concern (IUCN 3.1)

Scientific classification
- Kingdom: Animalia
- Phylum: Chordata
- Class: Reptilia
- Order: Squamata
- Suborder: Anguimorpha
- Family: Anguidae
- Genus: Anguis
- Species: A. graeca

Binomial name
- Anguis graeca Bedriaga, 1881
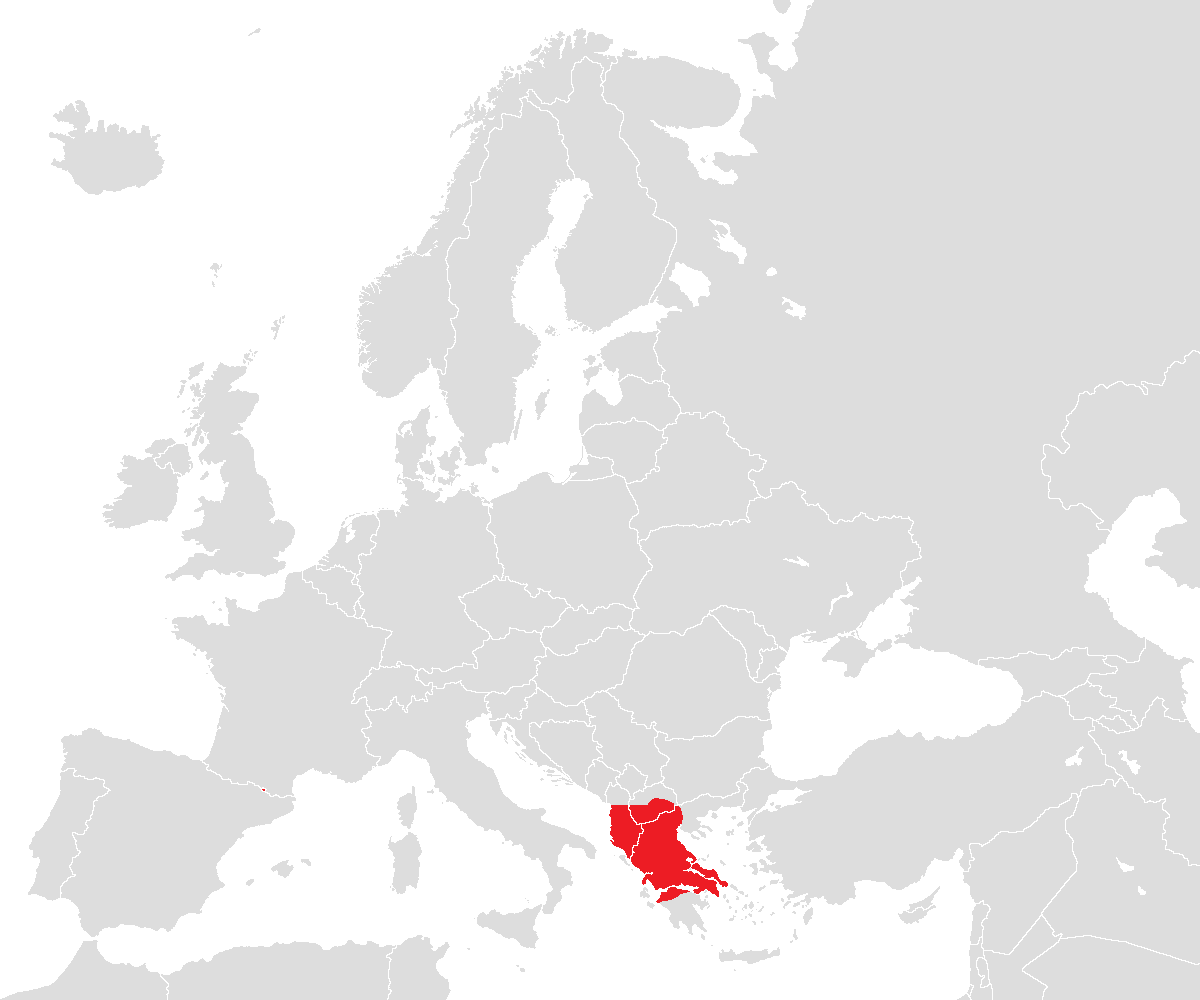

= Anguis graeca =

Species of lizard

Anguis graeca, the Greek slow worm, is a species of lizard in the family Anguidae found in Greece, Albania, and North Macedonia. It prefers to inhabit vegetated and humid areas, preferably ones with good cover of hiding spots like rocks and leaves. It is predated mainly by snakes, frogs, toads, birds, mammals and more recently proved to be prey of the lizards of the genus Lacerta as well. It engages in death feigning behavior when threatened.
