= Cryptogenic species =

Species of unknown origins

A cryptogenic species is a biological species whose origins are unknown. It can be an animal or plant, including other kingdoms or domains, such as fungi, algae, bacteria, or even viruses. The word cryptogenic is derived from Greek κρυπτός, kryptos 'hidden' and γένεσις, genesis 'origin')

In ecology, a cryptogenic species is one which may be either a native species or an introduced species, clear evidence for either origin being absent. An example is the Northern Pacific seastar (Asterias amurensis) in Alaska and Canada.

In palaeontology, a cryptogenic species is one which appears in the fossil record without clear affinities to an earlier species.

== See also ==
- Cosmopolitan distribution
- Cryptozoology
