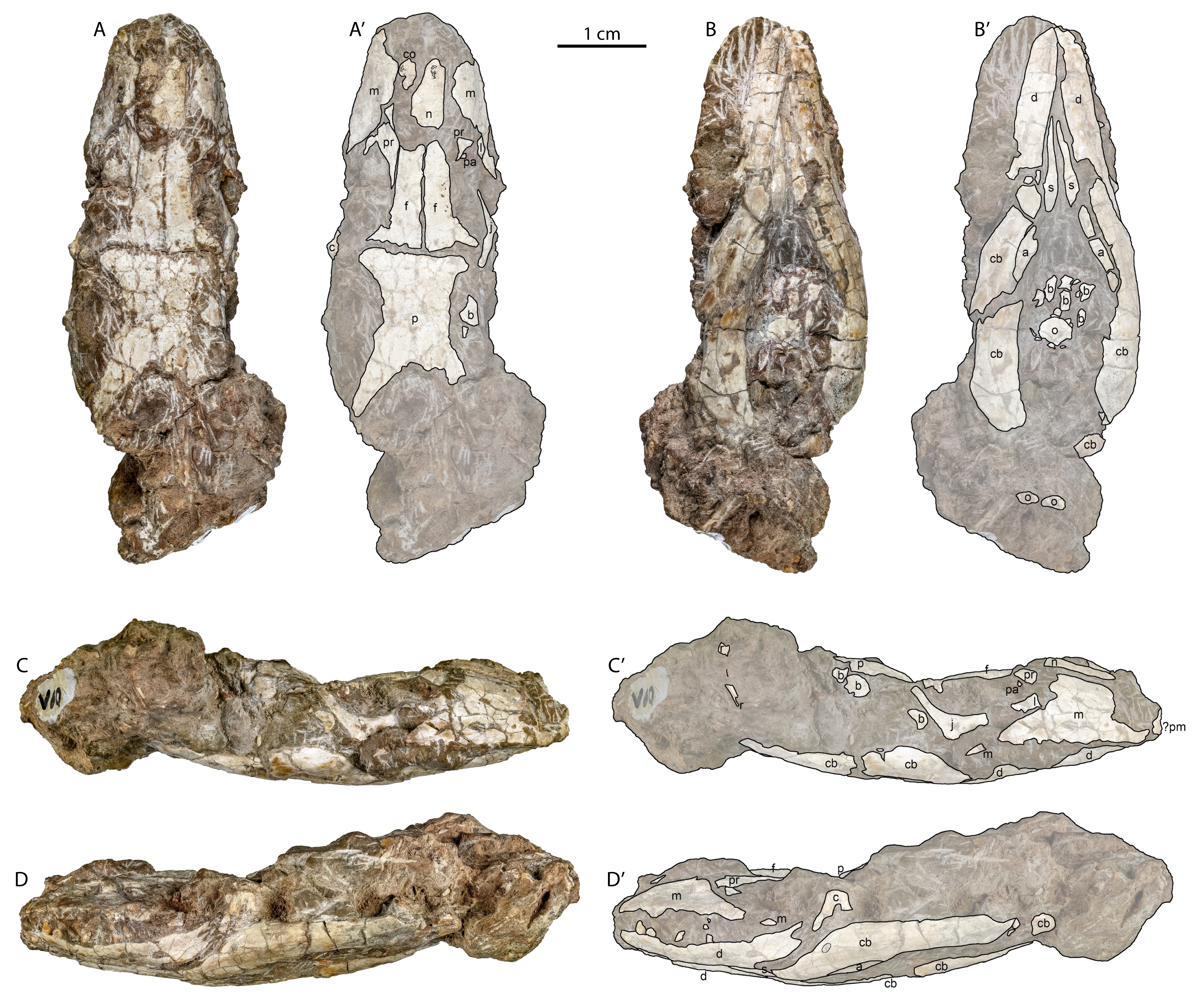
- Photographs (A–D) and interpretive drawings (A'–D') of the holotype skull

Scientific classification
- Kingdom: Animalia
- Phylum: Chordata
- Class: Reptilia
- Order: Squamata
- Suborder: Anguimorpha
- Family: Anguidae
- Subfamily: Anguinae
- Genus: †Fontisaurus; Villa et al., 2025
- Species: †F. tarumbaire

Binomial name
- †Fontisaurus tarumbaire Villa et al., 2025

= Fontisaurus =

Fontisaurus Temporal range: Late Miocene (Vallesian), ~14.8–9.4 Ma

Genus of fossil lizard

Fontisaurus (lit. 'spring lizard') is an extinct genus of anguine lizard known from the Late Miocene (Vallesian age) Vallès-Penedès Basin of Spain and the Middle Miocene of Germany . The genus contains a single species, Fontisaurus tarumbaire, known from a skull with associated osteoderms.

== Discovery and naming ==
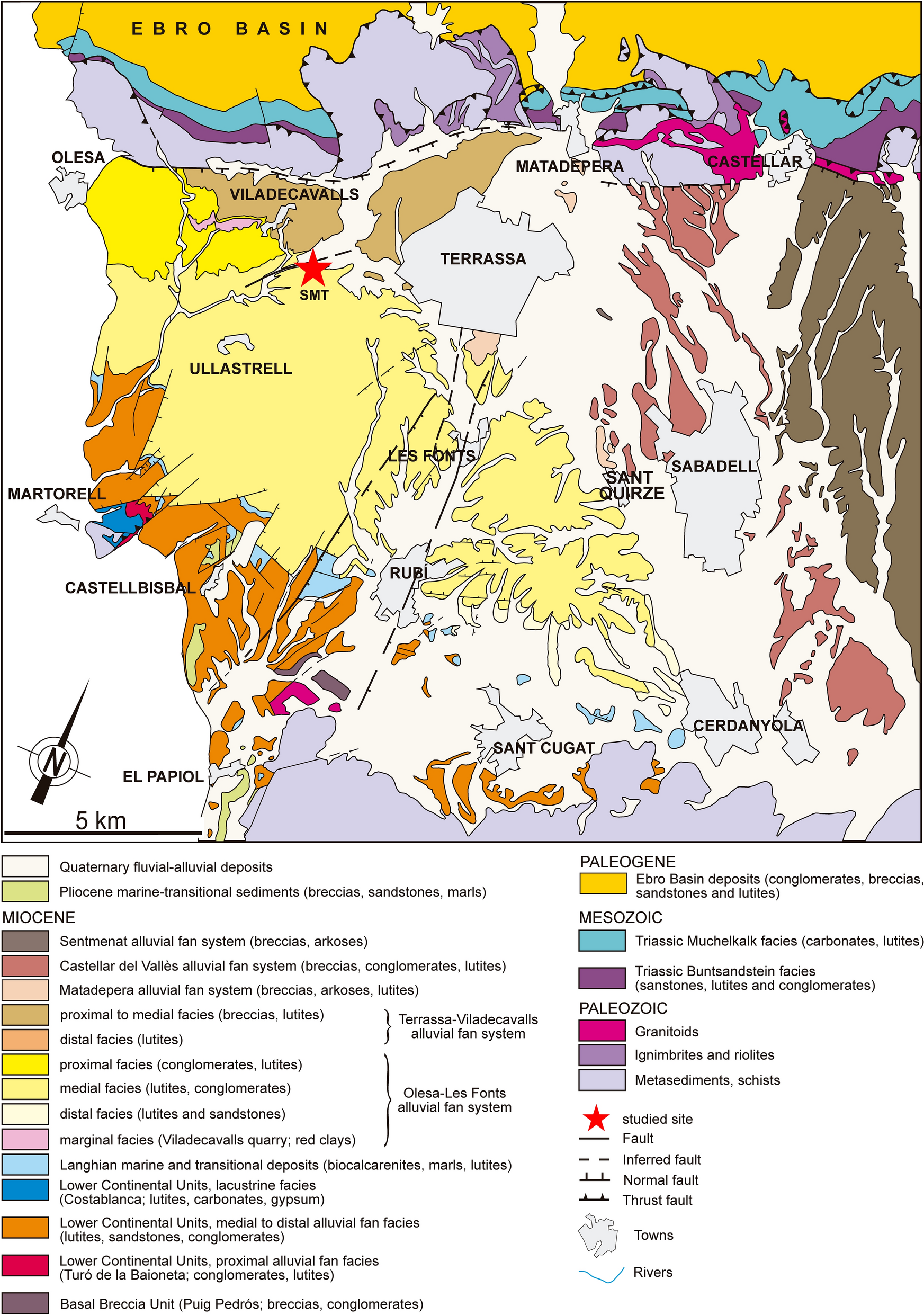
F. tarumbaire type locality (red star)

The Fontisaurus tarumbaire fossil material was discovered at the Sant Miquel de Toudell site, representing outcrops of the Vallès-Penedès Basin in Viladecavalls of Catalonia, Spain. The specimen—an articulated skull occluded with the mandible—is housed in the Museum of Natural Sciences of Barcelona, where it is permanently accessioned as specimen MGB V60. Prior to its acquisition by the museum, the skull was part of the personal collection of J.F. de Villalta, under whom a preliminary report was published by Crusafont Pairó and Villalta in 1952, identifying it as an indeterminate species of the extant legless glass lizard genus Ophisaurus (O. sp.).

In 2025, Andrea Villa and colleagues described Fontisaurus tarumbaire as a new genus and species of anguine lizard based on these fossil remains, establishing MGB V60 as the holotype specimen. The generic name, Fontisaurus, combines the Latin word fons, meaning 'spring', with the Ancient Greek σαῦρος (sauros), meaning 'lizard'. This name alludes to a local legend of the Spanish municipality from which the holotype is known, which claims that the town's water springs are guarded by small dragons, reminiscent of an extinct lizard. The specific name, tarumbaire, is a Catalan word used for those living in Viladecavalls.

In 2018, Klembara and Rummel described SNSB-BSPG 1997 XVI 466, an isolated parietal from the Middle Miocene Griesbeckerzell 1a locality of Germany. They tentatively assigned this specimen to the extinct Ophisaurus species Ophisaurus fejfari. They noted that this bone is substantially larger than the other parietals known from this species and differed in at least three characteristics (two of which may be tied to its larger size), but maintained this classification pending the discovery of better fossil material. In their 2025 description of Fontisaurus, Villa et al. referred this German fossil to their new genus, but considered it possible that it represents a species distinct from F. tarumbaire. Given the distinct sculptured texture and narrow muscular surface of SNSB-BSPG 1997 XVI 466 compared to the F. tarumbaire holotype, they regarded it as F. aff. tarumbaire.

== Classification ==
To test the affinities and relationships of Fontisaurus, Villa et al. (2026) included it in an updated version of the phylogenetic matrix of Loréal et al. (2024), which includes a wide sample of European anguids. Using constraints following the relationships of extant taxa established by molecular data, their Bayesian analysis recovered Fontisaurus as the sister taxon to a clade formed by the extant Dopasia harti (Hart's glass lizard) and Ophisaurus ventralis (Eastern glass lizard). These results are displayed in the cladogram below. Other versions of their analyses without such constraints recovered other, generally more basal, positions for Fontisaurus within the subfamily Anguinae, but its anguine affinities remained consistent.

- Anguinae (glass lizards)
  - †Odaxosaurus piger
  - - - †Ophisauriscus quadrupes
      - †"Ophisaurus" holeci
    - - †Smithosaurus echzellensis
      - - - †Fontisaurus tarumbaire
          - - Dopasia harti (Hart's glass lizard)
            - Ophisaurus ventralis (Eastern glass lizard)
        - - - Hyalosaurus koellikeri (Koelliker's glass lizard)
            - †"Ophisaurus" roqueprunensis
          - - Anguis fragilis (common slow worm)
            - - - Pseudopus apodus (European glass lizard)
                - †Pseudopus pannonicus
              - - †Pseudopus ahnikoviensis
                - †Pseudopus laurillardi
