= 2025 in reptile paleontology =

Fossil reptile research published in 2025 includes the description of new taxa, as well as other peer-reviewed publications on discoveries related to reptile paleontology.

== Lepidosauromorphs ==
=== Squamates ===
Name	Novelty	Status	Authors	Age	Type locality	Country	Notes	Images
Bavarioboa wintershofensis	Sp. nov	Valid	Ivanov et al.	Miocene		Germany	A snake belonging to the group Booidea.	
Bolg	Gen. et sp. nov	Valid	Woolley et al.	Late Cretaceous (Campanian)	Kaiparowits Formation	United States (Utah)	A monstersaurian member of Anguimorpha. The type species is B. amondol.	
Breugnathair	Gen. et sp. nov	Valid	Benson et al.	Middle Jurassic (Bathonian)	Kilmaluag Formation	United Kingdom	An early squamate belonging to the family Parviraptoridae. The type species is B. elgolensis.	
Cadurcopanoplos	Gen. et sp. nov	Valid	Lemierre & Georgalis	Eocene	Quercy Phosphorites Formation	France	A glyptosaurid. The type species is C. vaylatsensis.	
Caninosaurus	Gen. et sp. nov	Valid	Wang et al.	Late Cretaceous	Tangbian Formation	China	A borioteiioid. The type species is C. ganzhouensis.	
Cheilophis periplanetes	Sp. nov	Valid	Georgalis & Mennecart	Eocene (Ypresian)	Formation of Unios and Teredinids Sands	France	A snake belonging to the group Constrictores; a species of Cheilophis.	
Fontisaurus	Gen. et sp. nov	Valid	Villa et al.	Miocene		Spain	An anguine anguid. The type species is F. tarumbaire.	
Oneirosaurus	Gen. et sp. nov	Valid	Páramo-Fonseca et al.	Late Cretaceous (Coniacian)	Galembo Formation	Colombia	A mosasaur belonging to the subfamily Plioplatecarpinae. The type species is O. caballeroi.	
Paradoxophidion	Gen. et sp. nov	Valid	Georgalis & Jones	Eocene (Priabonian)	Headon Hill Formation	United Kingdom	An early caenophidian snake. The type species is P. richardoweni.	
Phosphoriguana	Gen. et sp. nov	Valid	Lemierre & Georgalis	Eocene	Quercy Phosphorites Formation	France	A probable member of Pleurodonta. The type species is P. peritechne.	
Pterosphenus rannensis	Sp. nov	Valid	Datta & Bajpai	Eocene (Lutetian)		India	A snake belonging to the family Palaeophiidae; a species of Pterosphenus.	
Wautaugategu	Gen. et sp. nov	Valid	Bourque & Stanley	Miocene (Barstovian)		United States (Georgia (U.S. state))	A member of the family Teiidae belonging to the subfamily Tupinambinae. The type species is W. formidus.	
Wintershofia	Gen. et sp. nov	Valid	Ivanov et al.	Miocene		Germany	A snake belonging to the family Natricidae. The type species is W. robusta.	
Zhongyuanxi	Gen. et sp. nov	Valid	Xu et al.	Late Cretaceous (possibly Maastrichtian)	Qiupa Formation	China	A member of Anguimorpha, possibly a stem-varanid. The type species is Z. jiai.	

==== Squamate research ====
- Review of studies on the origin and early evolution of squamates from the preceding years is published by Simões, Tollis & Burbrink (2025).
- A study on the biogeography of squamates throughout their evolutionary history is published by Wilenzik & Pyron (2025), who identify Europe and northeastern Asia as the most likely areas of the origin of Squamata.
- Lizard teeth showing adaptations to durophagy are described from the strata of the Deccan Intertrappean Beds from the Cretaceous-Paleogene transition from Kesavi (Madhya Pradesh, India) by Yadav & Verma (2025).
- Villa & Rummel (2025) describe a specimen of Rhodanogekko vireti from the Oligocene strata from Weißenburg (Bavaria, Germany), representing the first record of the species outside France and extending its known stratigraphic record by about 10 million years.
- Čerňanský, Tabuce & Vidalenc (2025) report the first fossil evidence of presence of scincoids and pleurodontan iguanians in the Cos locality (Quercy Phosphorites Formation, France) during the Ypresian.
- Brownstein et al. (2025) argue that the common ancestor of extant night lizards originated before the Cretaceous–Paleogene extinction event and that members of the group survived the extinction in spite of living in the areas close to the site of the Chicxulub impact crater.
- Jiang et al. (2025) review the taxonomic composition, phylogenetic affinities, morphological diversity and geographical distribution of polyglyphanodontians.
- Santos et al. (2025) describe a new specimen of Calanguban alamoi from the Lower Cretaceous Crato Formation (Brazil), designated by the authors as the neotype of the species, and interpret is as a borioteiioid (polyglyphanodontian).
- Evidence from the study population genomic data and probable Quaternary fossils, indicative of impact changes of temperature and precipitation during the Quaternary on changes of range of Rankinia diemensis, is presented by Ramm et al. (2025).
- Revision of the Paleogene fossil material of glyptosaurids from Kazakhstan and Mongolia is published by Syromyatnikova (2025).
- Syromyatnikova & Tarasova (2025) describe fossils of the legless lizard Pseudopus apodus from the Lower Pleistocene Taurida Cave (Crimea), representing the first anguid fossil found in the region and one of the geologically oldest occurrences of the species.
- A maxilla representing the first cranial material of a monitor lizard from the Miocene of India reported to date is described by Čerňanský & Patnaik (2025).
- Fossil material of a monitor lizard which might represent the latest record of Varanus marathonensis in Europe reported to date is described from the Pliocene strata from the Megalo Emvolon locality (Greece) by Drakopoulou et al. (2025).
- Song & Lindgren (2025) reconstruct soft-tissue outline of the tail fin of mosasaurs on the basis of comparisons with extant sharks, infer the presence of a bilobed tail fin in all hydropedal mosasaurs, and interpret their findings as indicating that such tail fins evolved independently at least four times in mosasaurs.
- López-Rueda et al. (2025) describe new mosasaur material from the Upper Cretaceous Labor-Tierna and Plaeners formations (Colombia), including the first record of a member of the genus Globidens from northern South America reported to date.
- A study on patterns of the foraging area preference of members of different mosasaur groups throughout the Late Cretaceous, as indicated by carbon isotope composition of tooth enamel, is published by Polcyn et al. (2025).
- A study on teeth of mosasaurs from the Campanian Bearpaw Formation (Alberta, Canada), providing evidence of dietary niche differentiation of the studied taxa, is published by Holwerda et al. (2025).
- A study on diversity of tooth shapes and likely dietary preferences of Maastrichtian mosasaurs from the Phosphates of Morocco is published by Bardet et al. (2025), who also transfer Platecarpus (?) ptychodon Arambourg (1952) to the genus Gavialimimus, and interpret it as a probable senior synonym of Gavialimimus almaghribensis.
- Evidence from the study of a tooth fragment of cf. Prognathodon sp. from the Upper Cretaceous strata in South Africa, indicating that the studied individual had a higher body temperature than closely associated Squalicorax shark, and likely higher than seawater temperature, is presented by Woolley et al. (2025).
- Grigoriev et al. (2025) describe fossil material of Latoplatecarpus cf. L. willistoni from the Campanian Rybushka Formation (Saratov Oblast, Russia), representing the first known record of the genus outside of North America.
- Longrich et al. (2025) provide new information on the teeth of Xenodens calminechari based on CT scans and a referred specimen, and support the interpretation of Xenodens as a valid, distinct taxon with unusual dental anatomy.
- During et al. (2025) describe a tooth of a mosasaurine mosasaur (likely a member of the tribe Prognathodontini) from the Hell Creek Formation (North Dakota, United States), and interpret the results of the analysis of isotopic composition of tooth enamel as indicating that the tooth most likely formed when the studied individual lived in a freshwater environment.
- Redescription of the skeletal morphology and taxonomic revision of Cadurceryx is published by Szyndlar & Georgalis (2025), who interpret the type species C. filholi as the only known species present in France during the middle and late Eocene, and consider the second species C. pearchi to be a nomen dubium.
- Scanferla, Babot & García Lopez (2025) describe a snake neurocranium from the Eocene Geste Formation (Argentina), preserving a combination of features otherwise known only in uropeltids, and report evidence of morphological convergences in the skeleton of burrowing and surface-dwelling miniaturized snakes, making it uncertain whether the uropeltid-like traits of the specimen from the Geste Formation are phylogenetically informative.
- Georgalis (2025) revises Plesiotortrix edwardsi from the Quercy Phosphorites Formation (France), and considers it to be nomen dubium.
- The oldest cranial remains of a member of Constrictores (the group including boas and pythons) described and figured from the Cenozoic of Europe to date are reported from the Eocene (Ypresian) strata from the Cos locality (Quercy Phosphorites Formation, France) by Čerňanský et al. (2025).
- A vertebra of a member of Constrictores, representing the oldest vertebra of a terrestrial snake from the Paleogene of eastern North America reported to date, is described from the Eocene Nanjemoy Formation (Virginia, United States) by Pritchard et al.(2025).
- Nascimento et al. (2025) describe fossil material of a member of the genus Boa from the Late Pleistocene Toca do Angico site (Brazil), interpreted on the basis of stable carbon isotope analyses as feeding on animals living in an open environment dominated by C_{4} vegetation.
- Alfonso-Rojas et al. (2025) describe new fossil material of Colombophis sp. and Eunectes sp. from the Socorro and Urumaco formations (Venezuela), providing evidence of existence of anacondas exceeding 5 metres in length in the Miocene.
- Fossil material of a member of the genus Acrochordus, morphologically distinct from Acrochordus dehmi and possibly representing a new species, is described from the Miocene strata from Kutch (India) by Datta & Bajpai (2025).
- Hunt & Lucas (2025) describe the first known fossil snake regurgitalites from the Eocene Messel Formation in Germany, and name new ichnotaxa Ophiemeticus smithi and Messelemeticus lehmanni.
- Venczel et al. (2025) describe new fossil material of snakes from Eocene and Oligocene localities in the Transylvanian Basin (Romania), including cf. Messelophis variatus from the Oligocene (Rupelian) strata of the Dâncu Formation which might represent the last occurrence of ungaliophiids in Europe.
- The first known assemblage of snake fossils from Taiwan, probably originating from the Middle Pleistocene Chiting Formation, is described by Lin et al. (2025).
- Petermann & Lyson (2025) compare the diversity of squamate faunas from the Cretaceous-Paleogene transition from the Denver Basin (Colorado, United States), and report evidence indicating that local squamate assemblage was severely affected by the Cretaceous–Paleogene extinction event.
- Evidence from the study of lizard and snake fossils from Eocene localities in Wyoming and North Dakota (United States), interpreted as indicative of warmer and wetter climate in mid-latitude North America during the late Eocene than indicated by earlier studies, is presented by Smith & Bruch (2025).
- Xerri et al.(2025) report the first discovery of fossil material of a wall lizard (Podarcis cf. filfolensis) and an indeterminate colubrid snake from the Pleistocene fossil record from Malta.
- Woolley, Bottjer & Smith (2025) report evidence indicating that, on global scale, the completeness of the fossil record of squamates is influenced by differences in body size and form and by lithological and depositional biases to a greater degree than by human-based sampling biases.

=== Other lepidosauromorphs ===
Name	Novelty	Status	Authors	Age	Type locality	Country	Notes	Images
Agriodontosaurus	Gen. et sp. nov	Valid	Marke et al.	Middle Triassic (Anisian)	Helsby Sandstone Formation	United Kingdom	A member of Rhynchocephalia. The type species is A. helsbypetrae.	
Marmoretta drescherae	Sp. nov	Valid	Guillaume, Puértolas-Pascual & Moreno-Azanza	Late Jurassic (Kimmeridgian)	Alcobaça Formation	Portugal	A non-lepidosaurian lepidosauromorph; a species of Marmoretta.	
Sphenodraco	Gen. et sp. nov		Beccari et al.	Late Jurassic (Tithonian)	Solnhofen Limestone	Germany	A member of Rhynchocephalia. The type species is S. scandentis.	

==== Other lepidosauromorph research ====
- Evidence of adaptations for climbing in the skeleton of Marmoretta oxoniensis is presented by Ford et al. (2025).

== Ichthyosauromorphs ==
Name	Novelty	Status	Authors	Age	Type locality	Country	Notes	Images
Eternauta	Gen. et sp. nov	Valid	Campos et al.	Late Jurassic (Tithonian)	Vaca Muerta	Argentina	A member of the family Ophthalmosauridae. The type species is E. patagonica.	
Eurhinosaurus mistelgauensis	Sp. nov	Valid	Spicher et al.	Early Jurassic (Toarcian)	Jurensismergel Formation	Germany	A parvipelvian ichthyosaur; a species of Eurhinosaurus	
Fernatator	Gen. et sp. nov	Valid	Massare et al.	Early Jurassic (Pliensbachian)	Fernie Formation	Canada (British Columbia)	A parvipelvian ichthyosaur. The type species is F. prenticei.	
Gadusaurus	Gen. et sp. nov	Valid	Pratas e Sousa et al.	Early Jurassic (Sinemurian)	Água de Madeiros Formation	Portugal	A baracromian ichthyosaur. The type species is G. aqualigneus.	
Lentamanusuchus	Gen. et sp. nov	Valid	Qiao, Iijima & Liu	Early Triassic	Jialingjiang Formation	China	A hupehsuchian. The type species is L. hubeiensis.	
Xiphodracon	Gen. et sp. nov	Valid	Lomax, Massare & Maxwell	Early Jurassic (Pliensbachian)	Charmouth Mudstone Formation	United Kingdom	A hauffiopterygian ichthyosaur. The type species is X. goldencapensis.	

=== Ichthyosauromorph research ===
- A description of the cranial anatomy of a specimen of Hupehsuchus nanchangensis is published by Zhao et al. (2025).
- Motani, Pyenson & Jiang (2025) reexamine the morphological analysis published by Fang et al. (2023), and argue that, contrary to the conclusions of these authors, there is no evidence of morphological similarities between Hupehsuchus nanchangensis and extant balaenid whales supporting the interpretation of Hupehsuchus as a balaenid-style filter feeder.
- Maisch (2025) argues that ichthyosaurs were not closely related to mesosaurs and hupehsuchians, and proposes that owenettids were the closest known relatives of ichthyosaurs.
- Delsett et al. (2025) study the vertebral microstructure in Grippia and Cymbospondylus throughout their ontogeny, and report evidence of differences between the two taxa interpreted as indicative of different ecologies, with Grippia living in shallower waters and adapting to anguilliform swimming, and with Cymbospondylus evolving faster growth and more tail-driven propulsion, and adapting to deeper diving.
- Klein et al. (2025) study morphology and histology of humeri of Grippia longirostris and a possible new ichthyosauriform taxon from the Olenekian Vikinghøgda Formation (Svalbard, Norway), providing evidence of adaptation of both taxa to aquatic lifestyle.
- Serafini et al. (2025) revise bromalites from the Lower Jurassic Posidonia Shale (Germany), interpreted as produced by Temnodontosaurus trigonodon and providing evidence that the producer fed on other ichthyosaurs and on coleoid cephalopods.
- Lindgren et al. (2025) describe a new flipper of Temnodontosaurus with soft tissue impressions including novel structures which they term "chondroderms," which would have given the flipper a serrated appearance in life and probably served a noise reduction function.
- Fischer et al. (2025) identify a remains of a gladius of a loligosepiid vampyromorph in gut contents of a specimen of Stenopterygius triscissus from the Bascharage Lagerstätte (Luxembourg), representing the first known record of an ichthyosaur feeding on a gladius-bearing octobranchian cephalopod.
- Ceballos Izquierdo et al. (2025) redescribe the lost holotype specimen of "Ichthyosaurus" torrei on the basis of available data, and interpret as most likely to be an ichthyosaur.
- Pomar, Benavides-Cabra & Narváez-Rincón (2025) describe fossil material of a member of Thunnosauria of uncertain affinities from the Hiló Formation (Colombia), representing the first record of an ichthyosaur from the Albian of South America reported to date.
- Pardo-Pérez et al. (2025) describe a gravid ichthyosaur specimen (possibly belonging to the species Myobradypterygius hauthali) from the Hauterivian strata from the Torres del Paine National Park, representing the first complete ichthyosaur specimen reported from Chile.
- Meyerkort et al. (2025) describe a phalanx bone of a brachypterygiid ichthyosaur from the middle–upper Cenomanian strata of the Gearle Siltstone (Australia), representing the geologically youngest ichthyosaur record from the Southern Hemisphere reported to date.
- Partial rostrum of a large platypterygiine ichthyosaur, preserving evidence of adaptations to feeding on hard and bony prey, is described from the Cenomanian strata from the Annopol Anticline (Poland) by Tyborowski, Gajek & Komorowski (2025).

== Sauropterygians ==
Name	Novelty	Status	Authors	Age	Type locality	Country	Notes	Images
Boyacasaurus	Gen. et sp. nov		Benavides-Cabra et al.	Early Cretaceous (Aptian)	Paja Formation	Colombia	A pliosaurid plesiosaur in the subfamily Brachaucheninae. The type species is B. sumercei.	
Carinthiasaurus	Gen. et sp. nov	Valid	Klein et al.	Middle Triassic (Ladinian)	Fellbach Limestone	Austria	A member of the family Nothosauridae. The type species is C. kandutschi.	
Lijiangosaurus	Gen. et sp. nov	Valid	Wang et al.	Middle Triassic (Anisian)	Beiya Formation	China	A nothosaur. The type species is L. yongshengensis.	
Pahasapasaurus gillettei	Sp. nov.	In press	Schmeisser McKean	Late Cretaceous (Turonian)	Tropic Shale	United States (Utah)	A polycotylid plesiosaur; a species of Pahasapasaurus.	
Plesionectes	Gen. et sp. nov	Valid	Sachs & Madzia	Early Jurassic (Toarcian)	Posidonia Shale	Germany	A basal plesiosauroid. The type species is P. longicollum.	
Traskasaura	Gen. et sp. nov	Valid	O'Keefe et al.	Late Cretaceous (Santonian)	Haslam Formation	Canada (British Columbia)	A basal elasmosaurid. The type species is T. sandrae.	

=== Sauropterygian research ===
- Su et al. (2025) describe two new specimens of Glyphoderma kangi, providing new information on the anatomy of the studied placodont.
- Ruciński et al. (2025) describe fossil material of a member of the genus Henodus from the Upper Triassic Silves Group (Portugal), expanding known geographical range of members of the genus.
- Nosotti, Confortini, & Magnuco (2025) describe a new placodont skull from the Late Triassic of Italy, and assign it to the species Macroplacus raeticus.
- A study on the skull anatomy and phylogenetic affinities of Keichousaurus hui is published by Xu et al. (2025).
- A study on the bone development throughout the ontogeny of Keichousaurus hui is published by Wang et al. (2025).
- Liu et al. (2025) describe a juvenile specimen of Brevicaudosaurus jiyangshanensis from the Middle Triassic Zhuganpo Formation (China), and interpret the differences in the morphology of teeth of juvenile and adult specimens as suggestive of a dietary shift during the ontogeny of the studied sauropterygian.
- Cabezuelo-Hernández et al. (2025) report evidence of non-infectious pathologies in the dorsal vertebrae of the holotype specimen of Paludidraco multidentatus, different from vertebral pathologies reported in other marine reptile specimens as interpreted as most likely caused by either a congenital disorder or long-term biomechanical stress.
- Description of the anatomy of the braincase of Simosaurus gaillardoti is published by London et al. (2025).
- A specimen of Lariosaurus valceresii preserved with remains of skin is described from the Ladinian strata of the Meride Limestone (Switzerland) by Renesto, Ragni & Magnani (2025).
- Revision of the diagnostic characters of Lariosaurus youngi, as well as of changes in its morphology during its ontogeny, is published by Ma et al. (2025).
- Marx et al. (2025) report evidence of preservation of skin traces, including smooth skin on the tail and scaly skin on the flippers, as well as evidence of preservation of melanosomes and keratinocytes in a plesiosaur specimen from the Lower Jurassic Posidonia Shale (Germany).
- A large nautilid specimen belonging to the genus Cenoceras, preserved with damage interpreted as most likely to be a bite mark produced by a pliosaurid, is described from the Bathonian strata in Poland by Jain et al. (2025).
- García-Guerrero et al. (2025) describe a cervical vertebra of a member of the subfamily Brachaucheninae from the Valanginian strata of the Rosablanca Formation (Colombia), representing the oldest fossil material of a large pliosaurid from the Lower Cretaceous strata in northern South America reported to date.
- Redescription and a study on the affinities of Seeleyosaurus guilelmiimperatoris is published by Sachs et al. (2025), who interpret Plesiopterys wildi as a taxon distinct from S. guilelmiimperatoris.
- Description of a new specimen of Plesiopterys wildi from the Toarcian Posidonia Shale (Germany) and a study on the phylogenetic affinities of the species is published by Marx et al. (2025).
- Kinzella, Cotton & Delsett (2025) describe pliosaurid and indeterminate plesiosaur fossil material from the Pliensbachian strata of the Hasle Formation from Bornholm, including a propodial representing the first fossil of a juvenile plesiosaur from Denmark reported to date, and a neural arch of a juvenile or paedomorphic specimen.
- New fossil material of Kimmerosaurus langhami, providing new information on the skull anatomy of members of this species, is described from the Kimmeridge Clay (Dorset, United Kingdom) by Roberts et al. (2025).
- Fossil material of a probable basal elasmosaurid is described from the Cretaceous (Albian-Cenomanian) Cambridge Greensand (United Kingdom) by O'Gorman & Benson (2025).
- Pereyra, O'Gorman & Chinsamy (2025) study the bone histology of Kawanectes lafquenianum, identifying the studied specimens as adults and identifying K. lafquenianum as a small-bodied elasmosaurid.
- O'Gorman et al. (2025) describe a partial skeleton of an osteologically immature elasmosaurid with preserved skull bones from the Upper Cretaceous Snow Hill Island Formation (Antarctica), possibly representing a taxon distinct from Vegasaurus molyi.
- Evidence of a healing fracture and periostitis is reported in elasmosaurid specimens from the Maastrichtian Snow Hill Island Formation (Antarctica) and Jagüel Formation (Argentina) by Mitidieri et al. (2025).
- New polycotylid fossil material, possibly belonging to a previously unknown large-toothed member of the group, is described from the Campanian strata in European Russia by Zverkov & Meleshin (2025).
- Zverkov, Grigoriev & Nikiforov (2025) describe new fossil material of Polycotylus sopozkoi from the Upper Cretaceous (Santonian–Campanian) strata from the Izhberda quarry (Orenburg Oblast, Russia), providing new information on the morphology of members of the species.
- The first record of gastroliths in Sulcusuchus erraini is reported by O'Gorman, Aspromonte & Matelo Mirco (2025).
- Aspromonte & O'Gormán (2025) find that changes in the plesiosaur diversity observed in the fossil record cannot be fully explained by rock availability and collection effort, and identify key Mesozoic intervals representing high-priority targets for future sampling of plesiosaur fossils.

== Archosauromorphs ==
=== Other archosauromorphs ===
Name	Novelty	Status	Authors	Age	Type locality	Country	Notes	Images
Akidostropheus	Gen. et sp. nov	Valid	Schubul, Marsh & Kligman	Late Triassic (Norian)	Chinle Formation	United States (Arizona)	A tanystropheid archosauromorph. The type species is A. oligos.	
Calamosuchus	Gen. et comb. nov	Valid	Sues & Schoch	Late Triassic (Carnian)	Stuttgart Formation	Germany	A probable early-diverging phytosaur. The type species is "Zanclodon" arenaceus Fraas, 1896.	
Manistropheus	Gen. et sp. nov	Valid	Ezcurra, Sues & Fröbisch	Permian (Wuchiapingian)	Werra Formation	Germany	An early-diverging member of Archosauromorpha. The type species is M. kulicki.	
Retymaijychampsa	Gen. et sp. nov	Valid	Müller	Triassic (Ladinian or Carnian)	Santa Maria Formation	Brazil	A member of the family Proterochampsidae. The type species is R. beckerorum.	
Thuringopelta	Gen. et sp. nov	Valid	Sues & Schoch	Late Triassic (Carnian)	Stuttgart Formation	Germany	A member of the family Doswelliidae. The type species is T. werneburgi.	

==== Other archosauromorph research ====
- New information on the anatomy of the skull of Protorosaurus speneri is provided by Schoch et al. (2025).
- Dalle-Laste et al. (2025) report the discovery of two cervical vertebrae of a malerisaurine azendohsaurid from the Norian strata of the Candelária Sequence of the Santa Maria Supersequence (Brazil), representing the first record of an allokotosaurian from South America reported to date.
- A study on the tooth attachment in three specimens of Stenaulorhynchus stockleyi from the Manda Formation (Tanzania) is published by Mestriner et al. (2025), who find that rhynchosaur tooth attachment involved three tissues (alveolar bone, cellular cementum and a mineralized periodontal ligament) that are plesiomorphic to amniotes in general, and that claims of presence of a "bone of attachment" in rhynchosaurs that ankylosed their teeth resulted from misinterpretation of these three separate tissues.
- A juvenile (probably perinate) specimen of Macrocephalosaurus mariensis is described from the Santa Maria Formation (Brazil) by Morais et al. (2025).
- Colombi et al. (2025) report the discovery of an aggregation of four juvenile specimens of Hyperodapedon sanjuanensis from the Ischigualasto Formation (Argentina), interpreted as probable evidence of social and burrowing behavior of the studied rhynchosaur.
- Müller (2025) describes fossil material of a proterochampsid from the Middle Triassic strata from the Posto site (Pinheiros-Chiniquá Sequence; Brazil), possibly representing a previously undescribed species and expanding known diversity of Middle Triassic proterochampsids from South America.
- Description of the anatomy of the skull of Tropidosuchus romeri is published by Mamami et al. (2025).
- Cotuli-Cereda et al. (2025) provide new information on the anatomy of the tarsus of Chanaresuchus bonapartei on the basis of the study of new specimens from the Chañares Formation (Argentina).
- López-Rojas, Moreno-Azanza & Puértolas-Pascual (2025) provide evidence indicating that study of the anatomy of bones of the posterior region of phytosaur mandibles can reveal phylogenetically informative characters, and provide taxonomic identifications for two phytosaur specimens: NOVA-FCT-DCT 5396 from the Silves Group in Portugal (Angistorhinus cf. talainti) and NMMNHS P-4256 from the Bull Canyon Formation in New Mexico (cf. Machaeroprosopus).
- Evidence from the study of a size series of "Redondasaurus" from the Coelophysis Quarry at Ghost Ranch (Chinle Formation; New Mexico, United States), indicating that changes the skull morphology between early and late-diverging phytosaur taxa were mirrored in changes in the skull morphology of "Redondasaurus" during its ontogeny, is presented by Goldsmith & Stocker (2025).

== Turtles ==
Name	Novelty	Status	Authors	Age	Type locality	Country	Notes	Images
Allaeochelys meylani	Sp. nov	Valid	Rollot et al.	Miocene (Burdigalian)	Moghra Formation	Egypt	A member of the family Carettochelyidae; a species of Allaeochelys.	
Asmodochelys leviathan	Sp. nov	Valid	Smith, Adrian & Kline	Late Cretaceous (Maastrichtian)	Neylandville Marl	United States (Texas)	A member of the family Ctenochelyidae; a species of Asmodochelys.	
Byeoljubuchelys	Gen. et sp. nov	Valid	Kim et al.	Early Cretaceous (Aptian–Albian)	Hasandong Formation	South Korea	A member of the family Carettochelyidae. The type species is B. yeosuensis.	
Calvarichelys	Gen. et sp. nov	Valid	Oriozabala et al.	Late Cretaceous (Campanian–Maastrichtian)	La Colonia Formation	Argentina	A member of the family Chelidae. The type species is C. coloniensis.	
Cattoiemys	Gen. et comb. nov	Valid	De la Fuente et al.	Paleocene	Maíz Gordo Formation	Argentina	A member of the family Podocnemididae. The type species is "Podocnemis" argentinensis Cattoi & Freiberg (1958).	
Chelonoidis pucara	Sp. nov	Disputed	Agnolín & Chimento	Pleistocene (Lujanian)	Lujan Formation	Argentina	A tortoise, a species of Chelonoidis. Considered to be a nomen dubium by Vlachos & de la Fuente (2025).	
Craspedochelys renzi	Sp. nov	Valid	Cadena et al.	Early Cretaceous (Hauterivian)	Moina Formation	Colombia	A "plesiochelyid".	
Elkanemys caelestis	Sp. nov	Valid	Sarda & Maniel	Late Cretaceous (Turonian–Coniacian)	Portezuelo Formation	Argentina		
Euclastes montenati	Sp. nov	Valid	De Lapparent de Broin et al.	Paleocene (Thanetian)	Bracheux Formation	France	A sea turtle belonging to the family Euclastidae; a species of Euclastes.	
Helianthochelys	Gen. et sp. nov	Valid	Sterli et al.	Miocene (Burdigalian)	Gaiman Formation	Argentina	A sea turtle belonging to the family Dermochelyidae. The type species is H. redondita.	
Manouria morla	Sp. nov	Valid	Chroust, Szczygielski & Luján	Miocene (Burdigalian)	Most Formation	Czech Republic	A tortoise, a species of Manouria.	
Marocokatognathus	Gen. et sp. nov		De Lapparent de Broin, Murelaga & Vacant	Paleocene-Eocene transition		Morocco	A member of the family Cheloniidae. The type species is M. jimenezi.	
Pelusios awashi	Sp. nov		Adrian et al.	Pliocene	Hadar Formation	Ethiopia	A species of Pelusios.	
Progeoclemys	Gen. et sp. nov	Valid	Zvonok & Danilov	Eocene (Lutetian)	Buchak Formation	Luhansk Oblast	A member of the family Geoemydidae. The type species is P. latipalata.	
Shakiremys	Gen. et sp. nov	Valid	Cadena et al.	Miocene	La Victoria Formation	Colombia	A member of the family Podocnemididae. The type species is S. colombiana.	
Syriemys	Gen. et sp. nov		Alhalabi et al.	Eocene		Syria	A member of the family Podocnemididae belonging to the tribe Stereogenyini. Genus includes new species S. lelunensis.	
Tavachelydra	Gen. et sp. nov	Valid	Lyson et al.	Paleocene (Danian/Puercan)	Denver Formation	United States (Colorado)	A member of Pan-Chelydridae. The type species is T. stevensoni.	
Thaichelys	Gen. et comb. nov.		Szczygielski et al.	Late Triassic (Norian)	Huai Hin Lat Formation	Thailand	A member of the family Proterochersidae. The type species is "Proganochelys" ruchae.	
Ueloca	Gen. et sp. nov	Valid	Gentry et al.	Oligocene (Rupelian)	Byram Formation	United States (Alabama)	A member of the family Dermochelyidae. The type species is U. colemanorum	
Wabanbara	Gen. et sp. nov		White, Gillespie & Hand	Miocene	Riversleigh World Heritage Area	Australia	A member of the family Chelidae. The type species is W. ringtailensis.	
Zealosphargis	Gen. et comb. nov.	Valid	Gentry et al.	Eocene (Bartonian)	Waihao Greensand	New Zealand	A member of the family Dermochelyidae. The type species is "Psephophorus" terrypratchetti (Köhler, 1995).	

=== Turtle research ===
- Karl, Tichy & Safi (2025) interpret the holotype of Priscochelys hegnabrunnensis from the Ladinian Muschelkalk strata from Hegnabrunn (Germany) as a fragment of the carapace of the oldest known stem representative of the turtle clade.
- Evidence indicating that the arrangement of the rostral vasculature present in extant turtles can be traced back at least to the last common ancestor of mesochelydians is presented by Tada et al. (2025).
- Ferreira & Evers (2025) study the neuroanatomy of Kayentachelys aprix and Eileanchelys waldmani, and interpret it as consistent with a terrestrial lifestyle of the former taxon and with an aquatic habit of the latter one.
- Oriozabala, de la Fuente & Sterli (2025) describe the anatomy of the postcranial skeleton of Patagoniaemys gasparinae.
- New fossil material of Plastremys lata, providing new information on the anatomy of members of this species, is described from the Lower Cretaceous (Albian) Escucha Formation (Spain) by Pérez-García et al. (2025).
- The first known case of a skeletal pathology in a helochelydrid (a specimen of Plastremys lata from the Escucha Formation) is reported by Guerrero, Cobos & Pérez-García (2025).
- A study on pathologies of plesiochelyid shells from the Kimmeridgian strata from the Krzyżanowice site (Poland), including borings interpreted as produced during the life of the turtles and likely resulting from parasitism or predation attempts, is published by Tyborowski & Sienkiewicz (2025).
- Neto et al. (2025) describe new fossil material of Chelus colombiana from the Miocene Solimões Formation (Brazil), and interpret its morphology as supporting the presence of a single species of Chelus in the Miocene of South America.
- Fossil material of a member of the genus Phrynops distinct from Phrynops paranensis is described from the Miocene Palo Pintado Formation (Argentina) by de la Fuente et al. (2025).
- Pérez-García (2025) revises the fossil material of "Podocnemis" parva and "P." judaea, interprets the latter species as a junior synonym of the former one, and confirms assignment of "P." parva to the bothremydid genus Algorachelus.
- A study on the neuroanatomy of Azzabaremys moragjonesi, providing evidence of convergences of its neuroanatomical structures with those of other turtles adapted to marine environments, is published by Martín-Jiménez & Pérez-García (2025).
- Tong et al. (2025) describe the cranial morphology of Foxemys mechinorum from the Late Cretaceous Massecaps locality (France), reporting that the cranial differences exhibited in the studied specimens are interpreted as intraspecific variation or ontogeny.
- A study on the neuroanatomy of Taphrosphys ippolitoi is published by Martín-Jiménez, Catalá Montolio & Pérez-García (2025).
- Fossil material of a member of the genus Neochelys, possibly distinct from other known members of this genus, is described from the Eocene (Bartonian) Mazaterón Formation (Spain) by Pérez-García et al. (2025).
- Bogado, Pinheiro & Romano (2025) describe new fossil material of "Podocnemis" brasiliensis from the Adamantina Formation (Brazil), revise the fossil material attributed to this species, and interpret "P." brasiliensis as a valid taxon of uncertain phylogenetic placement within Pan-Podocnemididae.
- The oldest fossil material of a member of the genus Basilemys from North America reported to date is described from the Upper Cretaceous (Turonian–Coniacian transition) Frontier Formation (Montana, United States) by Clark et al. (2025).
- Ke et al. (2025) describe a probable male specimen of Nanhsiungchelys cf. yangi from the Upper Cretaceous (Campanian to Maastrichtian) Zhenshui Formation (Guangdong, China), and study the phylogenetic affinities of the genus Nanhsiungchelys within the family Nanhsiungchelyidae.
- A study on the shell histology of Maastrichtian and Paleocene trionychids is published by Ong, Snively & Woodward (2025).
- Revision of shell characters for the studies of the phylogenetic relationships of extant and extinct pan-trionychids is published by Joyce (2025).
- A revised list of skull characters for the studies of the phylogenetic relationships of extant and fossil trionychids is provided by Girard & Joyce (2025).
- A probable juvenile turtle specimen interpreted as the first known pan-trionychid Upper Cretaceous of southern China is described from the Cenomanian–Turonian Zhoutian Formation by Ke, Han & Joyce (2025).
- Kear et al. (2025) describe a specimen of Rhinochelys nammourensis from the Cenomanian Sannine Formation (Lebanon) representing the oldest known sea turtle specimen preserving fossil evidence of soft tissues, including residual skin of flippers, tail and neck providing evidence that its flippers lacked scales, and study the phylogenetic relationships and evolutionary history of sea turtles, finding it most likely that members of the groups originally had shell scutes and scaly limbs, and that there were several independent losses of scales within the group.
- A study on the composition of the turtle assemblage from the Santonian or Campanian strata from the Izhberda locality (Orenburg Oblast, Russia) is published by Zvonok, Mizetskaya & Danilov (2025).
- Revision of the fossil material of marine turtles from the Campanian and Maastrichtian localities in the Penza Oblast (Russia) is published by Zvonok et al. (2025).
- Jannello et al. (2025) study shell histology of marine turtles from the Eocene La Meseta and Submeseta formations (Antarctica), and report that histological variation of the studied sample of fossils exceeds its macromorphological variation.
- Guerrero et al. (2025) describe and analyze the different types of bioerosion marks present in the shells of the pancheloniids Eochelone brabantica and Puppigerus camperi of the middle Eocene (Lutetian) of Belgium.
- A caudal vertebra of a sea turtle interpreted as comparable in size with the type specimen of Archelon ischyros is described from the Cenomanian–Santonian strata from the Malyy Prolom locality (Ryazan Oblast, Russia) by Danilov et al. (2025).
- Footprint traces interpreted as likely produced by a stampede of sea turtles panicked by an earthquake are reported from the Campanian strata from Monte Cònero (Italy) by Sandroni et al. (2025).
- Redescription of Glyptochelone suyckerbuykii is published by Menon & Joyce (2025).
- Fossil material of cf. Caretta sp., representing the first fossil sea turtle reported from Taiwan, is described from the Pleistocene strata of the Yuching Shale by Liaw, Chuang & Tsai (2025).
- New tortoise fossil material, possibly representing the oldest fossil material of a member of the genus Solitudo reported to date, is described from the Miocene strata from Gargano (Italy) by Georgalis et al. (2025).
- A study on the anatomy and affinities of "Testudo" punica is published by Vlachos (2025), who interprets the studied tortoise as more likely related to members of the genera Titanochelon and Stigmochelys than to members of the genus Centrochelys.
- Vega-Pagán et al. (2025) describe new fossil material of Titanochelon richardi from the Miocene strata from the Vallès-Penedès Basin (Spain), and interpret T. richardi as a species distinct from T. bolivari.
- Mulè et al. (2025) report the first discovery of fossil material of a tortoise belonging to the genus Testudo from the Pliocene strata in Italy.
- Marquina-Blasco et al. (2025) identify fossil material of the Hermann's tortoise in the Pleistocene strata from the Buena Pinta Cave site (Calvero de la Higuera Archaeological Complex, Spain), providing evidence of broader ecological tolerance of the Pleistocene Iberian populations of the studied species compared to extant ones.
- Mohsen Muhammed et al. (2025) study the composition of the turtle assemblage from the Bahariya Formation (Egypt), providing evidence of presence of araripemydids (the first record of the family from the Late Cretaceous of North Africa), bothremydids and sea turtles.
- Lehman et al. (2025) describe new fossil material of turtles from the Upper Cretaceous Aguja and Javelina formations (Texas), United States), including the first records of Denazinemys nodosa, Neurankylus baueri and Thescelus rapiens from the studied formations, as well as trionychids other than cf. Aspideretoides, likely kinosternoids and chelydrids.
- A study on the composition of the turtle assemblage from the Upper Cretaceous Menefee Formation (New Mexico, United States) is published by Adrian, Smith & McDonald (2025), who describe fossil material extending known stratigraphic ranges of Neurankylus baueri, Scabremys ornata and the genera Thescelus and Basilemys.
- Sterli & Vlachos (2025) revise the diversity and distribution of turtles from the southern part of Gondwana.

== Other reptiles ==
Name	Novelty	Status	Authors	Age	Type locality	Country	Notes	Images
Amenoyengi	Gen. et sp. nov	Valid	Jenkins et al.	Permian (Lopingian)	Madumabisa Mudstone Formation	Zambia	A member of the family Captorhinidae belonging to the subfamily Moradisaurinae. The type species is A. mpunduensis.	
Akkedops	Gen. et sp. nov	Valid	Mooney, Scott & Reisz	Late Permian	Endothiodon Assemblage Zone	South Africa	A stem-saurian. The type species is A. bremneri.	
Fabanychus	Gen. et sp. nov		Sodano et al.	Late Triassic	Chinle Formation	United States (Arizona)	A member of Drepanosauromorpha. The type species is F. monos.	
Kapes signus	Sp. nov	Valid	Riccetto et al.	Middle Triassic (Anisian)		Spain	A procolophonid.	
Mirasaura	Gen. et sp. nov	Valid	Spiekman et al.	Middle Triassic (Anisian)	Grès à Voltzia Formation	France	A drepanosauromorphan. The type species is M. grauvogeli.	
Yinshanosaurus	Gen. et sp. nov	Valid	Yi & Liu	Late Permian	Naobaogou Formation	China	A pareiasaur. The type species is Y. angustus.	

=== Other reptile research ===
- New information on the anatomy of the skull of Protorothyris archeri is provided by Jenkins, Behlke & Sues (2025).
- Piñeiro et al. (2025) reevaluate purported evidence for the presence of tail autotomy in mesosaurs, and consider it more likely that purported evidence of autotomy actually shows that mesosaurs may display a previously undocumented vertebral type in their caudal vertebrae.
- A redescription of the skull anatomy of Milleropsis pricei is published by Jenkins et al. (2025) based on μCT data.
- A redescription of the skull anatomy of Milleretta rubidgei is published by Jenkins et al. (2025) based on μCT data.
- Redescription of Permotriturus herrei, based on data from the holotype and from a new specimen from Tatarstan (Russia), is published by Bulanov (2025).
- Martinez & Jenkins (2025) compare tooth morphology in procolophonids and extant lizards, and interpret procolophonids as largely herbivorous but likely adapted to feeding on plants different from those eaten by lizards.
- Smith et al. (2025) study the taphonomy of aggregations of skeletons of Procolophon trigoniceps from Brazil, South Africa and Antarctica, interpreted as indicating that the studied reptiles lived in environments switching from drought to deluge conditions in response to climatic instability, and interpret P. trigoniceps as a likely group-living, fossorial animal.
- Boyarinova & Golubev (2025) study the morphology of osteoderms of late Permian pareiasaurs from Eastern Europe, and support the validity of the genus Proelginia.
- Boyarinova & Golubev (2025) revise the fossil record of postcranial osteoderms of pareiasaurs from the upper part of the regional Severodvinian stage in Eastern Europe.
- Novak, Ide & Sidor (2025) describe the morphology and arrangement of the osteoderms of Bunostegos akokanensis.
- Redescription of the anatomy and a study on the affinities of Galesphyrus capensis is published by Buffa, Jenkins & Benoit (2025).
- Evidence indicating that Youngina capensis had a stapes with similar displacement capability and morphology to extant squamates with tympanic hearing is presented by Jenkins et al. (2025).
- Redescription and a study on the affinities of Thadeosaurus colcanapi is published by Buffa et al. (2025).
- Buffa et al. (2025) study the morphology and bone histology of the wing skeleton of Weigeltisaurus, and reconstruct the musculoskeletal organization of the weigeltisaurid wing.
- Matsumoto, Manabe & Evans (2025) describe new fossil material of members of Choristodera from the Lower Cretaceous Okurodani Formation (Japan), expanding known diversity of members of the group from the studied formation.
- Kuzmin & Vitenko (2025) study the cranial anatomy of choristoderes, and report evidence of presence of a mosaic of plesiomorphic and derived morphological characters in their middle ear.

== Reptiles in general ==
- Long et al. (2025) describe tracks produced by an amniote (probably early member of Sauropsida) from the Carboniferous (Tournaisian) Snowy Plains Formation (Victoria, Australia), providing evidence that the crown group of Amniota is, at a minimum, only marginally younger than the Devonian/Carboniferous transition; the authors also describe amniote tracks from the Serpukhovian to Bashkirian Wałbrzych Formation (Poland), similar to tracks assigned to the ichnogenus Notalacerta that were likely produced by a sauropsid.
- Jenkins et al. (2025) revise the phylogeny of stem reptiles based on synchrotron data and an expansive phylogenetic dataset, recovering the Millerettidae as the sister group to the Neodiapsida in a newly named clade Parapleurota, provide evidence rejecting the monophyly of 'Parareptilia', 'Eureptilia', and 'Diapsida', and discuss the stepwise acquisition of anatomical characters seen in crown group reptiles.
- Huttenlocker et al. (2025) describe new fossil material (jaws and teeth) of reptiles from the Carboniferous–Permian Halgaito Formation (Utah, United States), including two previously unrecognized taxa with thecodont tooth implantation (and indeterminate member of Bolosauria and an amniote of uncertain affinities) and expanding known diversity of small reptiles from the studied formation.
- Flannery-Sutherland et al. (2025) study the biogeography of Permian and Triassic members of Archosauromorpha, and interpret the fossil record as consistent with European origin of the group in the Kungurian and widespread dispersals of its members beginning in the Wordian, but note the possibility of impact of sampling biases on estimates of the areas of origination of Archosauromorpha and its subgroups.
- Wang et al. (2025) provide new age estimates from the strata of the Lower Triassic Nanlinghu Formation (China) preserving fossils of the Chaohu fauna, indicating that it is the oldest known marine reptile fauna with precise age constraints.
- Caldwell et al. (2025) revise the anatomical evidence for squamate affinities of Cryptovaranoides microlanius presented by Whiteside, Chambi-Trowell & Benton (2024), and interpret the studied reptile as unlikely to be a squamate.
- Review of the fossil record of Triassic-Jurassic reptiles from the Connecticut Valley (Connecticut and Massachusetts, United States) is published by Galton, Regalado Fernández & Farlow (2025), who consider Ammosaurus major to be a separate taxon from Anchisaurus polyzelus.
- Gordon et al. (2025) use a phylogenetic machine-learning approach to determine the distribution of soft-tissue flippers and aquatic habits in extinct amniotes.
- Fossil material of nothosauroids, indeterminate eosauropterygians and a member of the genus Macrocnemus is described from the Ladinian Sceltrich beds (Meride Limestone, Monte San Giorgio, Switzerland) by Renesto & Magnani (2025), providing evidence of similarity of reptile faunas from the Sceltrich beds and underlying Cassina beds.
- Evidence from the study of the phosphate oxygen isotope composition of plesiosaur, ichthyosaur and metriorhynchid fossil material from the Middle and Upper Jurassic strata in France and Upper Jurassic to Lower Cretaceous strata in Norway, interpreted as consistent with homeothermy and endothermy in ichthyosaurs, poikilothermy and endothermy in plesiosaurs, and uncertain thermoregulation strategy resulting in poikilothermy in metriorhynchids, is presented by Séon et al. (2025).
- Sambuichi, Tsunogai & Nakagawa (2025) provide new calculations of body temperatures of plesiosaurs and mosasaurs, recovering them as closer to body temperatures of regionally endothermic sharks than those of marine mammals.
- White, Fischer & McCurry (2025) calculate the load-bearing capabilities of teeth of ichthyosaurs, sauropterygians, thalattosuchians and mosasaurids.
- Fischer et al. (2025) evaluate possible skeletal proxies for assessing body length in ichthyosaurs, mosasaurs and pelagic thalattosuchians, and identify trunk length and centrum dimensions as strong predictors of body length.
- Marquina-Blasco et al. (2025) describe the assemblage of reptile fossils from the Miocene strata from the Crevillente 2 and Crevillente 15 sites (Spain), possibly including the oldest fossil material of a member of the genus Timon reported to date, and interpret the studied fossils as indicating that the Vallesian Crisis did not have a major impact on the herpetofaunal communities of the Iberian Peninsula.
- Evidence from the study of extant reptiles, indicative of the utility of studies of calcium and strontium isotope composition of hard tissues for reconstructions of diets of fossil reptiles, is presented by Weber et al. (2025).
- Scott et al. (2025) review the studies on bone pathologies and their healing in extant and extinct reptiles, present a new framework utilizing methods from the anthropological sciences to distinguish traumatic damage from similarly presenting features, and evaluate the utility of bone pathologies for reconstructions of behavior of extinct reptiles.
- Brignon (2025) presents lithographic plates presenting fossils of Jurassic reptiles from the Rhône basin (France) from an album commissioned by Claude Jourdan, and revises nomenclatural acts related to the specimens presented on these plates.
