= Ville Formation =

Geologic formation in Germany

- Stratigraphic range: Neogene
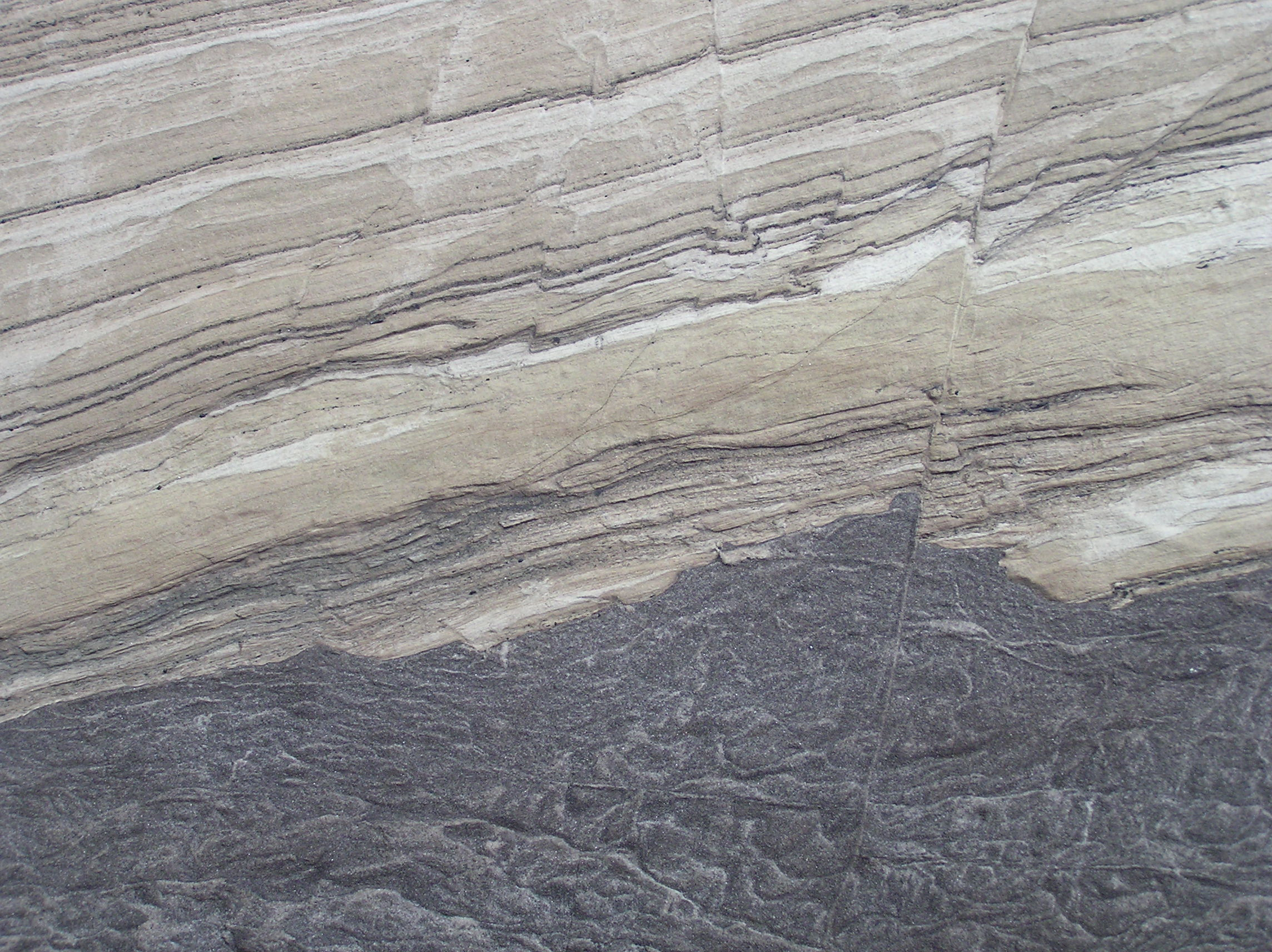
- Frimmersdorf sand and lignite
- Type: Geological formation

Location
- Country: Germany

The Ville Formation is a geologic formation in Germany. It preserves fossils dating back to the Neogene period. Lignite of the Ville Formation is excavated in North Rhine-Westphalia.

== Description ==
The Middle Miocene Hambach 6C site located within the Ville Formation is believed to have been deposited in an estuarine setting in a large fluviatile system with extended coal swamps surrounding it, as supported by sedimentological and palaeobotanical evidence. Many tetrapod remains found in the Ville Formation are associated with tropical elements such as primates, chameleons and carettochelyine turtles, suggesting the age of the fauna to be at approximately 15.5 Ma during the Middle Miocene Climate Transition. The paleoflora of the formation also supports a tropical-like climate at the time of deposition.

The younger late Pliocene (approximately 2.5 Ma) sites of Hambach 11 & 13 are believed to be deposited in oxygenated water and currents in a river channel setting in close vicinity to lakes or oxbows, as supported by sedimentological and palaeobotanical evidence

== Fossil content ==
=== Mammals ===
==== Rodents ====
Rodents reported from the Ville Formation
Genus	Species	Presence	Age	Material	Notes	Images
Myoglis	M. meini	Hambach 6C.	Middle Miocene.	Numerous teeth.	A dormouse.	
Steneofiber	S. depereti	Hambach 6C.	Middle Miocene.	6 mandibles and 56 isolated teeth.	A castorid.	

==== Ungulates ====
Ungulates reported from the Ville Formation
Genus	Species	Presence	Age	Material	Notes	Images
Orygotherium	O. escheri	Hambach 6C.	Middle Miocene.	An isolated molar.	A ruminant.	

=== Reptiles ===
==== Squamates ====
Squamates reported from the Ville Formation
Genus	Species	Presence	Age	Material	Notes	Images
Anguidae	Anguidae indet. 1	Hambach 6C.	Middle Miocene.	20 osteoderms (IPB-HaH 3700), caudal vertebra (IPB-HaH 3709).	An anguid lizard.	
Anguidae	Anguidae indet. 2	Hambach 11.	Upper Pliocene.	2 caudal vertebrae (IPB-HaR 3009).	An anguid lizard.	
Bavarioboa	B. sp.	Hambach 6C.	Middle Miocene.	5 trunk vertebrae.	A boid snake.	
Chamaeleo	C. aff. andrusovi	Hambach 6C.	Middle Miocene.	Right squamosal (IPB-HaH 3900).	A chameleon.	
?Chamaeleonidae	Tooth morphotype 1.	Hambach 6C.	Middle Miocene.	Right maxilla (IPB-HaH 3901) & left maxilla (IPB-HaH 3902).	A chameleon.	
?Chamaeleonidae	Tooth morphotype 2.	Hambach 6C.	Middle Miocene.	Right maxilla (IPB-HaH 3903).	A chameleon.	
"Coluber"	"C." sp.	Hambach 6C.	Middle Miocene.	42 trunk vertebrae.	A colubrid snake.	
"Colubrinae"	"Colubrinae" indet. 1	Hambach 6C.	Middle Miocene.	57 trunk vertebrae.	A colubrine snake.	
"Colubrinae"	"Colubrinae" indet. 2	Hambach 11.	Upper Pliocene.	A trunk vertebra (IPB-HaR 3001).	A colubrine snake.	
Colubroidea	Colubroidea indet.	Hambach 6C.	Middle Miocene.	36 caudal vertebrae.	A colubroid snake.	
Eoanilius	E. sp.	Hambach 6C.	Middle Miocene.	5 trunk vertebrae.	An aniliid snake.	
cf. Falseryx	cf. F. sp.	Hambach 6C.	Middle Miocene.	A trunk vertebra (HaH-3830).	A tropidophiid snake.	
Lacertidae	Lacertidae indet. 1	Hambach 6C.	Middle Miocene.	Left maxilla (IPB-HaH 3701), two left dentaries (IPB-HaH 3702–3703).	A lacertid lizard.	
Lacertidae	Lacertidae indet. 2	Hambach 6C.	Middle Miocene.	Premaxilla (IPB-HaH3704), left dentary (IPB-HaH 3705).	A lacertid lizard.	
cf. Naja	cf. N. sp.	Hambach 6C.	Middle Miocene.	6 trunk vertebrae.	A cobra.	
"Natricinae"	Indeterminate	Hambach 6C.	Middle Miocene.	9 trunk vertebrae.	A natricine snake.	
Natrix	N. sp. 1	Hambach 6C.	Middle Miocene.	2 trunk vertebrae (IPB-HaH 3842; 3843).	A natricine snake.	
Natrix	N. sp. 2	Hambach.	Upper Pliocene.	4 trunk vertebrae (IPB-HaR 3010; 3401).	A natricine snake.	
Pseudopus	P. cf. ahnikoviensis	Hambach 6C.	Middle Miocene.	Right dentary (IPB-HaH3706), left dentary (IPB-HaH 3707).	A glass lizard, material likely represents a juvenile.	
Pseudopus	P. cf. pannonicus	Hambach 11 & 13.	Upper Pliocene.	Jaw elements.	A glass lizard.	
Pseudopus	P. sp. 1	Hambach 6C.	Middle Miocene.	Dorsal vertebra (IPB-HaH 3708).	A glass lizard.	
Pseudopus	P. sp. 2	Hambach 11 & 13.	Upper Pliocene.	Right nasal, vertebrae & osteoderms.	A glass lizard.	
Telescopus	T. sp.	Hambach 6C.	Middle Miocene.	A trunk vertebra (IPB-HaH 3853).	A colubrid snake.	
Texasophis	T. sp.	Hambach 6C.	Middle Miocene.	2 trunk vertebrae (IPB-HaH 3832; 3841).	A colubrid snake.	
Vipera	V. sp. ("Oriental viper")	Hambach 6C.	Middle Miocene.	8 trunk vertebrae.	A viper.	
Vipera	V. sp. ("aspis complex")	Hambach 6C.	Middle Miocene.	3 trunk vertebrae.	A viper.	

==== Testudines ====
Testudines reported from the Ville Formation
Genus	Species	Presence	Age	Material	Notes	Images
Carettochelyidae		Hambach 6C.	Middle Miocene.	A peripheral bone (IPB HaH 3028).	A carettochelyid turtle.	

=== Amphibians ===
Amphibians reported from the Ville Formation
Genus	Species	Presence	Age	Material	Notes	Images
Euronecturus	E. grogu	Hambach 6C.	Late Orleanian (early Middle Miocene).	Multiple specimens.	A proteid salamander.	

== See also ==
- List of fossiliferous stratigraphic units in Germany
