= Pseudopus rugosus =

Pseudopus rugosus Temporal range: Early Miocene

Scientific classification
- Domain: Eukaryota
- Kingdom: Animalia
- Phylum: Chordata
- Class: Reptilia
- Order: Squamata
- Family: Anguidae
- Genus: Pseudopus
- Species: †P. rugosus

Binomial name
- †Pseudopus rugosus Klembara, 2014

Extinct species of lizard

Pseudopus rugosus is an extinct species of Pseudopus that lived during the Early Miocene.

== Distribution ==
Pseudopus rugosus is known from northwestern Bohemia.
