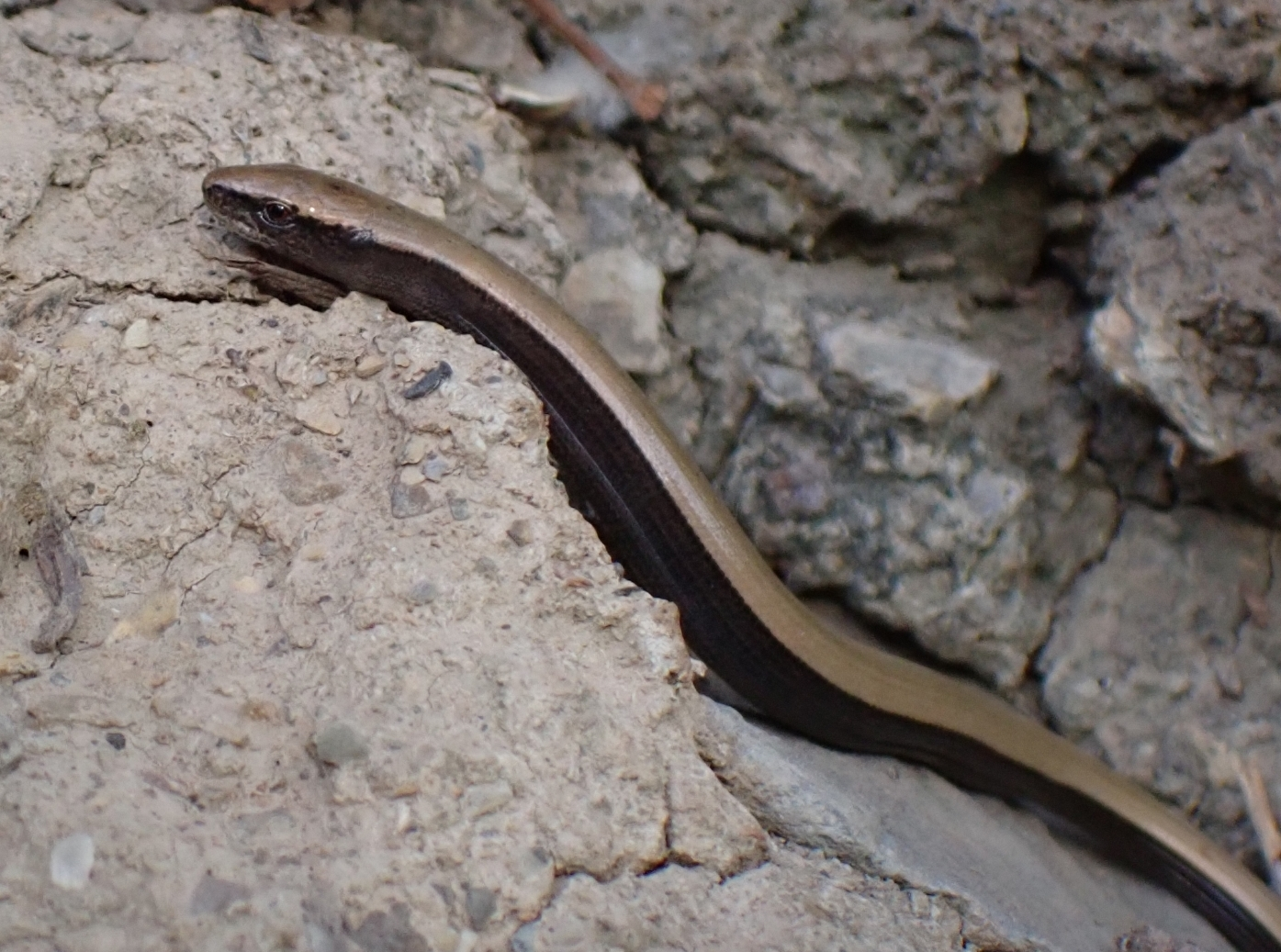

Conservation status
- Least Concern (IUCN 3.1)

Scientific classification
- Kingdom: Animalia
- Phylum: Chordata
- Class: Reptilia
- Order: Squamata
- Suborder: Anguimorpha
- Family: Anguidae
- Genus: Hyalosaurus; Günther, 1873
- Species: H. koellikeri

Binomial name
- Hyalosaurus koellikeri Günther, 1873
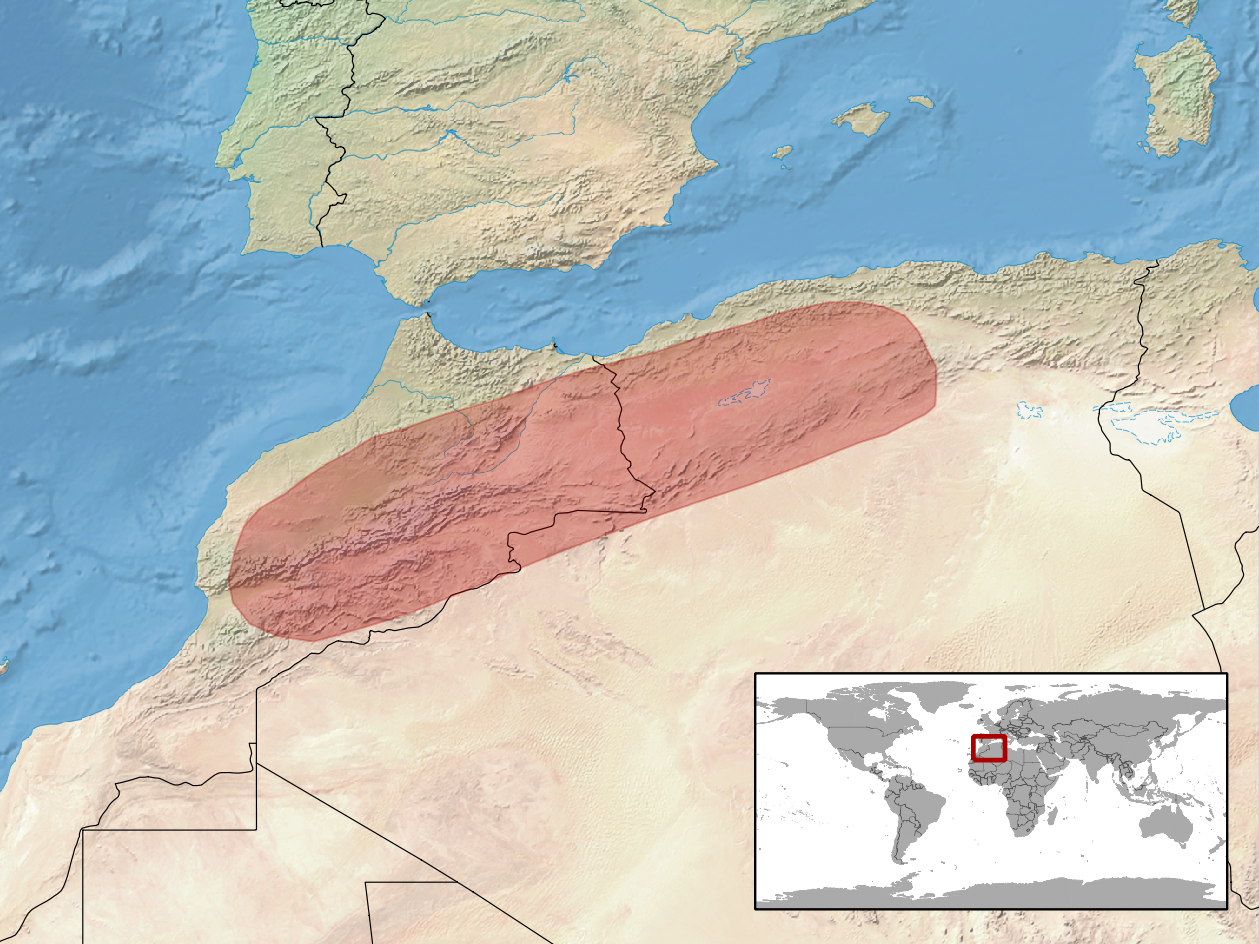

Synonyms
- Hyalosaurus koellikeri Günther, 1873; Pseudopus apus ornata Boettger, 1881; Ophisaurus koellikeri — Boulenger, 1885; Anguis koellikeri — Macey et al., 1999; Hyalosaurus koellikeri — Sindaco & Jeremčenko, 2008

= Koelliker's glass lizard =

Species of lizard

Koelliker's glass lizard (Hyalosaurus koellikeri), also called commonly the Moroccan glass lizard, is a species of lizard in the family Anguidae. The species is native to western North Africa.

== Etymology ==
The specific name, koellikeri, is in honor of Swiss histologist Albert von Kölliker.

== Geographic range ==
H. koellikeri is found in Algeria and Morocco.

== Habitat ==
The natural habitats of Koelliker's glass lizard are temperate forests, shrubland, temperate grassland, and pastureland, at altitudes up to 2,000 m (6,600 ft).

== Description ==
H. koellikeri has no fore limbs, but does have rudimentary hind limbs. Dorsally, it is brownish, with a darker lateral band. Ventrally, it is yellowish.

== Taxonomy ==
H. koellikeri has often been historically included within the genus Ophisaurus, but genetic evidence has shown H. koellikeri to be more closely related to Anguis and Pseudopus than to Ophisaurus.

== Reproduction ==
H. koellikeri is oviparous.

== Conservation status ==
H. koellikeri is threatened by habitat loss.
