= Pseudopus ahnikoviensis =

Pseudopus ahnikoviensis Temporal range: Burdigalian

Scientific classification
- Domain: Eukaryota
- Kingdom: Animalia
- Phylum: Chordata
- Class: Reptilia
- Order: Squamata
- Family: Anguidae
- Genus: Pseudopus
- Species: †P. ahnikoviensis

Binomial name
- †Pseudopus ahnikoviensis Klembara, 2012

Extinct species of lizard

Pseudopus ahnikoviensis is an extinct species of Pseudopus that lived during the Burdigalian stage of the Miocene epoch.

== Distribution ==
Pseudopus ahnikoviensis is known from fossils unearthed at the site of Merkur, a locality in northwestern Bohemia in Czechia.
