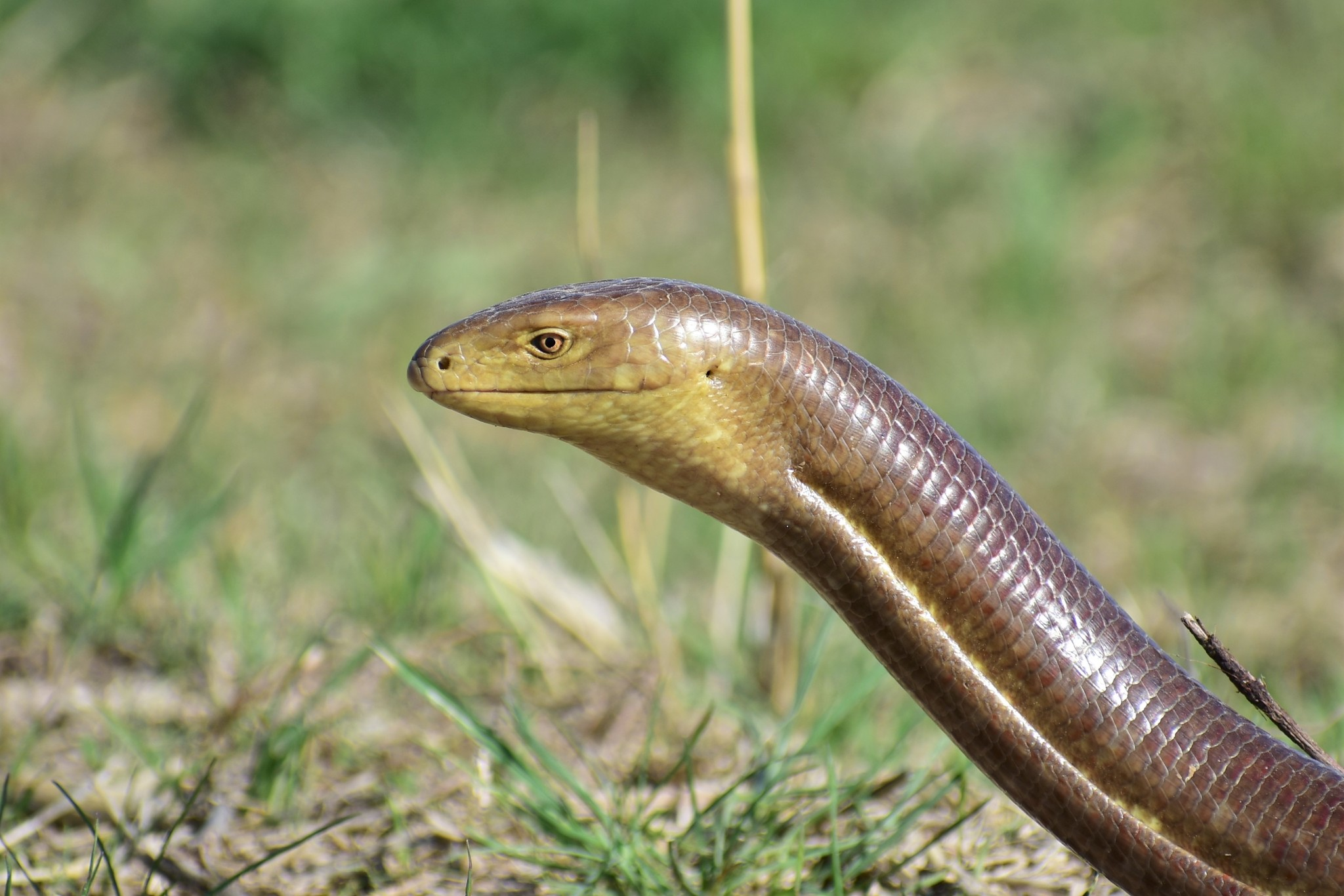

Conservation status
- Least Concern (IUCN 3.1)

Scientific classification
- Kingdom: Animalia
- Phylum: Chordata
- Class: Reptilia
- Order: Squamata
- Suborder: Anguimorpha
- Family: Anguidae
- Genus: Pseudopus
- Species: P. apodus

Binomial name
- Pseudopus apodus (Pallas, 1775)

Synonyms
- List: Lacerta apoda — Pallas, 1775; Pseudopus serpentinus — Merrem, 1820; Ophisaurus apus — Boulenger, 1885; Ophisaurus apodus — Mertens & L. Müller, 1928; Pseudopus apodus — Klembara, 1979

= Sheltopusik =

Species of lizard

The sheltopusik, also spelled scheltopusik, sheltopusick, scheltopusick, sheltopusic, or scheltopusic /ˌʃɛltəˈpjuːzɪk/ (Pseudopus apodus), and also commonly known as Pallas's glass lizard, the European legless lizard, or the European glass lizard, is a species of large glass lizard in the family Anguidae. The species is found from Southern Europe to Central Asia. There are three recognized subspecies.

== Taxonomy ==
The sheltopusik was previously included in the genus Ophisaurus, but has since been placed in its own genus Pseudopus, as Pseudopus apodus. It was originally described in 1775 by Peter Simon Pallas as Lacerta apoda.

== Subspecies ==
There are three subspecies that are recognized as being valid, including the nominotypical subspecies.

- Pseudopodus apodus apodus (Pallas, 1775) – the type subspecies, ranging from Crimea through Transcaucasia, east to Central Asia as far as Kazakhstan
- Pseudopodus apodus levantinus Jablonski, Ribeiro-Júnior, Meiri, Maza, Mikulíček & Jandzík, 2021 – restricted to the Levant, from southern Turkey south to Israel and Palestine
- Pseudopodus apodus thracius (Obst, 1978) – the westernmost subspecies, ranging from Croatia to Greece, east to western Turkey

Nota bene: A trinomial authority in parentheses indicates that the subspecies was originally described in a genus other than Pseudopus.

Despite only being described in 2021, P. a. levantinus is the largest and most genetically diverse of the subspecies, indicating an older and more complex evolutionary history compared to its sister subspecies.

== Etymology ==
The scientific name, Pseudopus apodus, comes from Greek ψευδοποδος άποδος, literally meaning "fake foot, no foot".

The common name "sheltopusik" comes from Russian желтопузик (zheltopuzik), which translates most directly as "yellow-bellied".

== Skull anatomy ==
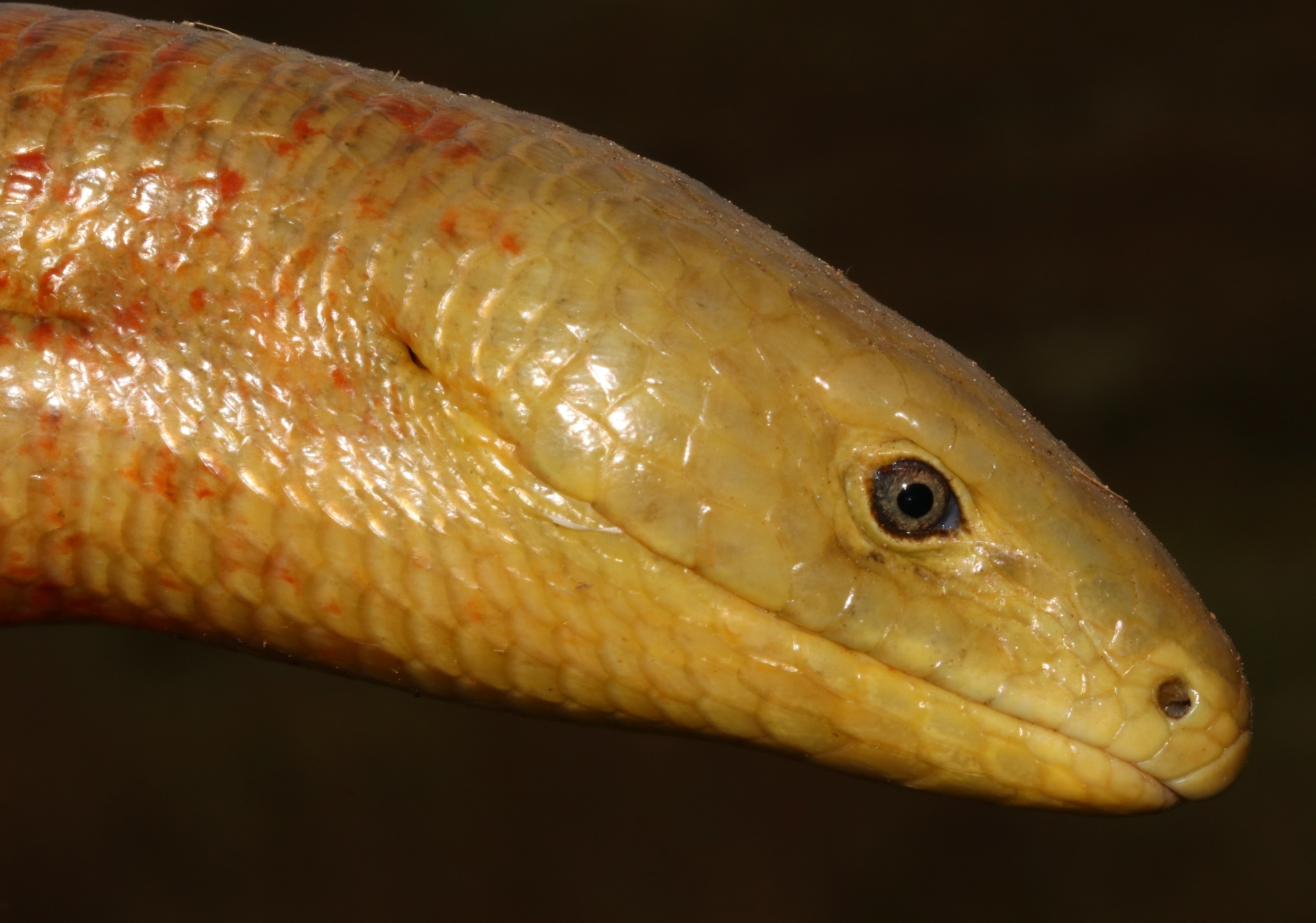
In Greece

The skull of Pseudopodus apodus is elongated, twice as long as it is wide and widest at the posteroventral portions of the jugals, where the cheeks proceed to narrow into the snout. The exonarial fenestra (external naris) is similarly elongated and elliptical. The orbits, which lie in a posterior portion of the anterior part of the skull, are large.

The premaxillary–maxilla has an elongated opening and has rounded ends. It is positioned between the forked premaxillary process of the maxilla and the maxillary and vomeromaxillary processes of the premaxilla.

== Description ==
The sheltopusik can reach a total length (tail included) of 135 cm (4.43 ft). It is tan-colored, paler on the ventral surface and the head, with a ring-like/segmented appearance that makes it look like a large earthworm, with a distinctive fold of skin down each side called a lateral groove. Small (2-mm) rear legs are sometimes visible near the cloaca. Though the legs are barely discernible, the sheltopusik can be quickly distinguished from a snake by its ears, eyelids, and lack of enlarged ventral scales. This species exhibits sexual dimorphism as males are on average larger than females.

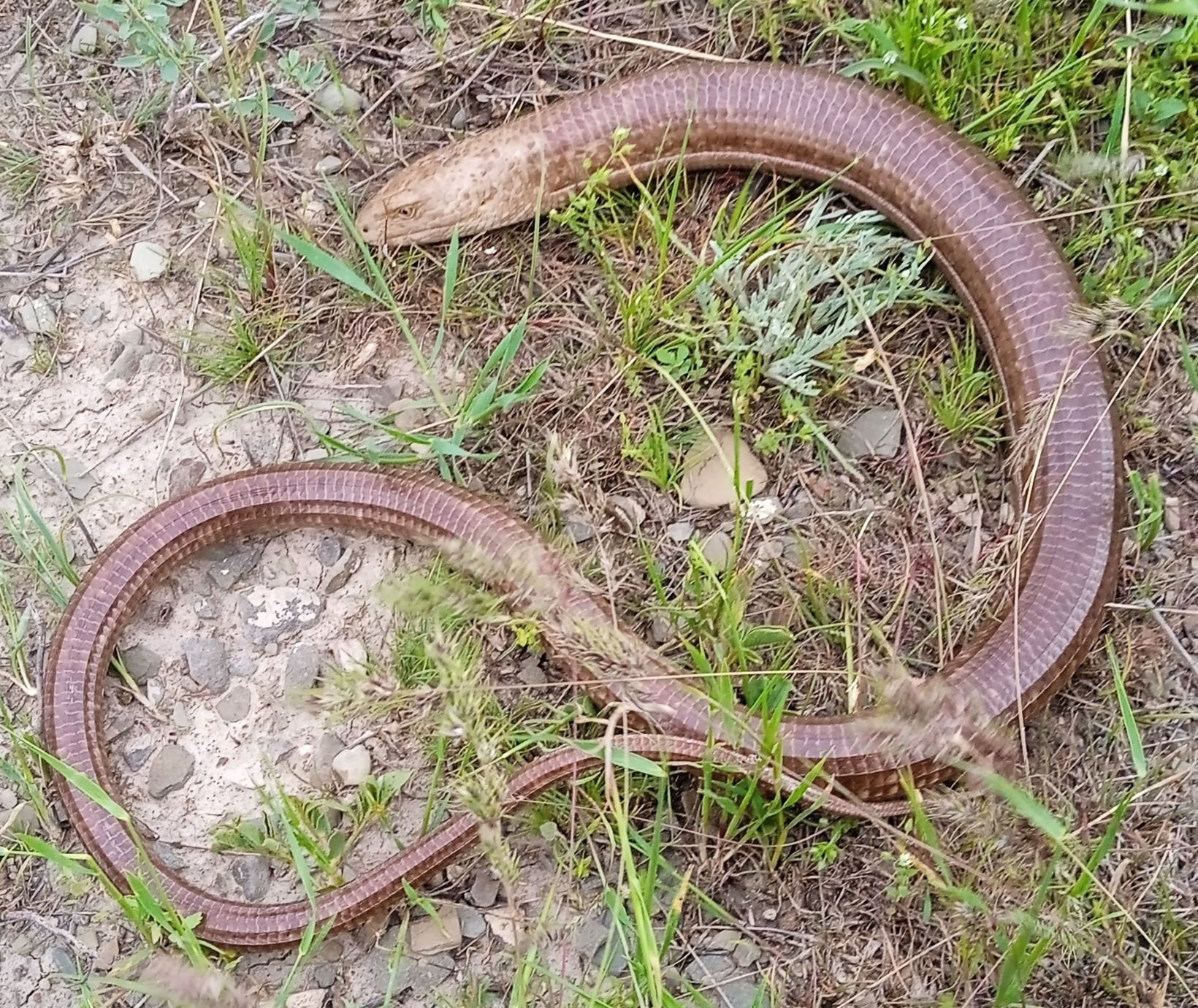
Adult

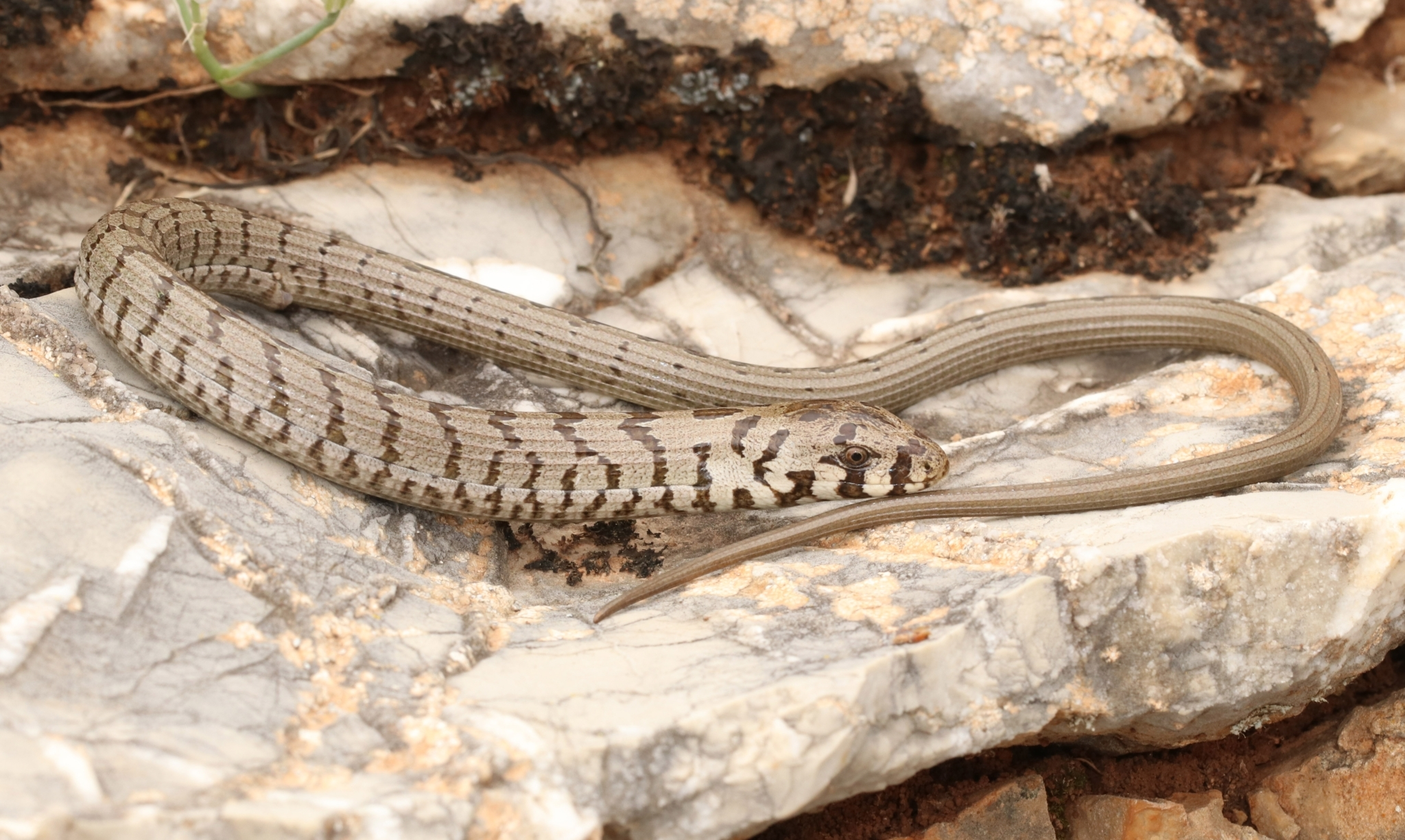
Juvenile

== Habitat and behaviour ==
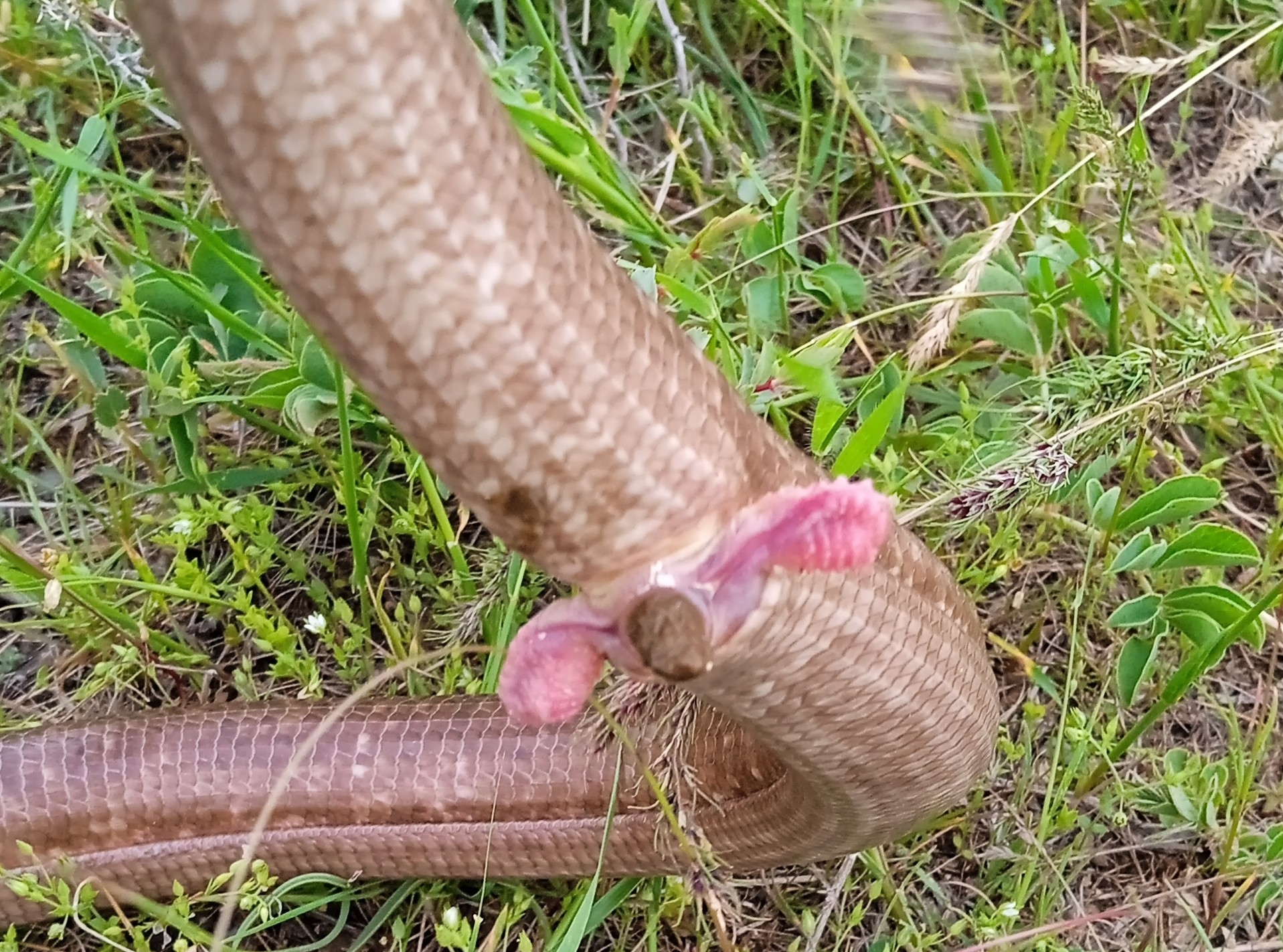
Musking

Pseudopodus apodus inhabits open country, such as short grassland or sparsely wooded hills. A preference for microhabitats that exhibit areas with sunlight and shade close together has been observed. It consumes arthropods and small mammals. Snails and slugs appear to be its favorite prey, which may explain why it is particularly active in wet weather, although it prefers a dry habitat. Breaking through the shells of snails is an especially easy task due to its teeth and jaw structure.

== Defensive behaviour ==
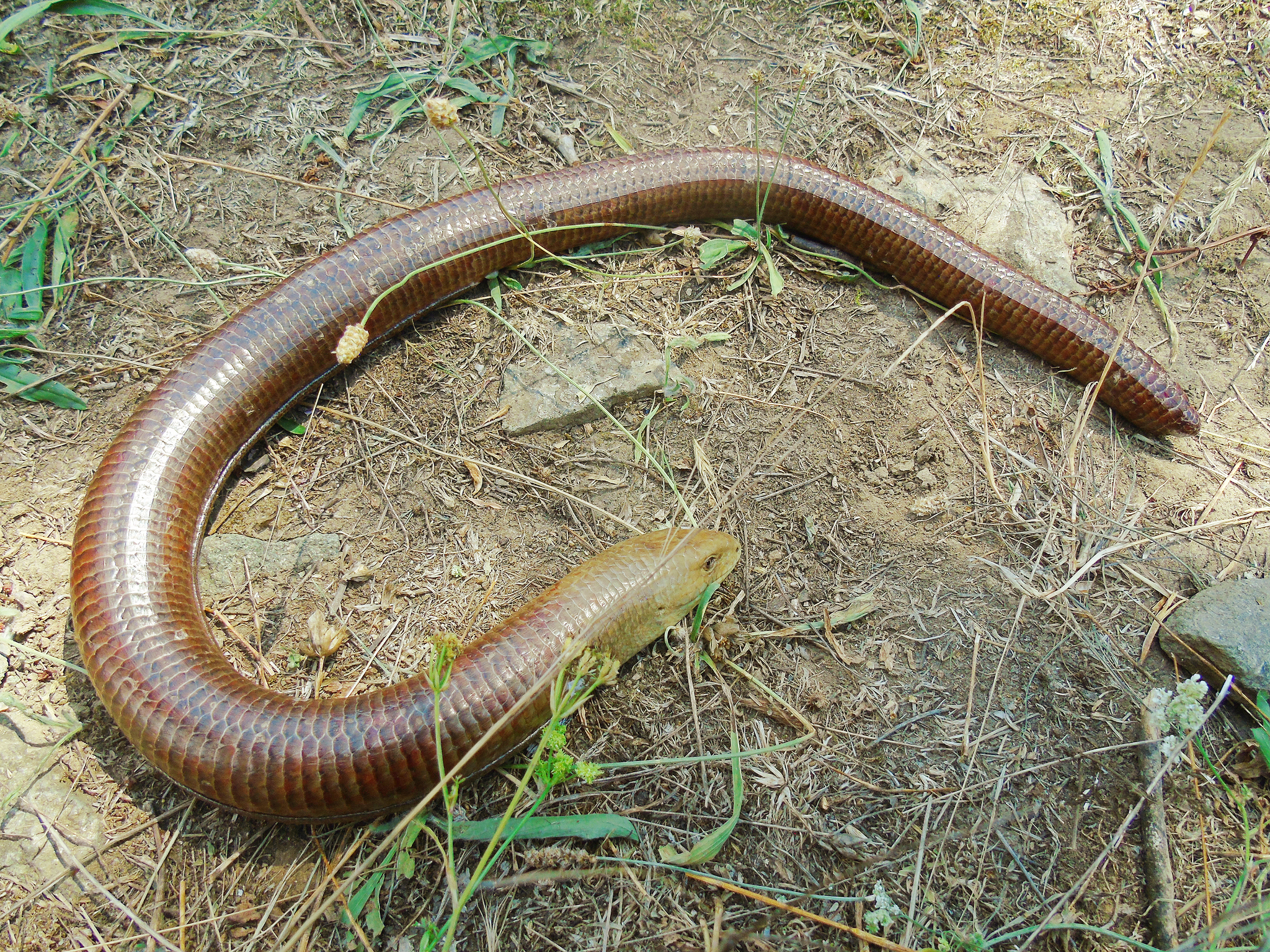
Shown here with a missing tail, the sheltopusik can autotomize its tail.

Due to its size, the sheltopusik tends to respond to harassment by hissing, biting, and musking. It is less likely to drop its tail than some other species that display caudal autotomy. However, these occasional displays of caudal autotomy are responsible for the name "glass lizard" (or "glass snake"). The released tail may break into pieces, leading to the myth that the lizard can shatter like glass and reassemble itself later. In reality, if the tail is lost, it grows back slowly, but is shorter and darker. The replacement tail may grow back to full length after an extended period of time.

== Reproduction ==
About 10 weeks after mating, the female Pseudopodus apodus lays about eight eggs, which she hides under bark or a stone, and often guards them. The young hatch after 45 to 55 days. They are typically about 15 cm (5.9 in) long and usually start to eat after four days.

== In captivity ==
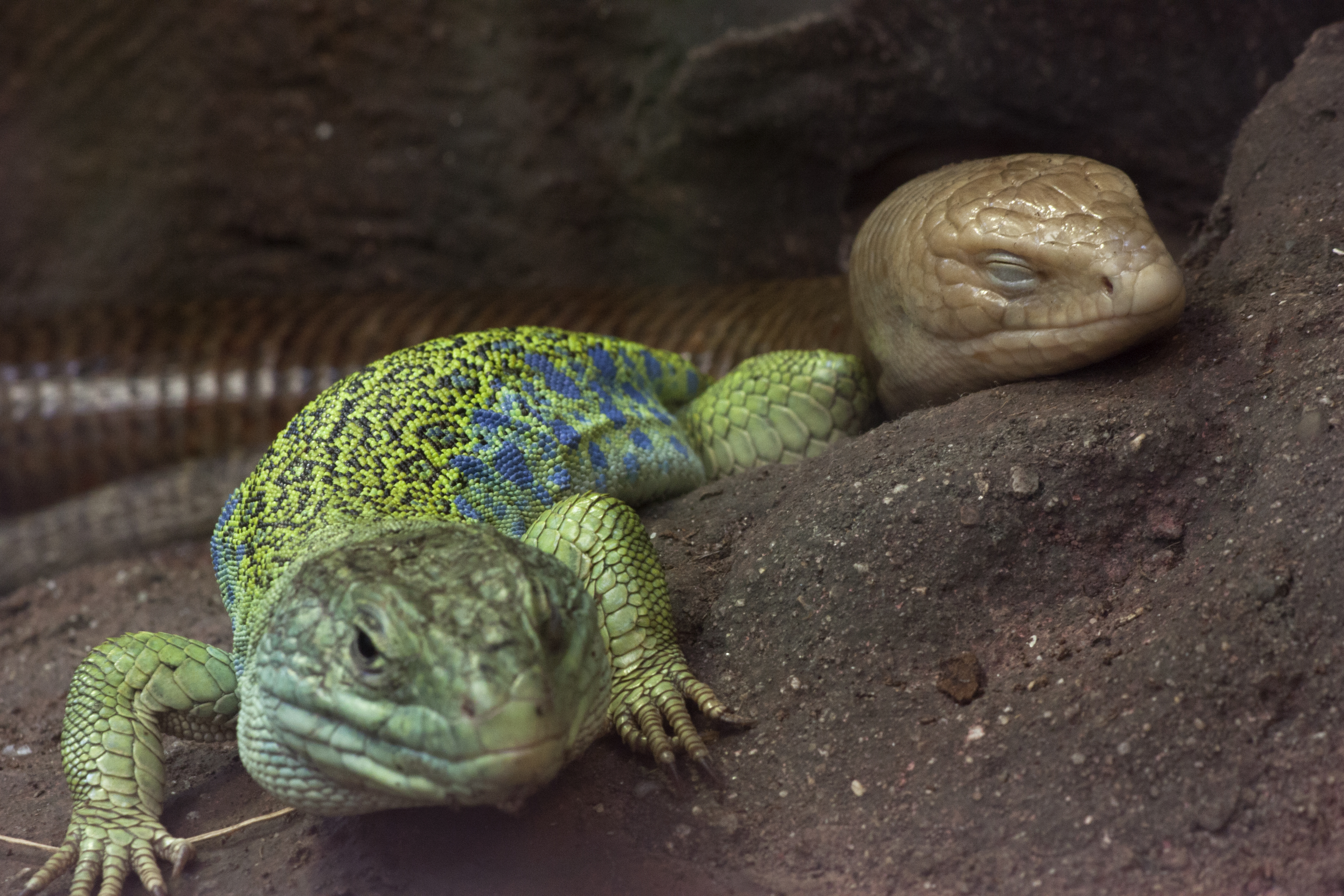
With an ocellated lizard at the Artis Royal Zoo

The sheltopusik is frequently available in the exotic pet trade, though rarely captive-bred. It does not typically tolerate a large amount of handling, but it adaptsto captivity well, feeding on crickets, meal worms, small mice, eggs, snails, or pieces of meat. It is even known to accept these meals from a keeper's tweezers or hand, once it becomes used to captivity. However, the sheltopusik does get excited around food, and it has surprisingly powerful jaws. It makes a hardy captives, capable of living up to 50 years.

== Relationship with humans ==
Remains of the Levant subspecies (Pseudopodus apodus levantinus) are known from Natufian sites in Israel, suggesting that it was eaten by the local population at the time.

== Gallery ==
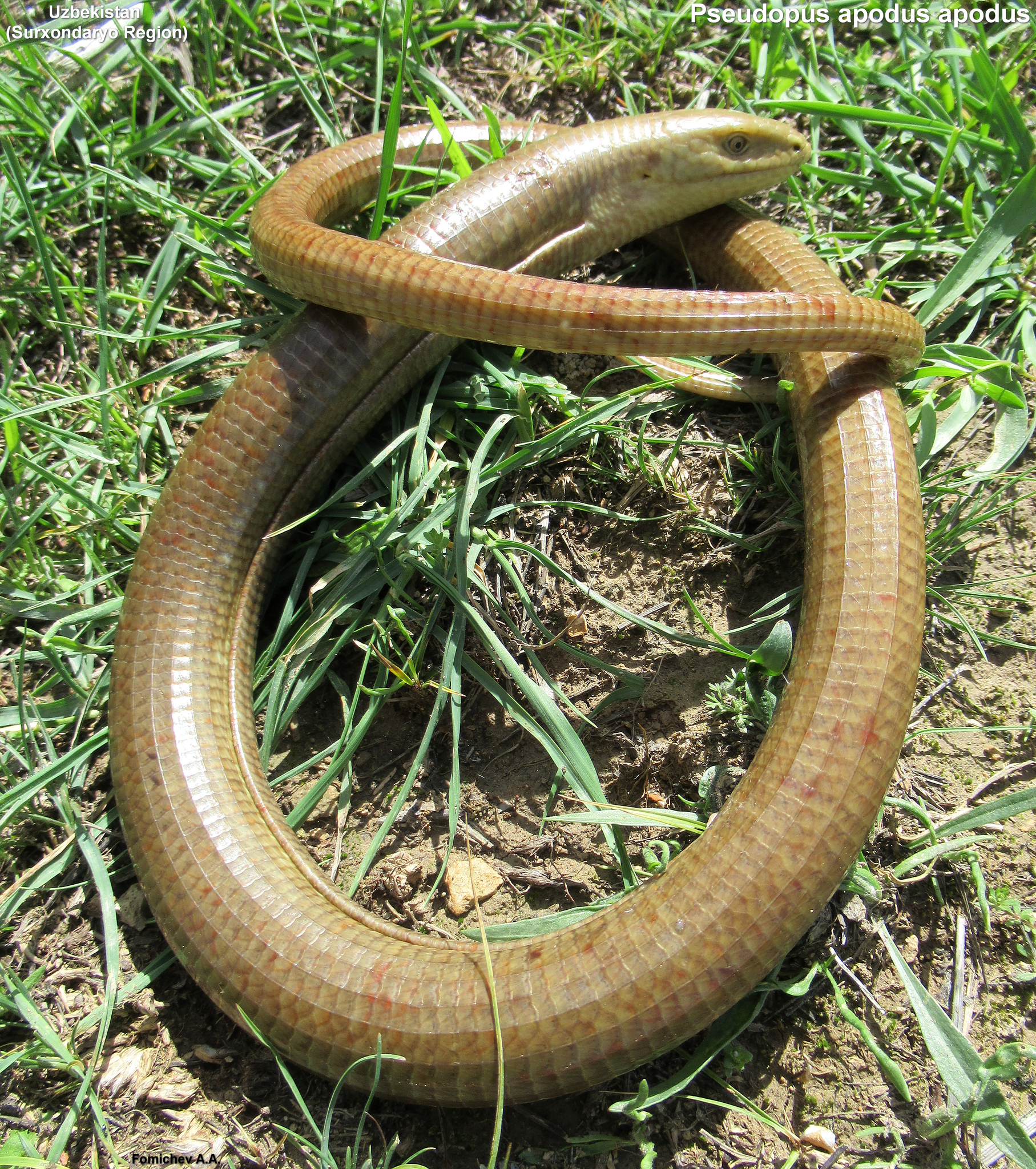
In Uzbekistan

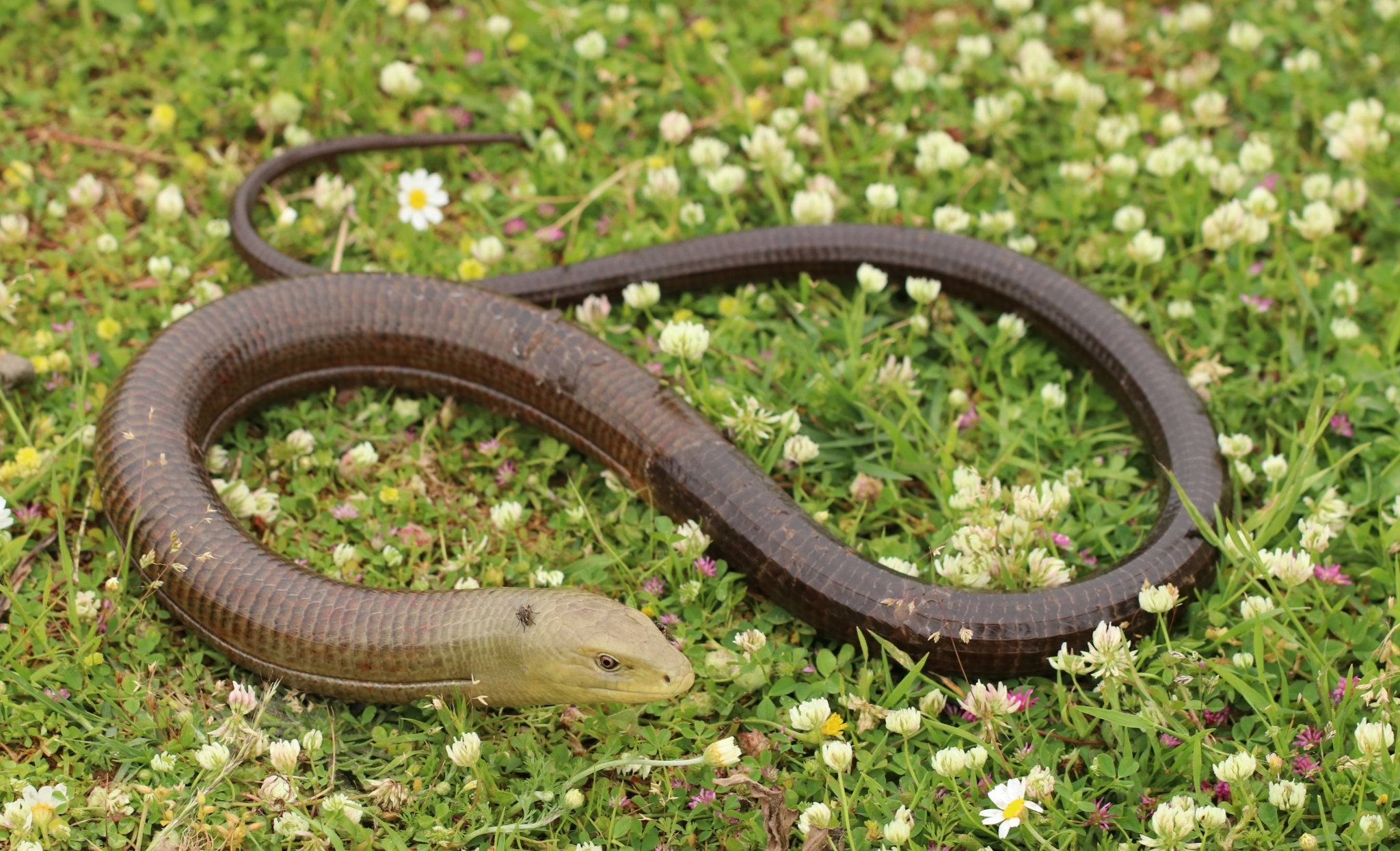
In Greece

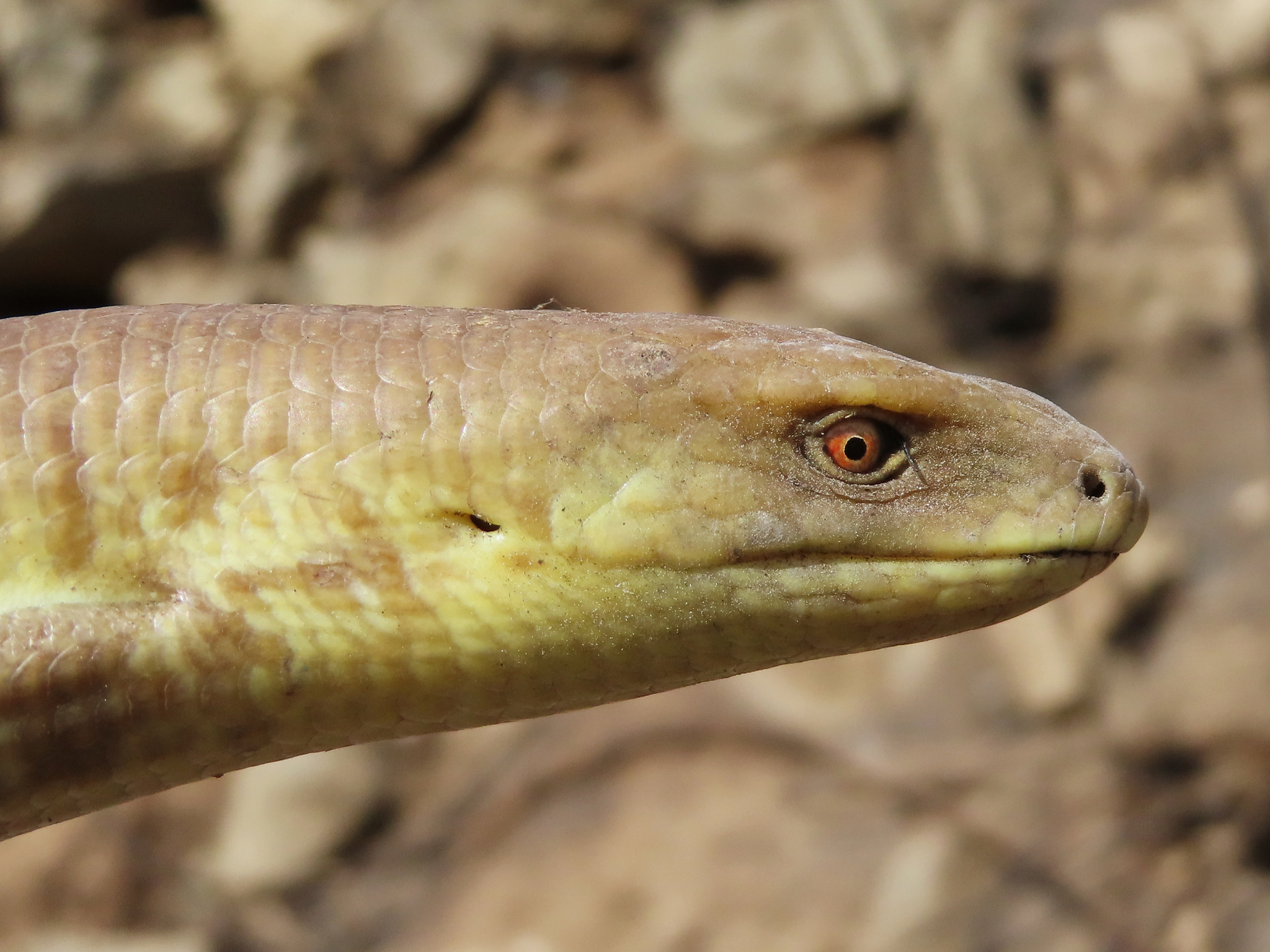
In Armenia

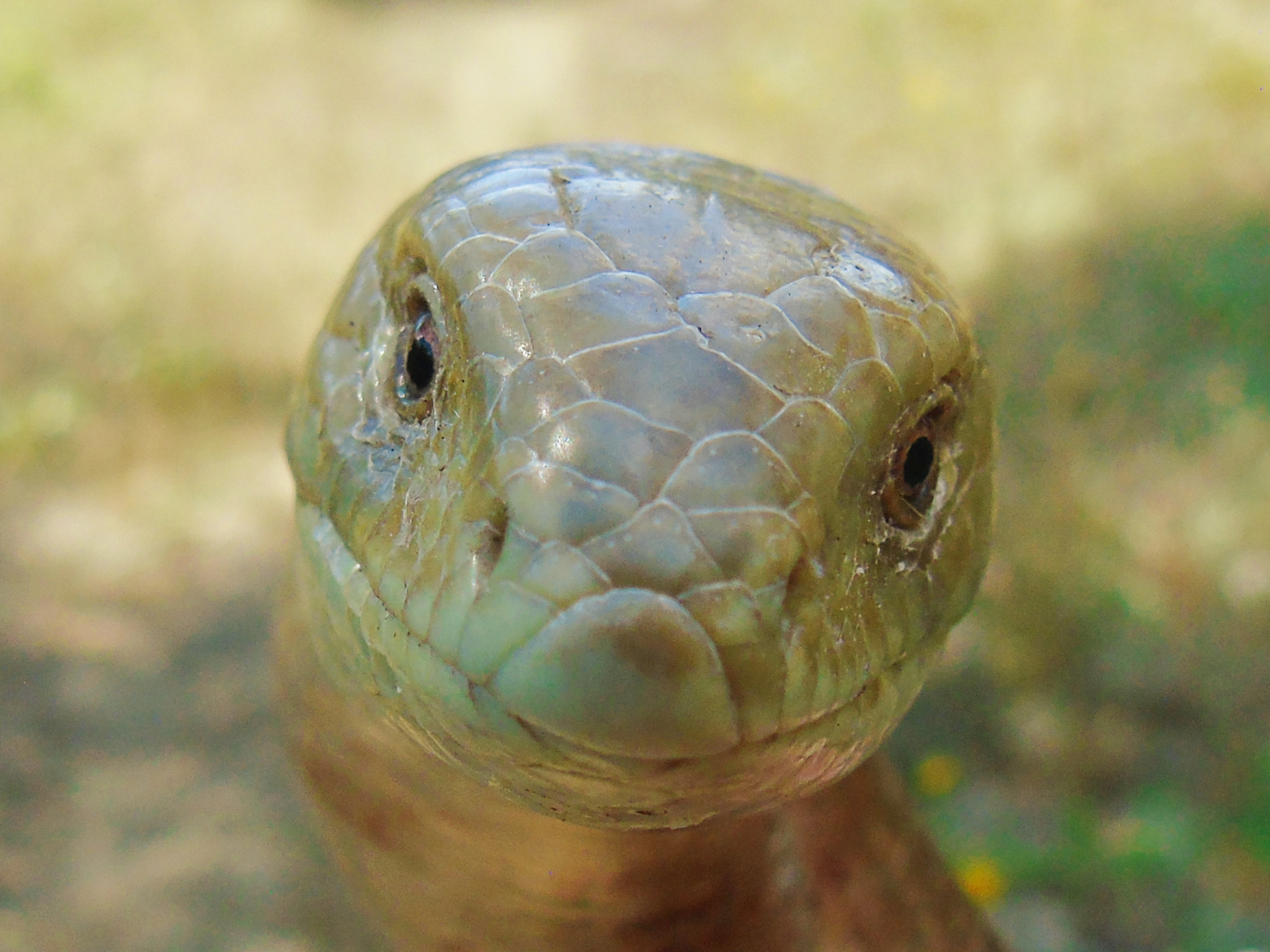
In Bulgaria

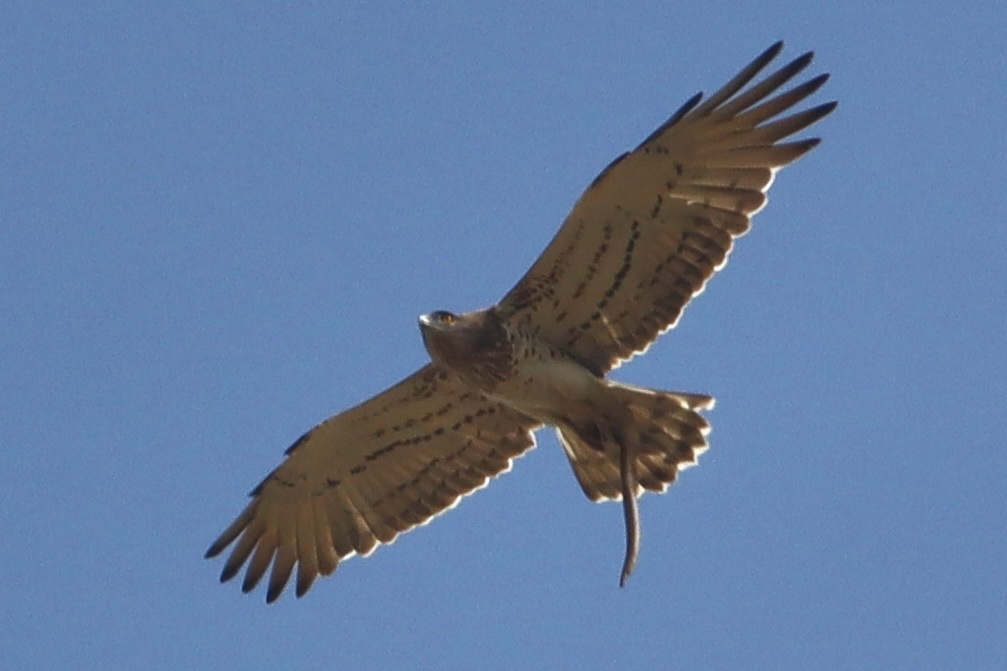
Caught by a short-toed snake eagle

Moving on a brick road
