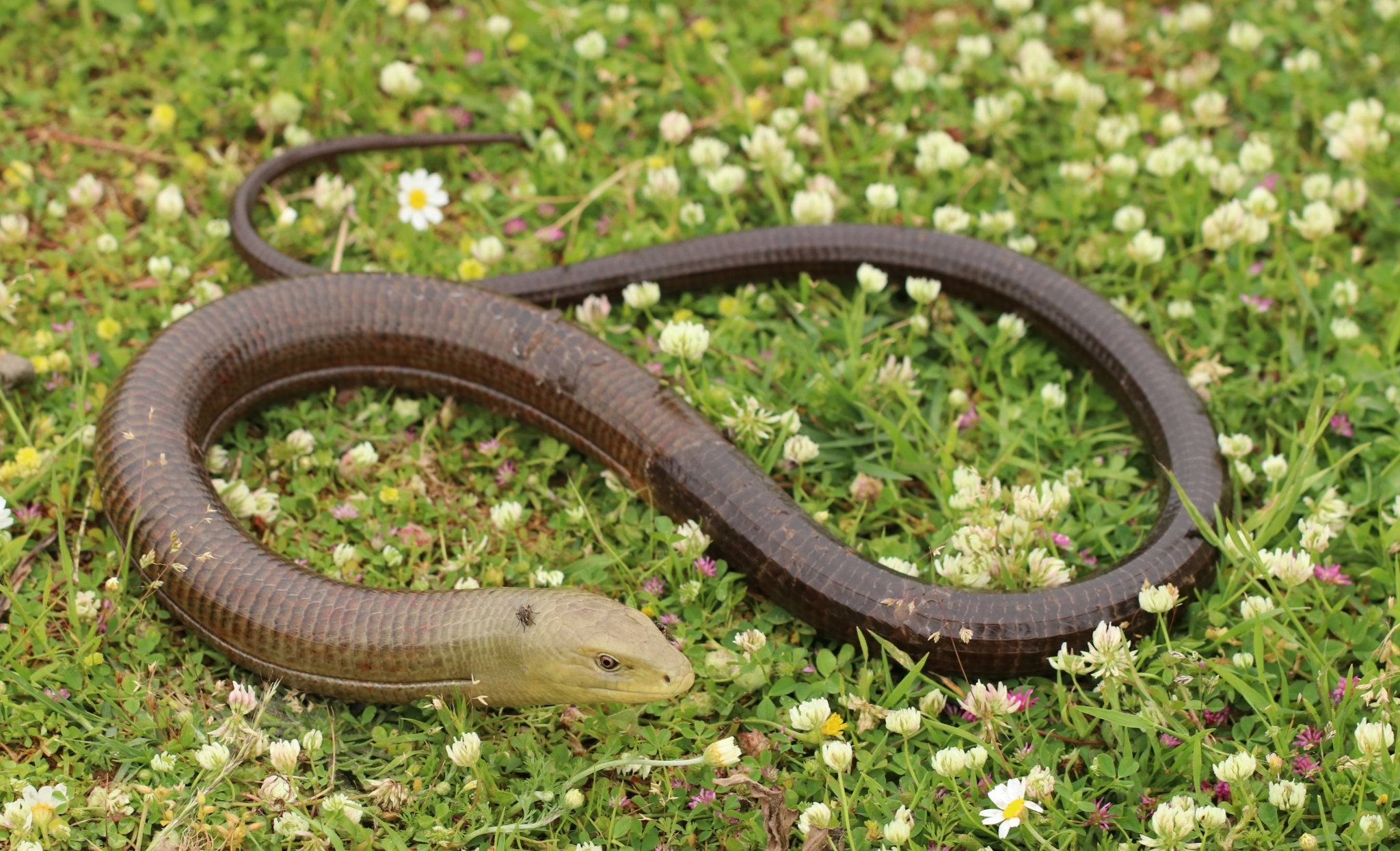

Scientific classification
- Domain: Eukaryota
- Kingdom: Animalia
- Phylum: Chordata
- Class: Reptilia
- Order: Squamata
- Family: Anguidae
- Subfamily: Anguinae
- Genus: Pseudopus; Merrem, 1820

Type species
- Lacerta apoda Pallas, 1775

= Pseudopus =

Pseudopus Temporal range: Early Miocene–Recent

Genus of lizards

Pseudopus is a genus of anguid lizards that are native to Eurasia. One extant species remains, the sheltopusik, with four fossil species. They are the most robust members of subfamily Anguinae, with the largest species †P. pannonicus growing up to 2 metres in length. The oldest fossils of the group date to the Early Miocene, but there are possible Oligocene records.

== Classification ==
Genus Pseudopus

- Pseudopus apodus (Pallas, 1775) – sheltopusik, Pallas's glass lizard, European legless lizard, European glass lizard
- †Pseudopus ahnikoviensis
- †Pseudopus laurillardi
- †Pseudopus pannonicus
- †Pseudopus rugosus
