= Bavarioboa =

Bavarioboa Temporal range: Oligocene-Miocene

Scientific classification
- Kingdom: Animalia
- Phylum: Chordata
- Class: Reptilia
- Order: Squamata
- Suborder: Serpentes
- Family: Boidae
- Genus: †Bavarioboa; Szyndlar and Schleich, 1993

Species
- Bavarioboa bachensis; Bavarioboa crocheti; Bavarioboa hermi; Bavarioboa herrlingensis; Bavarioboa minuta; Bavarioboa ultima; Bavarioboa vaylatsae; Bavarioboa wintershofensis

Bavarioboa is an extinct genus of boid that lived in Europe during the Oligocene and Miocene epochs.

== Distribution ==
Bavarioboa ultima is known from Early Miocene deposits in Germany. B. hermi has been found in Miocene deposits from both Germany and Czechia.
