= 2018 in reptile paleontology =

Paleontology or palaeontology is the study of prehistoric life forms on Earth through the examination of plant and animal fossils. This includes the study of body fossils, tracks (ichnites), burrows, cast-off parts, fossilised feces (coprolites), palynomorphs and chemical residues. Because humans have encountered fossils for millennia, paleontology has a long history both before and after becoming formalized as a science. This article records significant discoveries and events related to paleontology that occurred or were published in the year 2018.

== Lizards and snakes ==
=== Research ===
- Triassic reptile Megachirella wachtleri is reinterpreted as the oldest known stem-squamate by Simões et al. (2018).
- Simões et al. (2018) perform X-ray scans at the micron scale of the holotype specimen of Megachirella wachtleri.
- Fossil trackways probably made by lizards running bipedally are described from the Lower Cretaceous (Aptian-early Albian) Hasandong Formation (South Korea) by Lee et al. (2018), who name a new ichnotaxon Sauripes hadongensis.
- New fossil material of Dicothodon bajaensis, providing new information on the tooth replacement pattern in this species, is described from the Campanian of Mexico by Chavarría-Arellano, Simões and Montellano-Ballesteros (2018).
- A study on the manus of a putative stem-gekkotan from the Cretaceous amber from Myanmar is published by Fontanarrosa, Daza and Abdala (2018), who report the presence of adaptations to climbing, including adhesive structures.
- A maxilla of a gekkotan of uncertain phylogenetic placement is described from the Late Oligocene Nsungwe Formation (Tanzania) by Müller et al. (2018), representing the second record of a Paleogene gekkotan from Africa and the first one from the central part of the continent.
- A gekkotan specimen from the collection of the Alexander Koenig Research Museum, originally interpreted as a member of the genus Sphaerodactylus preserved in Dominican amber, is reinterpreted as a specimen belonging to the species Ebenavia boettgeri and as preserved in copal from Madagascar by Daza et al. (2018).
- A study on differences in the anatomy of the skeletons of the turnip-tailed gecko (Thecadactylus rapicauda) and the tropical house gecko (Hemidactylus mabouia), and on the specific identification of gekkotan subfossil remains from the Pointe Gros Rempart 6 Hole (La Désirade island), is published by Bochaton, Daza and Lenoble (2018).
- A revision of the lizard fossils from the Upper Cretaceous of Mongolia and China which were originally assigned to the genus Bainguis is published by Dong et al. (2018), who transfer some of this fossil material to the stem-scincoid genus Parmeosaurus.
- New specimen of the Late Jurassic lizard Ardeosaurus brevipes is described from the Solnhofen area (Germany) by Tałanda (2018), who interprets this species as a probable member of the crown group of Scincoidea.
- Description of putative cordylid fossils from the Miocene of Germany, originally assigned to the taxon informally known as "Bavaricordylus", and a study on their taxonomic status is published by Villa et al. (2018), who reinterpret these fossils as more likely to represent the lacertid genus Janosikia.
- Fossils of a member of the genus Timon are described from the Pleistocene of Monte Tuttavista (Sardinia, Italy) by Tschopp et al. (2018), representing the first reported fossil occurrence of this genus from Sardinia.
- Description of fossils of amphisbaenians and anguimorph lizards from the late Miocene Solnechnodolsk locality (southern European Russia) is published online by Černanský, Syromyatnikova and Jablonski (2018).
- A dentary of an amphisbaenian belonging or related to the species Blanus strauchi is described from the middle Miocene locality of Gebeceler (Turkey) by Georgalis et al. (2018), representing the first fossil find of a member of the Blanus strauchi species complex and the sole confirmed fossil occurrence of the genus Blanus in the eastern Mediterranean region reported so far.
- Amphisbaenian vertebral material is described from the Pliocene of northern Greece by Georgalis, Villa and Delfino (2018), representing the youngest occurrence of amphisbaenians in continental Eastern Europe reported so far.
- Description of temujiniid frontals from the Aptian–Albian of the Khobur vertebrate locality (Mongolia) and a study on the placement of Temujiniidae in the phylogenetic tree of Iguanomorpha is published by Alifanov (2018).
- A study aiming to predict past (late Quaternary), current, and future habitat ranges for lizards belonging to the genus Pogona is published by Rej and Joyner (2018).
- A premaxilla of a member of the genus Elgaria is described from the Miocene Split Rock Formation (Wyoming, United States) by Scarpetta (2018), representing the oldest known fossil of a member of this genus reported so far.
- Two specimens assigned to the species Saniwa ensidens, preserving an accessory foramen in the skull indicative of the presence of fourth eye, are described from the Eocene Bridger Formation (Wyoming, United States) by Smith et al. (2018).
- Fossil vertebrae of varanid lizards are described from the early Miocene Loire Basin (France) by Augé and Guével (2018).
- Redescription of the morphology of the type material of Varanus marathonensis from the late Miocene of Pikermi (Greece) and description of new fossils of this species from Spain is published by Villa et al. (2018), who consider the species V. amnhophilis to be likely junior synonym of V. marathonensis.
- A basal mosasauroid specimen including a rib and a vertebra, representing a larger individual than the holotype of Phosphorosaurus ponpetelegans and predating P. ponpetelegans by approximately 10 million years, is reported from the Upper Cretaceous (lower Campanian) of Hokkaido (Japan) by Sato et al. (2018).
- Description of a Campanian mosasaur assemblage from the Hannover region of northern Germany is published by Hornung, Reich and Frerichs (2018), who confirm the presence of the genus Clidastes in northern central Europe, as well as the early Transatlantic distribution of a basal member of the genus Prognathodon during the lower Campanian.
- Description of two skulls of subadult specimens of Tylosaurus proriger from the Niobrara Formation (Kansas, United States), and a study on the allometric changes undergone by T. proriger through life, is published by Stewart and Mallon (2018), who reject the hypothesis presented by Jiménez-Huidobro, Simões and Caldwell (2016) that Tylosaurus kansasensis is a junior synonym of Tylosaurus nepaeolicus.
- The smallest-known, neonate-sized specimen of Tylosaurus is described from the Santonian portion of the Niobrara Chalk (Kansas, United States) by Konishi, Jiménez-Huidobro and Caldwell (2018).
- A study on the evolution of the skull shape in snakes and on its implications for inferring the ancestral ecology of snakes is published by Da Silva et al. (2018).
- New method of evaluating the age of fossil snake specimens at the time of death is proposed by Petermann and Gauthier (2018), who also test whether their method can be used to identify isolated fossil remains of the Eocene snake Boavus occidentalis from the Willwood Formation (Wyoming, United States) at the level of individual organisms.
- Digital endocasts of the inner ears of the madtsoiid snakes Yurlunggur and Wonambi are reconstructed by Palci et al. (2018), who also study the implications of the inner ear morphology of these taxa for inferring their ecology.
- A natural cast of the posterior brain, skull vessels and nerves, and the inner ear of Dinilysia patagonica is described by Triviño et al. (2018).
- A study on the phylogenetic relationships of the Miocene snake Pseudoepicrates stanolseni is published by Onary and Hsiou (2018), who transfer this species to the boid genus Chilabothrus.
- Description of snake fossils from the Pliocene/Pleistocene El Breal de Orocual locality and from the late Pleistocene Mene de Inciarte locality (Venezuela) is published by Onary, Rincón and Hsiou (2018).
- Inflammatory arthritis is documented for the first time in snakes, including the aquatic Cretaceous snake Lunaophis aquaticus, by Albino et al. (2018).
- Revision of lizard and snake fossils from the Pliocene site of Kanapoi (Kenya) is published online by Head and Müller (2018).

=== New taxa ===
Name	Novelty	Status	Authors	Age	Type locality	Country	Notes	Images
Amananulam	Gen. et sp. nov	Valid	McCartney et al.	Paleocene		Mali	A snake belonging to the family Nigerophiidae. The type species is A. sanogoi.	
Amaru	Gen. et sp. nov	Valid	Albino	Early Eocene	Lumbrera Formation	Argentina	A macrostomatan snake. Genus includes new species A. scagliai.	
Anguis rarus	Sp. nov	Valid	Klembara & Rummel	Early Miocene		Germany	A slow worm.	
Barlochersaurus	Gen. et sp. nov	Valid	Daza et al.	Late Cretaceous (Cenomanian)	Burmese amber	Myanmar	Probable member of Anguimorpha of uncertain phylogentic placement. The type species is B. winhtini.	
Bicuspidon hogreli	Sp. nov	Valid	Vullo & Rage	Late Cretaceous (Cenomanian)	Kem Kem Beds	Morocco	A polyglyphanodontid lizard	
Boa blanchardensis	Sp. nov	Valid	Bochaton & Bailon	Late Pleistocene		France (Marie-Galante Island)	A species of Boa.	
Callopistes rionegrensis	Sp. nov	Valid	Quadros, Chafrat & Zaher	Early Miocene	Chichinales Formation	Argentina	A teiid lizard, a species of Callopistes.	
Euleptes klembarai	Sp. nov	Valid	Čerňanský, Daza & Bauer	Miocene (Astaracian)		Slovakia	A relative of the European leaf-toed gecko.	
Primitivus	Gen. et sp. nov	Valid	Paparella et al.	Late Cretaceous (late Campanian–early Maastrichtian)		Italy	A member of the family Dolichosauridae. The type species is P. manduriensis.	
Stenoplacosaurus	Gen. et comb. nov	Valid	Sullivan & Dong	Middle Eocene (Sharamurunian)	Heti Formation; Shara Murun Formation	China	An anguid lizard belonging to the subfamily Glyptosaurinae. The type species is "Helodermoides" mongoliensis Sullivan (1979).	
Tsagansaurus	Gen. et sp. nov	Valid	Alifanov	Late Paleocene		Mongolia	A platynotan lizard belonging to the family Parasaniwidae. The type species is T. nemegetensis.	
Tylosaurus saskatchewanensis	Sp. nov	Valid	Jiménez-Huidobro et al.	Late Cretaceous (late Campanian)	Bearpaw Formation	Canada (Saskatchewan)	A mosasaur	
Xiaophis	Gen. et sp. nov		Xing et al.	Late Cretaceous (Cenomanian)	Burmese amber	Myanmar	A snake described on the basis of a fossilized embryo or neonate. The type species is X. myanmarensis.	

== Ichthyosauromorphs ==
- A study aiming to identify sexual dimorphism, taxonomic variation and individual variation among the specimens of Chaohusaurus chaoxianensis is published by Motani et al. (2018).
- A survey of the form and distribution of pathological structures in the skeletons of ichthyosaurs is published by Pardo-Pérez et al. (2018).
- A study on the microanatomy of vertebral centra of ichthyosaurs, aiming to establish whether there is any variation between the primitive and the most derived forms, is published by Houssaye, Nakajima & Sander (2018).
- Humeri of Pessopteryx nisseri and vertebrae referred to the genus Cymbospondylus are described from the Lower Triassic Vikinghøgda Formation (Spitsbergen, Norway) by Engelschiøn et al. (2018).
- A large, isolated jaw fragment of a giant ichthyosaur is described from the Upper Triassic (Rhaetian) Westbury Mudstone Formation (United Kingdom) by Lomax et al. (2018), who also reinterpret some putative dinosaur limb bone shafts from the Upper Triassic of Aust Cliff as more likely to be ichthyosaur fossils.
- Ichthyosaur fossils, including an incomplete skeleton of a member of the genus Leptonectes, are described from the Lower Jurassic (Pliensbachian) of Asturias (Spain) by Fernández, Piñuela & García-Ramos (2018).
- Remains of ichthyosaur embryos, still situated within a fragment of the rib-cage of the parent animal, are described from the Lower Jurassic (Toarcian) Whitby Mudstone Formation (United Kingdom) by Boyd & Lomax (2018).
- Ichthyosaur remains from the Lower Cretaceous Agrio Formation (Neuquén Basin, Argentina) are described by Lazo et al. (2018).
- New specimen of Phalarodon fraasi is described from the Middle Triassic Botneheia Formation (Svalbard, Norway) by Økland et al. (2018).
- Redescription of the relocated holotype of Suevoleviathan integer is published by Maxwell (2018), who considers the species Suevoleviathan disinteger to be a junior synonym of S. integer.
- A study on specimens of Temnodontosaurus from the Early Jurassic of southern Germany, aiming to document the types of pathologies observed in the skeletons of specimens assigned to this genus, is published by Pardo-Pérez et al. (2018).
- Four isolated partial skulls from the Lower Jurassic of the United Kingdom, previously identified as Ichthyosaurus communis, are assigned to the species Protoichthyosaurus prostaxalis and P. applebyi by Lomax & Massare (2018), providing new information on the anatomy of these taxa.
- A reassessment of Ichthyosaurus communis and I. intermedius is published by Massare & Lomax (2018), who consider the latter species to be a junior synonym of the former.
- A study on the cellular and molecular composition of integumental tissues in an exceptionally preserved specimen of Stenopterygius is published by Lindgren et al. (2018).
- A study on the anatomy of an ophthalmosaurid rostrum fragment from the Upper Jurassic (Oxfordian) in the Morawica quarry in the Świętokrzyskie Mountains (Poland), and on its implications for reconstructing the internal morphology of the ophthalmosaurid cranial region and inferring the functional adaptations and palaeoecology of these reptiles, is published online by Tyborowski, Skrzycki & Dec (2018).
- New specimen of Palvennia hoybergeti, providing new information on the anatomy of this species, is described from the Upper Jurassic Slottsmøya Member of the Agardhfjellet Formation (Spitsbergen, Norway) by Delsett et al. (2018).
- A revision of British ichthyosaur taxa of the Late Jurassic is published by Moon & Kirton (2018).

== Sauropterygians ==
=== Research ===
- A study aiming to estimate metabolic rates and bone growth rates in eosauropterygians, especially in plesiosaurs, is published by Fleischle, Wintrich & Sander (2018).
- A study on the histology and life history of the Middle Triassic pachypleurosaurs: Dactylosaurus from the early Anisian of Poland and aff. Neusticosaurus pusillus from the early Ladinian of southern Germany is published by Klein & Griebeler (2018).
- Periosteal reaction to a tuberculosis-like respiratory infection affecting ribs of the holotype specimen of "Proneusticosaurus" silesiacus is reported by Surmik et al. (2018).
- A study on the variability of the skull morphology in Simosaurus gaillardoti is published by de Miguel Chaves, Ortega & Pérez-García (2018).
- A study on the internal anatomy of the skull of Nothosaurus marchicus is published by Voeten et al. (2018).
- An incomplete mandible of a large-bodied predatory plesiosaur is described from the Lower Cretaceous (Barremian) Deister Formation (Germany) by Sachs et al. (2018).
- The first Jurassic plesiosaur from Antarctica is described from the Upper Jurassic Ameghino (= Nordensköld) Formation (Antarctic Peninsula) by O'Gorman et al. (2018).
- Morphologically diverse pliosaurid teeth are described from the Upper Jurassic (Tithonian) of the Kheta river basin (Eastern Siberia, Russia) and from the Lower Cretaceous (Berriasian and Valanginian) of the Volga region (European Russia) by Zverkov et al. (2018), who argue that their findings challenge the hypothesis that only one lineage of pliosaurids crossed the Jurassic–Cretaceous boundary.
- Complete mandible of Kronosaurus queenslandicus is described from the Albian Allaru Mudstone (Australia) by Holland (2018).
- Description of the skull bones of Abyssosaurus nataliae from the Cretaceous (Hauterivian) of Chuvashia (Russia) is published by Berezin (2018), who also revises the species diagnosis.
- A study on a specimen of Cryptoclidus eurymerus from the Middle Jurassic (Callovian) of Peterborough (United Kingdom), with the left forelimb injured by a predator causing the loss of use of this limb but which nevertheless survived for some time after that injury, is published by Rothschild, Clark & Clark (2018), who also evaluate the implications of this specimen for the various hypotheses on plesiosaur propulsion.
- A study on the range of motion of the neck of an exceptionally preserved specimen of Nichollssaura borealis is published by Nagesan, Henderson & Anderson (2018).
- A study on the morphology of Thililua longicollis and on the phylogenetic relationships of members of the family Polycotylidae is published by Fischer et al. (2018), who name a new clade Occultonectia.
- Two new plesiosaur specimens, including a specimen of the species Libonectes morgani (otherwise known from North American fossils), are described from the Upper Cretaceous (Turonian) deposits of Goulmima (Morocco) by Allemand et al. (2018).
- Description of a skull and partial postcranial skeleton of a juvenile elasmosaurid from the Upper Cretaceous Tahora Formation (New Zealand), referred to the species Tuarangisaurus keyesi, is published by Otero et al. (2018).
- An exceptionally well-preserved elasmosaurid basicranium, providing new information on the anatomy of the skull of elasmosaurids, is described from the Upper Cretaceous (lower Campanian) Rybushka Formation (Russia) by Zverkov, Averianov & Popov (2018).
- Redescription of Aristonectes quiriquinensis, providing new information on the anatomy of this species, is published by Otero, Soto-Acuña & O'keefe (2018).
- Cranial material of a non-aristonectine elasmosaurid plesiosaur is described from the Upper Cretaceous (Maastrichtian) Cape Lamb Member of the Snow Hill Island Formation (Vega Island, Antarctica) by O'Gorman et al. (2018).
- New elasmosaurid specimen is described from the upper Maatrichtian horizons of the López de Bertodano Formation (Antarctica) by O'Gorman et al. (2018), representing one of the youngest non-aristonectine weddellonectian elasmosaurid specimens from Antarctica reported so far, documenting the presence of at least two different non-aristonectine elasmosaurids in Antarctica during the late Maastrichtian, and confirming the coexistence of aristonectine and non-aristonectine elasmosaurids in Antarctica until the end of the Cretaceous.
- Redescription of the holotype of Styxosaurus snowii and a study on the phylogenetic relationships of this species is published by Sachs, Lindgren & Kear (2018).

=== New taxa ===
Name	Novelty	Status	Authors	Age	Type locality	Country	Notes	Images
Arminisaurus	Gen. et sp. nov	Valid	Sachs & Kear	Early Jurassic (Pliensbachian)	Amaltheenton Formation	Germany	An early relative of pliosaurids. The type species is A. schuberti.	
Paludidraco	Gen. et sp. nov	Valid	De Miguel Chaves, Ortega & Pérez-García	Late Triassic		Spain	A relative of Simosaurus. Genus includes new species P. multidentatus.	
Parahenodus	Gen. et sp. nov	Valid	De Miguel Chaves, Ortega & Pérez-García	Late Triassic (Carnian–Norian)		Spain	A placodont related to Henodus. Genus includes new species P. atancensis.	
Pliosaurus almanzaensis	Sp. nov	Valid	O'Gorman, Gasparini & Spalletti	Late Jurassic (Tithonian)	Vaca Muerta	Argentina		
Sachicasaurus	Gen. et sp. nov	Valid	Páramo-Fonseca, Benavides-Cabra & Gutiérrez	Early Cretaceous (Barremian)	Paja Formation	Colombia	A pliosaurid belonging to the subfamily Brachaucheninae. The type species is S. vitae.	

== Turtles ==
=== Research ===
- A study on the changes in diversity of South American turtles from the Late Triassic to the present, and on major extinction events of South American turtles, is published by Vlachos et al. (2018).
- A study on the Early and Middle Triassic turtle tracks and their implications for the origin of turtles is published by Lichtig et al. (2018).
- Fossil turtle footprints are described from the Triassic (Carnian) localities in eastern Spain by Reolid et al. (2018), who interpret the findings as indicating a freshwater semi-aquatic habit for some early turtles during the early Late Triassic.
- A revision of Late Cretaceous turtle fossils from the El Gallo Formation (Baja California, Mexico) is published by López-Conde et al. (2018).
- A clutch of 15 turtle eggs, found in close association with a partial skeleton of the dinosaur Mosaiceratops azumai, is described from the Upper Cretaceous Xiaguan Formation (China) by Jackson et al. (2018), who report that the size of these eggs exceeds that of all previously reported fossil turtle eggs.
- A study on the anatomy of the brain, inner ear, nasal cavity and skull nerves of Proganochelys quenstedti, and on its implications for inferring the sensory capabilities and ecology of the species and for the evolution of turtle brains is published by Lautenschlager, Ferreira & Werneburg (2018).
- A study on the external variability and abnormalities observed in the carapace and plastron of Proterochersis robusta and Proterochersis porebensis is published by Szczygielski, Słowiak & Dróżdż (2018).
- A study on the anatomy and phylogenetic relationships of Kallokibotion bajazidi based on well-preserved new fossil material is published by Pérez-García & Codrea (2018).
- A study on the paleoecology of Meiolania platyceps is published by Lichtig & Lucas (2018).
- A study on the phylogenetic relationships of extant and fossil pleurodirans is published by Ferreira et al. (2018).
- New fossil material of the bothremydid Algorachelus peregrinus, providing new information on the anatomy and intraspecific variability of the species, is described from the Upper Cretaceous (Cenomanian) of the Arenas de Utrillas Formation (Spain) by Pérez-García (2018), who also transfers the species "Podocnemis" parva Haas (1978) and "Paiutemys" tibert Joyce, Lyson & Kirkland (2016) to the genus Algorachelus.
- A study on the anatomy of the shell of the bothremydid species Taphrosphys congolensis, and on its implications for inferring the taxonomic composition of the genus Taphrosphys, is published online by Pérez García, Mees & Smith (2018).
- A revision of bothremydid fossils in the lower Eocene British record, assigned to the species "Platemys" bowerbankii Owen (1842), "Emys" laevis Bell in Owen & Bell (1849), "Emys" delabechii Bell in Owen & Bell (1849), and "Emys" conybearii Owen (1858), is published by Pérez-García (2018), who interprets all this fossil material as representing a single species Palemys bowerbankii.
- A restudy of the type material of the Late Cretaceous pan-chelid Linderochelys rinconensis and a description of new fossils of the species is published by Jannello et al. (2018).
- Redescription of the Eocene chelid Hydromedusa casamayorensis based on twenty-seven new specimens recovered from lower levels of the Sarmiento Formation (Argentina) and a study on the phylogenetic relationships of this species is published by Maniel et al. (2018).
- Description of the morphology of the skull of the Eocene carettochelyid Anosteira pulchra is published by Joyce, Volpato & Rollot (2018).
- A study on the phylogenetic relationships of the putative emydine Piramys auffenbergi is published by Ferreira, Bandyopadhyay & Joyce (2018), who reinterpret this species as a member of the family Podocnemididae.
- A study on the skull innervation and circulation of Eubaena cephalica, based on data from a new specimen, is published by Rollot, Lyson & Joyce (2018).
- Fragmentary trionychid specimen is described from the Upper Cretaceous (Turonian to Maastrichtian) Nanaimo Group (Vancouver Island, British Columbia, Canada) by Vavrek & Brinkman (2018), representing the first trionychid reported from Cretaceous deposits along the Pacific Coast of North America.
- Taxonomic review of fossil testudinoids from South America is published by de la Fuente, Zacarías & Vlachos (2018).
- A study on the phylogenetic relationships and body size evolution of extant and extinct tortoises is published by Vlachos & Rabi (2018).
- A study on the holotype specimen of a purported tortoise from the Oligocene or early Miocene of Costa Rica, "Testudo" costarricensis, is published by Lichtig, Lucas & Alvarado (2018), who reinterpret this specimen as a fossil of Oligopherus laticunea collected from the Eocene-Oligocene White River Group of the western United States.
- Description of new specimens of the tortoise Manouria oyamai from the Pleistocene of the Okinawa Island (Japan) and a study on the phylogenetic relationships of this species is published by Takahashi, Hirayama & Otsuka (2018).
- A study on the sources of variation in the morphology of the carapaces of extant and fossil common box turtles (Terrapene carolina) is published by Vitek (2018).
- A tail vertebra of the common snapping turtle is described from the late Pleistocene of New Jersey by Brownstein (2018), representing the northernmost occurrence of this species in eastern North America during the Pleistocene.
- Redescription of the holotype of Rhinochelys amaberti from the Cretaceous (Albian) of France and a study on the phylogenetic relationships of this species is published by Scavezzoni & Fischer (2018).
- A study on the anatomy of the skull of the holotype specimen of Desmatochelys lowii is published by Raselli (2018).
- Description of newly identified fossil material of Prionochelys from the collections at McWane Science Center and the Alabama Museum of Natural History, collected from multiple sites from the Upper Cretaceous Mooreville Chalk and Eutaw Formation (Alabama, United States), and a study on the taxonomy and phylogenetic relationships of Prionochelys is published by Gentry (2018).
- A nearly complete skull and mandible of a subadult specimen of Euclastes wielandi is described from the Danian Hornerstown Formation (New Jersey, United States) by Ullmann, Boles & Knell (2018).
- An isolated costal bone of a sea turtle is described from the Oligocene Dos Bocas Formation (Ecuador) by Cadena, Abella & Gregori (2018), representing the first record of Oligocene Pancheloniidae in South America.
- Remains of leatherback sea turtles (Dermochelys coriacea) recovered from Mid to Late Holocene sites at Ra's al-Hamra and Ra's al-Hadd (coastal Oman) are described by Frazier et al. (2018).

=== New taxa ===
Name	Novelty	Status	Authors	Age	Type locality	Country	Notes	Images
Allaeochelys rouzilhacensis	Sp. nov	Valid	Godinot et al.	Eocene		France	A member of the family Carettochelyidae.	
Barnesia	Gen. et comb. nov	Junior homonym	Karl	Eocene (Lutetian)		Germany	A tortoise; a new genus for "Testudo" eocaenica Hummel (1935). The generic name is preoccupied by Barnesia Bertoni (1901) and Barnesia Thalmann (1994).	
Basilemys morrinensis	Sp. nov	Valid	Mallon & Brinkman	Late Cretaceous (early Maastrichtian)	Horseshoe Canyon Formation	Canada (Alberta)	A member of Cryptodira belonging to the family Nanhsiungchelyidae.	
Borkenia eckfeldense	Sp. nov	Valid	Karl	Eocene	Eckfelder Maar	Germany	A member of the family Geoemydidae.	
Borkenia philippeni	Sp. nov	Valid	Karl	Eocene (Lutetian)	Eckfelder Maar	Germany	A member of the family Geoemydidae.	
Chelonoidis dominicensis	Sp. nov	Valid	Albury et al.	Probably Late Quaternary		Dominican Republic	A species of Chelonoidis.	
Eochelone voltregana	Sp. nov	Valid	Lapparent de Broin et al.	Eocene (Priabonian)		Spain	A member of the family Cheloniidae.	
Eochersis	Gen. et sp. nov	Valid	Karl	Eocene (Lutetian)	Eckfelder Maar	Germany	A tortoise. The type species is E. eiflaensis.	
Eochersina	Gen. et comb. nov	Valid	Karl	Eocene (Lutetian)		Austria	A tortoise; a new genus for "Cheirogaster" steinbacheri Karl (1996).	
Eotaphrosphys	Gen. et comb. nov	Valid	Pérez-García	Late Cretaceous (Maastrichtian)		France	A member of Bothremydidae; a new genus for "Tretosternum" ambiguum Gaudry (1890).	
Eulalichelys	Gen. et sp. nov	Valid	De Lapparent de Broin in Godinot et al.	Eocene		France	A member of the family Carettochelyidae. Genus includes new species E. labarrerei.	
Gilmoremys gettyspherensis	Sp. nov	Valid	Joyce, Lyson & Sertich	Late Cretaceous (late Campanian)	Fruitland Formation	United States (New Mexico)		
Jeholochelys	Gen. et sp. nov	Valid	Shao et al.	Early Cretaceous (Aptian)	Jiufotang Formation	China	A member of the family Sinemydidae. The type species is J. lingyuanensis.	
Mauremys aristotelica	Sp. nov	Valid	Vlachos et al.	Late Miocene to Pliocene		Greece	A species of Mauremys.	
Motelomama	Gen. et comb. nov	Valid	Pérez-García	Eocene (Ypresian)		Peru	A member of Bothremydidae; a new genus for "Podocnemis" olssoni Schmidt (1931).	
Owadowia	Gen. et sp. nov	Valid	Szczygielski, Tyborowski & Błażejowski	Late Jurassic (Tithonian)	Kcynia Formation	Poland	A member of Pancryptodira. The type species is O. borsukbialynickae.	
Peritresius martini	Sp. nov	Valid	Gentry et al.	Late Cretaceous (late Campanian)	Lower Ripley Formation	United States (Alabama)	A member of Pancheloniidae.	
Sinemys chabuensis	Sp. nov	Valid	Ji & Chen	Early Cretaceous	Jingchuan Formation	China		
Trachemys haugrudi	Sp. nov	Valid	Jasinski	Late Hemphillian	Gray Fossil Site	United States (Tennessee)	A species of Trachemys.	
Yuraramirim	Gen. et sp. nov	Valid	Ferreira et al.	Late Cretaceous	Adamantina Formation	Brazil	A member of Pleurodira related to Peiropemys. Genus includes new species Y. montealtensis.	

== Archosauriformes ==
=== General research ===
- A study on the diversification of archosauromorph reptiles from the Middle Permian to the early Late Triassic is published by Ezcurra & Butler (2018).
- A study on the phylogenetic relationships of phytosaurs is published by Jones & Butler (2018).

== Other reptiles ==
=== Research ===
- The study on the phylogenetic relationships of mesosaurs and other early reptiles published by Laurin & Piñeiro (2017) is reevaluated by MacDougall et al. (2018).
- An adult specimen of Stereosternum tumidum preserved next to juvenile material, providing new information on the baseline ossification sequences and growth rates in this species, is described from Lower Permian sediments of the Irati Formation (Brazil) by Bickelmann & Tsuji (2018).
- A study evaluating the purported aquatic adaptations of Mesosaurus tenuidens is published by Nuñez Demarco et al. (2018).
- Description of the anatomy of the lower jaw of Delorhynchus is published by Haridy, Macdougall & Reisz (2018).
- Pathological sacral vertebrae of a pareiasaur belonging to the clade Velosauria are described from the Permian (Wuchiapingian) upper member of the Madumabisa Mudstone Formation (Luangwa Basin, Zambia) by Turner & Sidor (2018).
- A new skull ascribed to Procolophon trigoniceps, so far representing the most complete and best preserved specimen collected at the Lower Triassic Sanga do Cabral Supersequence (Brazil), is described by Silva-Neves, Modesto & Dias-da-Silva (2018).
- Fragments of the mandible of a small reptile, possibly Ruhuhuaria reiszi, are described from the Triassic Manda Beds of Tanzania by Bradley & Nesbitt et al. (2018).
- A study on the effect of inclusion and exclusion of autapomorphies on the analyses of phylogenetic relationships of early eureptiles is published by Matzke & Irmis (2018).
- A study on the anatomy and histology of the caudal vertebrae of Permian captorhinids from the Richards Spur locality (Oklahoma, United States), supporting previous hypotheses that Captorhinus and other early Permian captorhinids were capable of tail autotomy, is published by LeBlanc et al. (2018).
- A study on the teeth of Opisthodontosaurus carrolli is published by Haridy, LeBlanc & Reisz (2018), who present evidence of regular tooth replacement events in the lower jaw of O. carrolli.
- Jaw elements of members of an otherwise Gondwanan diapsid genus Palacrodon are described from the Upper Triassic Chinle Formation (Arizona, United States) by Kligman, Marsh & Parker (2018).
- A study evaluating the taxon richness of terrestrial lepidosaurs through time, from the Triassic to the Paleogene, is published by Cleary et al. (2018).
- Description of two specimens of the rhynchocephalian species Clevosaurus hudsoni from the Upper Triassic of the Cromhall Quarry (United Kingdom), providing new information on the anatomy of the species, is published by O'Brien, Whiteside & Marshall (2018).
- A study on a fossil tooth of Eilenodon robustus from the Jurassic Morrison Formation (Colorado, United States), utilizing both X-ray and neutron computed tomography, is published by Jones et al. (2018).
- A study on the anatomy of the skeleton of Pappochelys rosinae is published by Schoch & Sues (2018).
- Probable tanystropheid neck vertebrae are described from the Lower Triassic Sanga do Cabral Formation (Brazil) by De Oliveira et al. (2018).
- A study on the taphonomy of the skeletons of Tanystropheus longobardicus from the Middle Triassic Besano Formation (Monte San Giorgio, Switzerland) and its implications for inferring whether Tanystropheus was terrestrial or aquatic is published by Beardmore & Furrer (2018).
- A re-analysis of the osteology of Tanystropheus, a reconstruction of the musculature of the tail, pelvic girdle and hindlimbs of the taxon and a study on the locomotion and lifestyle of the taxon is published by Renesto & Saller (2018).
- Description of the maxillary tooth plate and dentary teeth of the rhynchosaur species Hyperodapedon sanjuanensis is published by Gentil & Ezcurra (2018).
- Description of a new skeleton of Prolacerta broomi from the Lower Triassic (Induan) Fremouw Formation (Antarctica), constituting the most complete Antarctic specimen to date, is published by Spiekman (2018).
- A study on the morphological variation of the fifth metatarsals of Early Triassic diapsid reptiles from the Czatkowice locality (Poland), assessed in functional and phylogenetic terms, is published by Borsuk-Białynicka (2018).

=== New taxa ===
Name	Novelty	Status	Authors	Age	Type locality	Country	Notes	Images
Clevosaurus cambrica	Sp. nov	Valid	Keeble, Whiteside & Benton	Late Triassic		United Kingdom	A small rhynchocephalian known from Rhaetian fissure fill deposits.	C. cambrica (B)
Colobops	Gen. et sp. nov	Valid	Pritchard et al.	Late Triassic (Norian)	Newark Supergroup	United States (Connecticut)	A reptile of uncertain phylogenetic placement, possibly a rhynchosaur or a rhynchocephalian. The type species is C. noviportensis.	
Elginia wuyongae	Sp. nov	Valid	Liu & Bever	Late Permian	Naobaogou Formation	China	A pareiasaurid parareptile	
Eorhynchochelys	Gen. et sp. nov	Valid	Li et al.	Late Triassic (Carnian)	Falang Formation	China	A stem-turtle. The type species is E. sinensis.	
Fraserosphenodon	Gen. et comb. nov	Valid	Herrera-Flores et al.	Late Triassic		United Kingdom	A rhynchocephalian belonging to the group Opisthodontia; a new genus for "Clevosaurus" latidens Fraser (1993).	
Fraxinisaura	Gen. et sp. nov	Valid	Schoch & Sues	Middle Triassic (Ladinian)		Germany	A member of Lepidosauromorpha, probably a relative of Marmoretta oxoniensis. Genus includes new species F. rozynekae.	
Labidosauriscus	Gen. et sp. nov	Valid	Modesto, Scott & Reisz	Early Permian	Richards Spur locality	United States (Oklahoma)	A member of the family Captorhinidae. Genus includes new species L. richardi.	
Mandaphon	Gen. et sp. nov	Valid	Tsuji	Triassic	Manda Formation	Tanzania	A member of the family Procolophonidae. The type species is M. nadra.	
