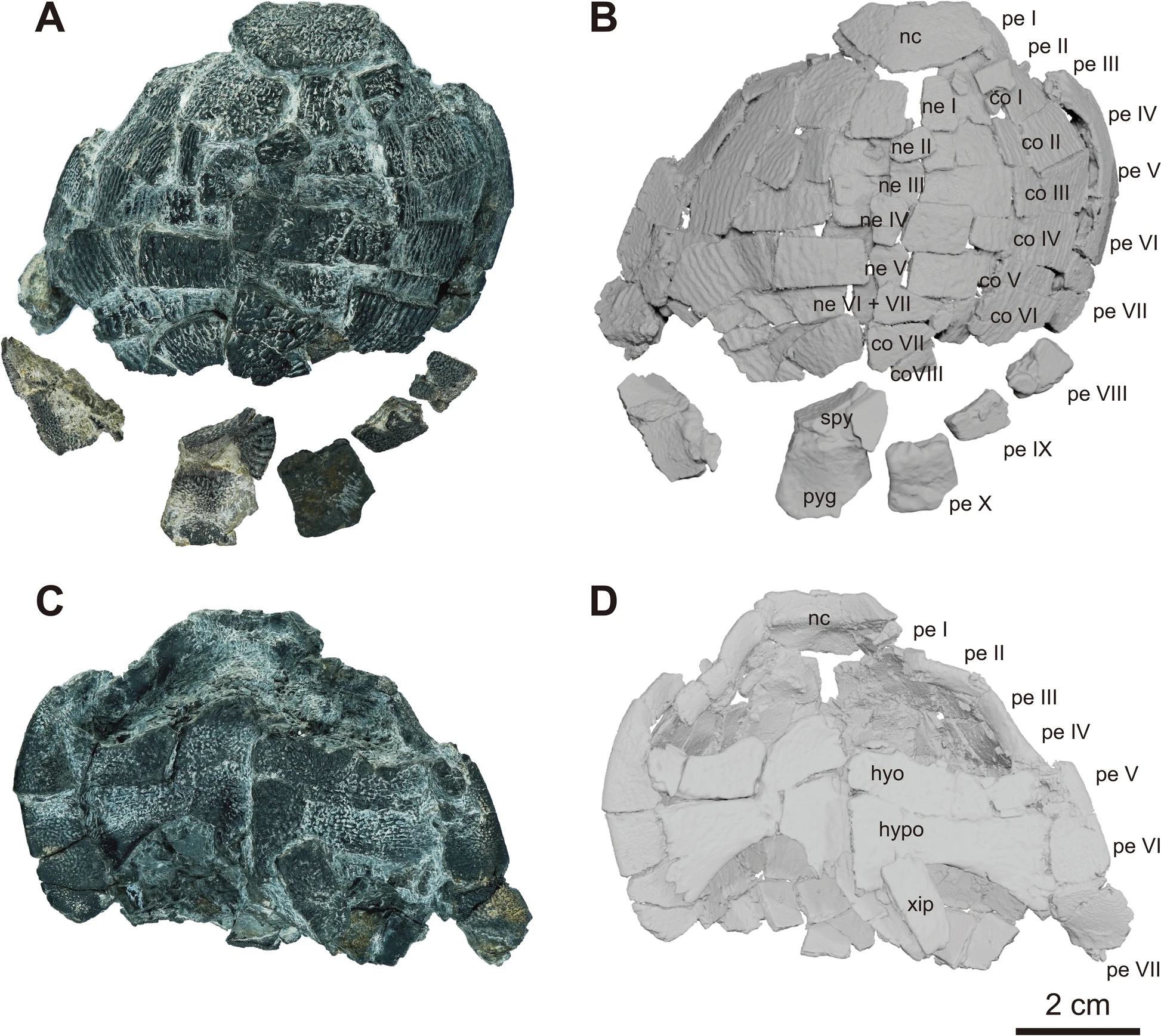
- Photograph in dorsal and ventral view (A, C) and micro-CT generated reconstruction (B, D) of the B. yeosuensis holotype

Scientific classification
- Kingdom: Animalia
- Phylum: Chordata
- Class: Reptilia
- Order: Testudines
- Suborder: Cryptodira
- Family: Carettochelyidae
- Genus: †Byeoljubuchelys; Kim et al., 2025
- Species: †B. yeosuensis

Binomial name
- †Byeoljubuchelys yeosuensis Kim et al., 2025

= Byeoljubuchelys =

Byeoljubuchelys Temporal range: Early Cretaceous (Aptian), ~118–112.4 Ma

Extinct genus of turtles

Byeoljubuchelys (lit. 'Byeoljubu turtle') is an extinct genus of carettochelyid turtles from the Lower Cretaceous (Aptian) Hasandong Formation of Yeosu, South Korea. The genus contains a single species, B. yeosuensis, known from a partial skeleton consisting of a nearly complete shell and associated postcranial elements.

== Discovery and naming ==
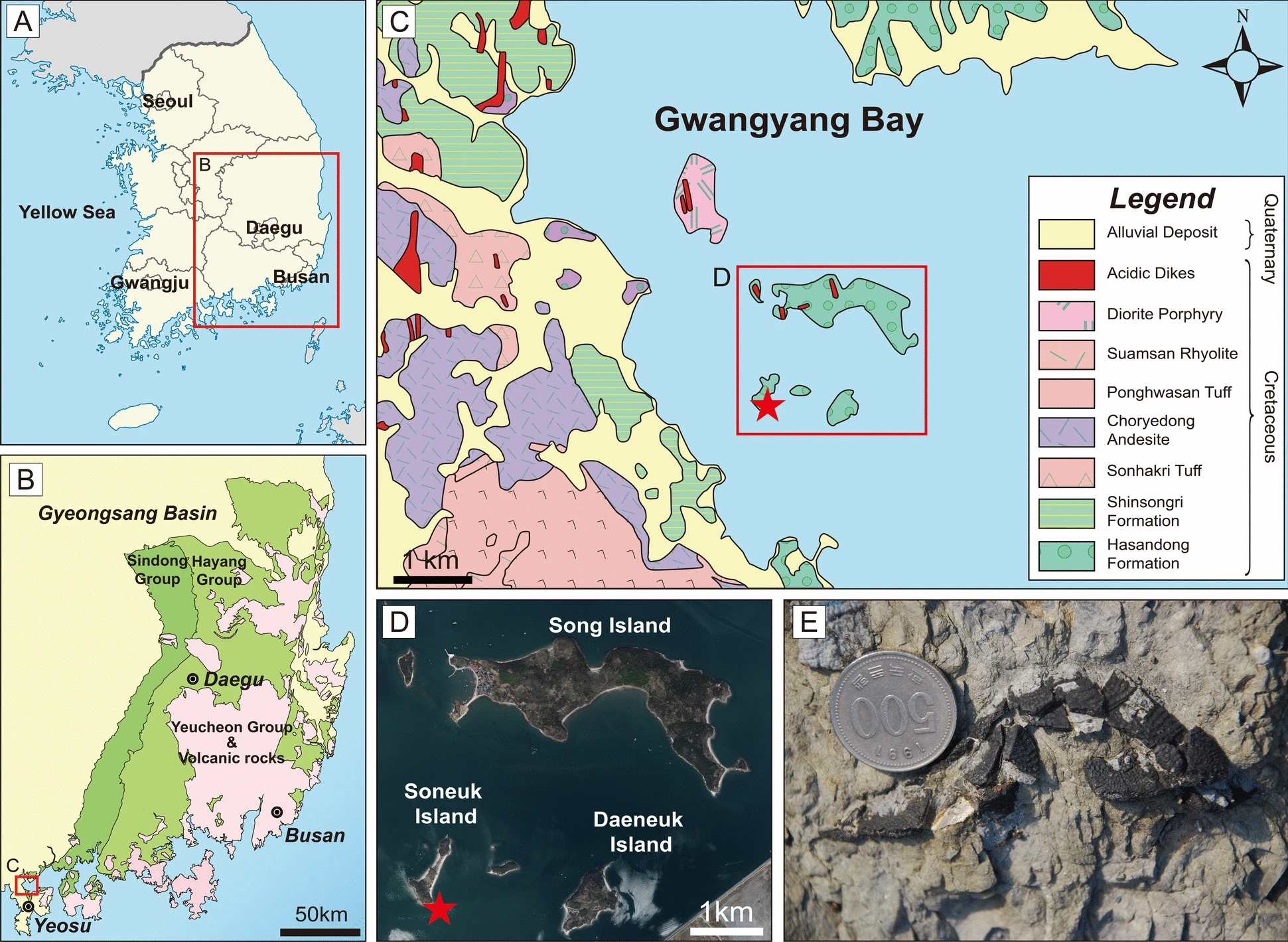
Map of the type locality (A-D) and in-situ photograph (E) of the holotype

The Byeoljubuchelys holotype specimen, KDRC-YS-SR-001, was discovered from the Hasandong Formation in 2009 by paleontologist Min Huh, one of the co-authors who described this taxon. The specimen preserves the nearly complete carapace and plastron, the upper and lower surface of the turtle shell respectively, associated with two cervical vertebrae, partial thoracic vertebrae, one sacral vertebra, partial disarticulated shoulder girdle, partial pelvic bones, right humerus and ulna (upper arm and forearm bones), left femur (upper hindlimb bone), left and right tibiae and fibulae (lower hindlimb bones), and left pes (foot).

In 2025, Minguk Kim and colleagues described Byeoljubuchelys yeosuensis based on this specimen. The generic name, Byeoljubuchelys, combines the Korean fictional turtle character 'Byeoljubu' from a pansori (traditional Korean genre of musical storytelling) called Sugungga, and the Ancient Greek word chelys (χέλυς, 'turtle'). The specific epithet, yeosuensis, is named in reference to the type locality, specifically Yeosu City where the holotype was discovered.

== Description ==
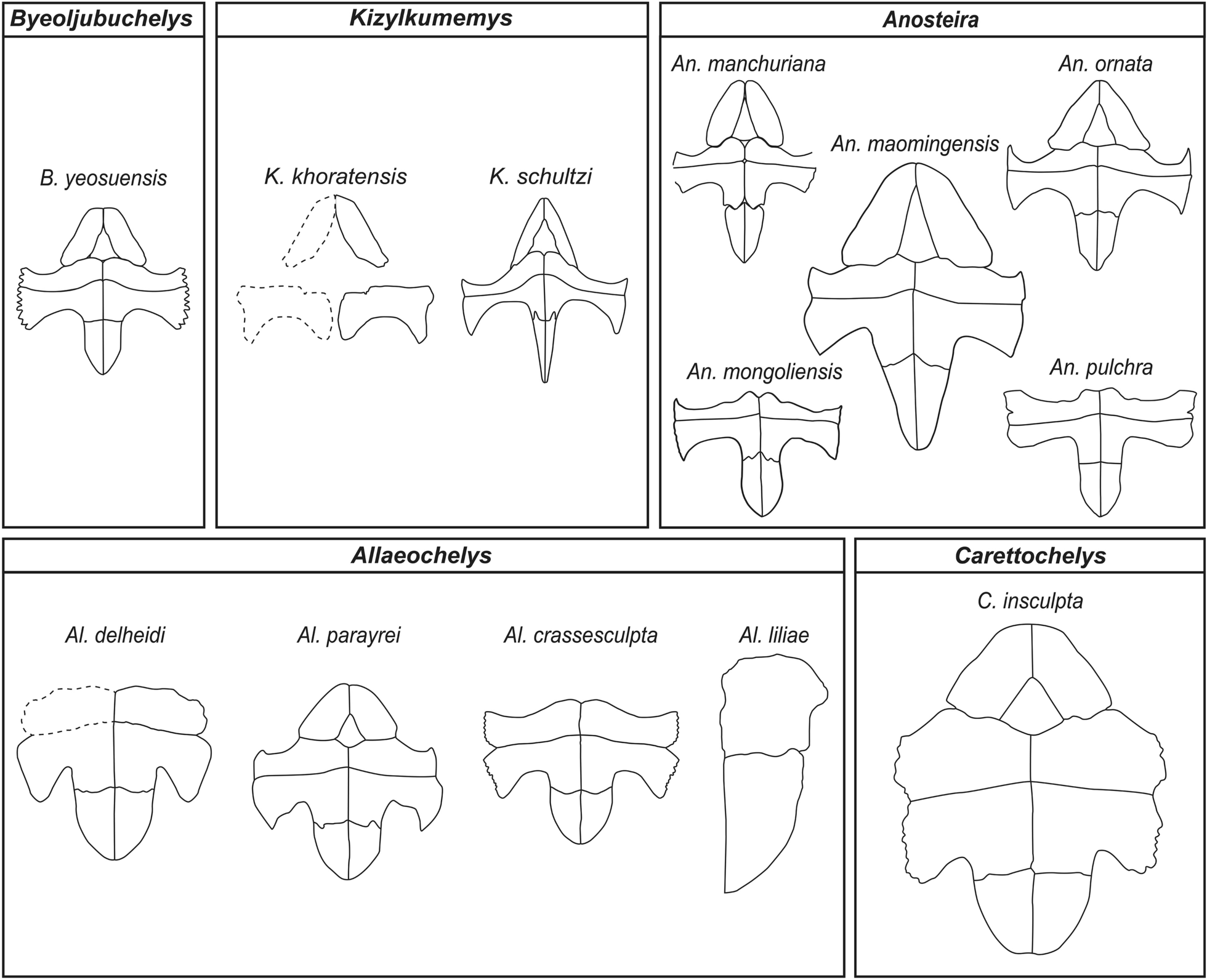
Plastra of Carettochelyidae in ventral view (Byeoljubuchelys on top left)

Byeoljubuchelys is smaller in body size than other carettochelyids, with the preserved portion of the holotype carapace measuring 6 cm (2.4 in) long and 8 cm (3.1 in) wide. The estimated total carapace length is around 8.6 cm (3.4 in), and the specimen likely does not represent a hatchling individual due to the presence of fully developed bones which are indicative of maturity and the absence of fontanelles between the costal and peripheral scutes which are indicative of immaturity. The rounded outline of the carapace resembles that of the extant juvenile pig-nosed turtle, while the cruciform outline and the shape of the plastron resembles that of the extinct Anosteira.

The plastron of Byeoljubuchelys is notably broader and shorter than that of the roughly coeval Kizylkumemys, which refutes the previous hypothesis that all basal (early-diverging) carettochelyids had narrow plastrons. Of the two known species of Kizylkumemys, the slightly older K. khoratensis probably had a broader plastron intermediate between Byeoljubuchelys and K. schultzi, the latter of which had an extremely narrow plastron which is possibly a specialized condition.

While the basal carettochelyids likely had broader plastra than previously assumed as evidenced by Byeoljubuchelys, the plastral width of Byeoljubuchelys compared to that of the more derived carettochelyids still indicate that the plastra generally expanded within the clade, probably representing a structural adaptation to stabilize the carapace more effectively with the increase in body mass among more derived members or a result of selective pressures following the K-Pg extinction. The lack of distinct sulci (the shallow groves that mark the scutes' boundary) suggests that the carapace and plastron of Byeoljubuchelys had a softshell condition and reduced scutes similar to that of the juvenile pig-nosed turtle, and that such features already evolved in the Early Cretaceous.

The angle between the dorsal process and acromion process (summit) of the scapula (shoulder blade) is measured at 95 degrees, and such a high scapular angle can be found in many other aquatic turtles with relatively high, domed shell. The angle between the proximal (upper) and distal (lower) ends of the humerus is measured at 10 degrees, similar to that of most crown turtles but different from that of the pig-nosed turtle which moves underwater using both rowing and flapping locomotion, while the shape of the humerus is similar to that of extant softshell turtles which moves underwater through rowing locomotion only. This suggests that Byeoljubuchelys also solely used rowing locomotion, and that the underwater flapping locomotion in modern carettochelyids likely developed much later in their evolution.

== Classification ==
In their 2025 phylogenetic analyses, Kim and colleagues recovered Byeoljubuchelys as the basalmost member of the Carettochelyidae. The simplified version of their results based on the Bayesian tip-dating analysis is displayed in the cladogram below:

- Carettochelyidae
  - - Byeoljubuchelys yeosuensis
    - - Kizylkumemys khoratensis
      - - Kizylkumemys schultzi
        - - Anosteira node
            - - Anosteira pulchra
              - Anosteira ornata
            - - Anosteira manchuriana
              - - Anosteira maomingensis
                - Anosteira mongoliensis
          - Allaeochelys + Carettochelys node
            ⊞
            - - Allaeochelys lingnanica
              - - Allaeochelys delheidi
                - - Allaeochelys crassesculpta
                  - - Allaeochelys magnifica
                    - - Allaeochelys parayrei
                      - - Allaeochelys liliae
                        - - Allaeochelys libyca
                          - Carettochelys insculpta
            ⊟

== Paleoenvironment ==
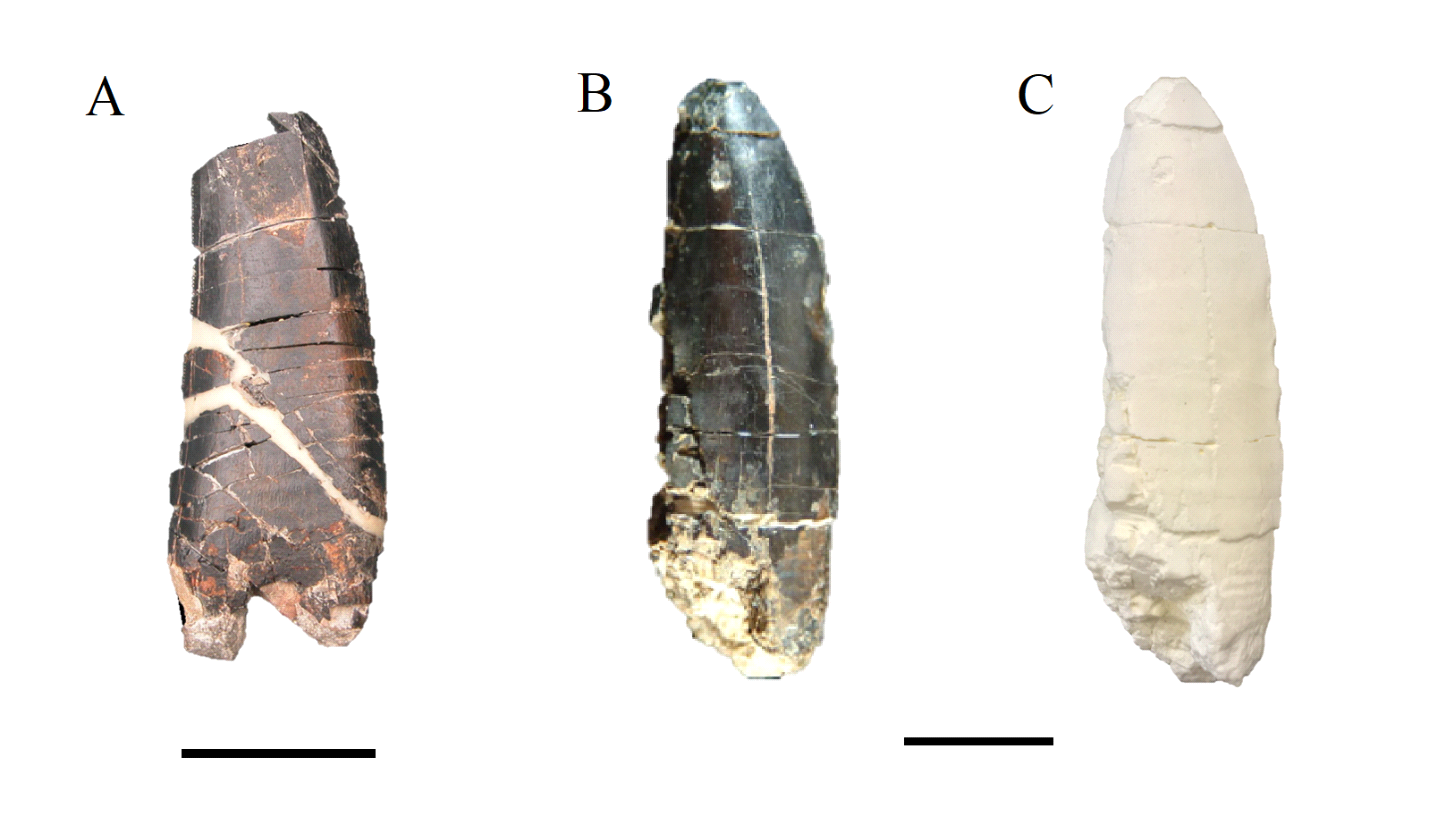
Indeterminate carchardontosaurid teeth from the Hasandong Formation

The Hasandong Formation is part of the Sindong Group, the lowermost group of the Gyeongsang Supergroup that fills the largest non-marine Cretaceous basin in Korea, the Gyeongsang Basin. It has been dated between the Aptian stage of the Early Cretaceous, between approximately 118.0 ± 2.6 Ma and 112.4 ± 1.3 Ma, during which the volcanic activity initiated inside the Gyeongsang Basin. The Hasandong Formation is thought to have been a floodplain in a meandering river system with wet and dry seasons. Vertebrate fossils recovered from the formation include the indeterminate titanosaurifom sauropods such as the dubious genus Pukyongosaurus, indeterminate tyrannosauroid and carcharodontosaurid theropods, indeterminate hadrosauroid ornithopods, indeterminate dsungaripterid and other pterodactyloid pterosaurs, indeterminate crocodyliforms, indeterminate species of actinopterygiian fish genera Sinamia and Lepidotes, and the adocid turtle Proadocus. Fossils of the indeterminate insect fragments, the ostracod Cypridea cf. trita, and various mollusc genera (Brotiopsis, Nagdongia, Plicatounio, Probaicalia, Trigonioides and Viviparus) have also been recovered from this formation.
