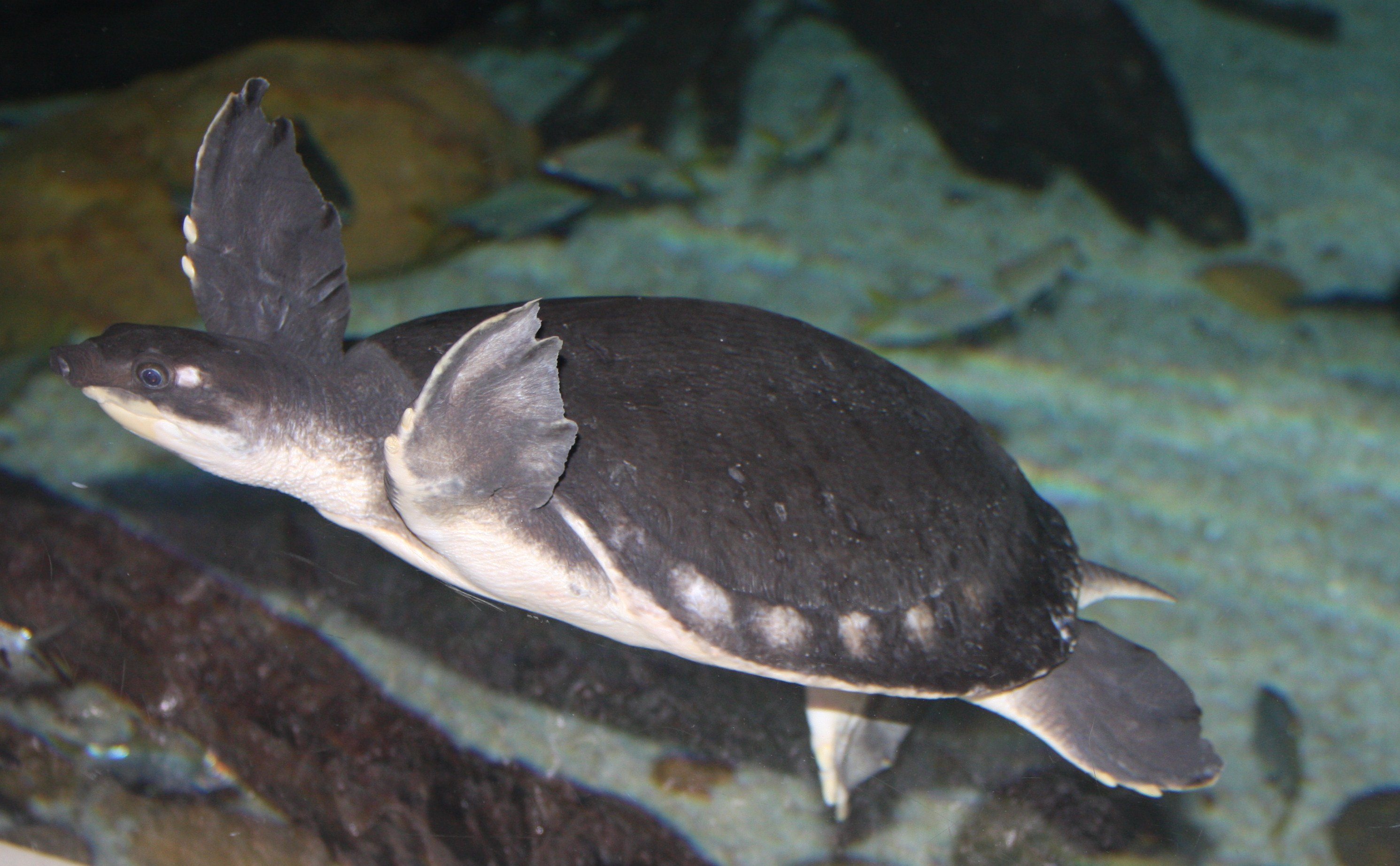
- In Siam Center, Thailand

Conservation status
- Endangered (IUCN 3.1)
- CITES Appendix II

Scientific classification
- Kingdom: Animalia
- Phylum: Chordata
- Class: Reptilia
- Order: Testudines
- Suborder: Cryptodira
- Superfamily: Trionychia
- Family: Carettochelyidae
- Genus: Carettochelys; Ramsay, 1886
- Species: C. insculpta

Binomial name
- Carettochelys insculpta Ramsay, 1886

Synonyms
- Carettocchelys insculptus Ramsay, 1886; Carettochelys insculpta — Boulenger, 1889; Chelodina insculpta — Cann, 1997; Carettochelys canni Artner, 2003 (nomen nudum)

= Pig-nosed turtle =

Species of turtle

The pig-nosed turtle (Carettochelys insculpta), also known as the Fly River turtle, pitted-shelled turtle, and the Warrajan, is a species of turtle which is native to northern Australia and southern New Guinea. It is the only living member of the genus Carettochelys and family Carettochelyidae, a family which also contains many fossil species with their closest relatives being the softshell turtles (family Trionychidae).

== Taxonomy ==
C. insculpta is the only living member of the genus Carettochelys, the subfamily Carettochelyinae, and the family Carettochelyidae, with Carettochelyidae being one of two families in the Trionychia, alongside Trionychidae (softshell turtles). Carettochelyidae has an extensive fossil record extending into the Early Cretaceous, and was formerly widespread, with fossils having been found in Asia, North America, Europe, Africa and Australia. Some literature claims two subspecies, but a 2010 paper rejects this. A fossil species of the genus, Carettochelys niahensis is known from the Neogene of Borneo.

Cladogram of Carettochelyidae after Kim et al. 2025.

- Carettochelyidae
  - - †Byeoljubuchelys yeosuensis
    - - †Kizylkumemys khoratensis
      - - †Kizylkumemys schultzi
        - - †Anosteira
            - - Anosteira pulchra
              - Anosteira ornata
            - - Anosteira manchuriana
              - - Anosteira maomingensis
                - Anosteira mongoliensis
          - †Allaeochelys + Carettochelys
            - - †Allaeochelys lingnanica
              - - †Allaeochelys delheidi
                - - †Allaeochelys crassesculpta
                  - - †Allaeochelys magnifica
                    - - †Allaeochelys parayrei
                      - - †Allaeochelys liliae
                        - - †Allaeochelys libyca
                          - Carettochelys insculpta (pig-nosed turtle)

== Description ==
(video) Pig-nosed turtle swimming

The pig-nosed turtle is unlike any other species of freshwater turtle in its combination of traits. The feet are flippers, resembling those of marine turtles. The nose looks like that of a pig, having the nostrils at the end of a fleshy snout, hence the common name. The carapace is typically grey or olive, with a leathery texture, while the plastron is cream-coloured. Males can be distinguished from females by their longer and narrower tails. The pig-nosed turtles can grow to about 70 to 75 cm (28 to 30 in) straight carapace length, with a weight of over 20 kg (44 lb).

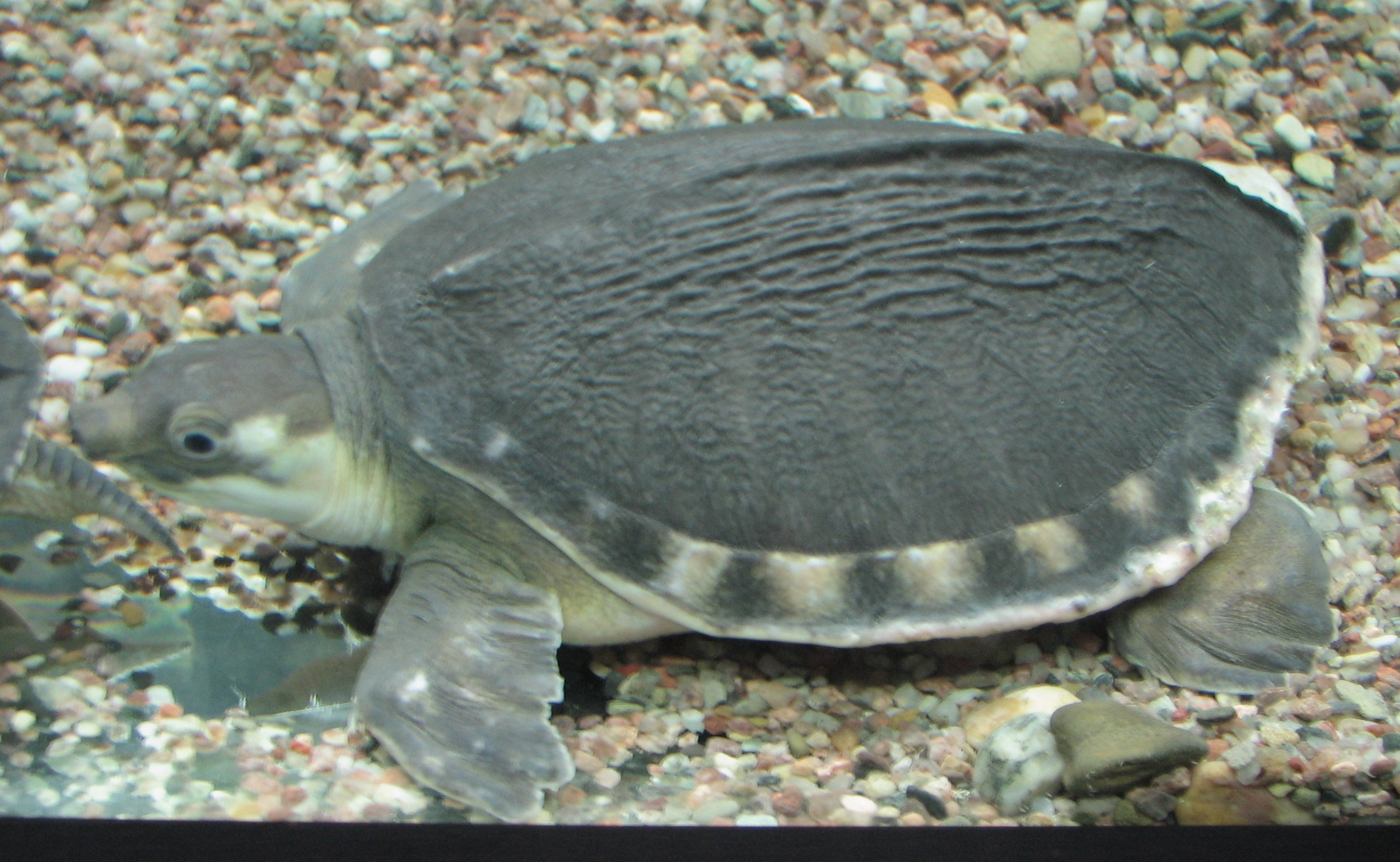
C. insculpta in captivity

Unlike the soft-shelled turtles of the family Trionychidae, the pig-nosed turtle retains a domed bony carapace beneath its leathery skin, rather than a flat plate. It also retains a solid plastron, connected to the carapace by a strong bony bridge, rather than the soft margin of the trionychids.

== Behaviour ==
The pig-nosed turtle is not completely aquatic. Little is known about its general behavior, as there have been few studies in the wild. It's known for its extreme aggression in captivity suggests the species is markedly more territorial than most other turtles and tortoises. It seems to display a degree of social structure during the cooler dry season around the hydrothermal vents that line some river systems it inhabits.

=== Feeding ===
C. insculpta is omnivorous, eating a wide variety of plant and animal matter, including the flowers, fruit and leaves of figs, as well as preying upon crustaceans, molluscs and insects.

=== Breeding ===
Females of C. insculpta reach maturity at 18 or more years, and males around 16 years. The females lay their eggs late in the dry season on sandy river banks.

When the offspring are fully developed, they will stay inside the eggs in hibernation until conditions are suitable for emergence. Hatching may be triggered when the eggs have been flooded with water or by a sudden drop in air pressure signaling an approaching storm.

Using environmental triggers, along with vibrations created by other hatching turtles in the same clutch, gives a better chance for survival. Using a universal trigger rather than simply waiting for incubation to finish means they all hatch at the same time. This provides safety in numbers; also, the more turtles that hatch, the more help they have to dig through the sand to the surface.

== Geographic range and habitat ==
C. insculpta is native to freshwater streams, lagoons and rivers of the Northern Territory of Australia, as well as to the island of New Guinea, where it is believed to occur in all the larger, and some smaller, southward-flowing rivers.

== Status and conservation ==
C. insculpta experienced a population decline of more than 50% in the thirty years between 1981 and 2011. Although the pig-nosed turtle is protected in Indonesia under Law No. 5/1990 on Natural Resources and Ecosystems Conservation, smuggling occurs. Some 11,000 pig-nosed turtles captured from smugglers were released into their habitats in the Wania River, Papua Province, Indonesia, on 30 December 2010. In March 2009, more than 10,000 pig-nosed turtles retrieved from smugglers were also released into the Otakwa River in Lorentz National Park. 687 pig-nosed turtles were seized at an Indonesian airport in March 2013. They were reportedly destined for Hong Kong.

In Papua New Guinea, herpetologist Yolarnie Amepou runs the Piku Biodiversity Network Inc. which empowers local communities to monitor turtle populations and set their own targets for harvest, in the hope of building sustainable practices to preserve the population.

Illegal harvest and trafficking of pig-nosed turtles continues on a large scale. An analysis of 26 reported seizures over the period 2013 to 2020, of which 20 took place in Indonesia and the remaining five in other parts of Asia with the turtles being trafficked from Indonesia, involved a total of 52,374 pig-nosed turtles.

== Captive care ==
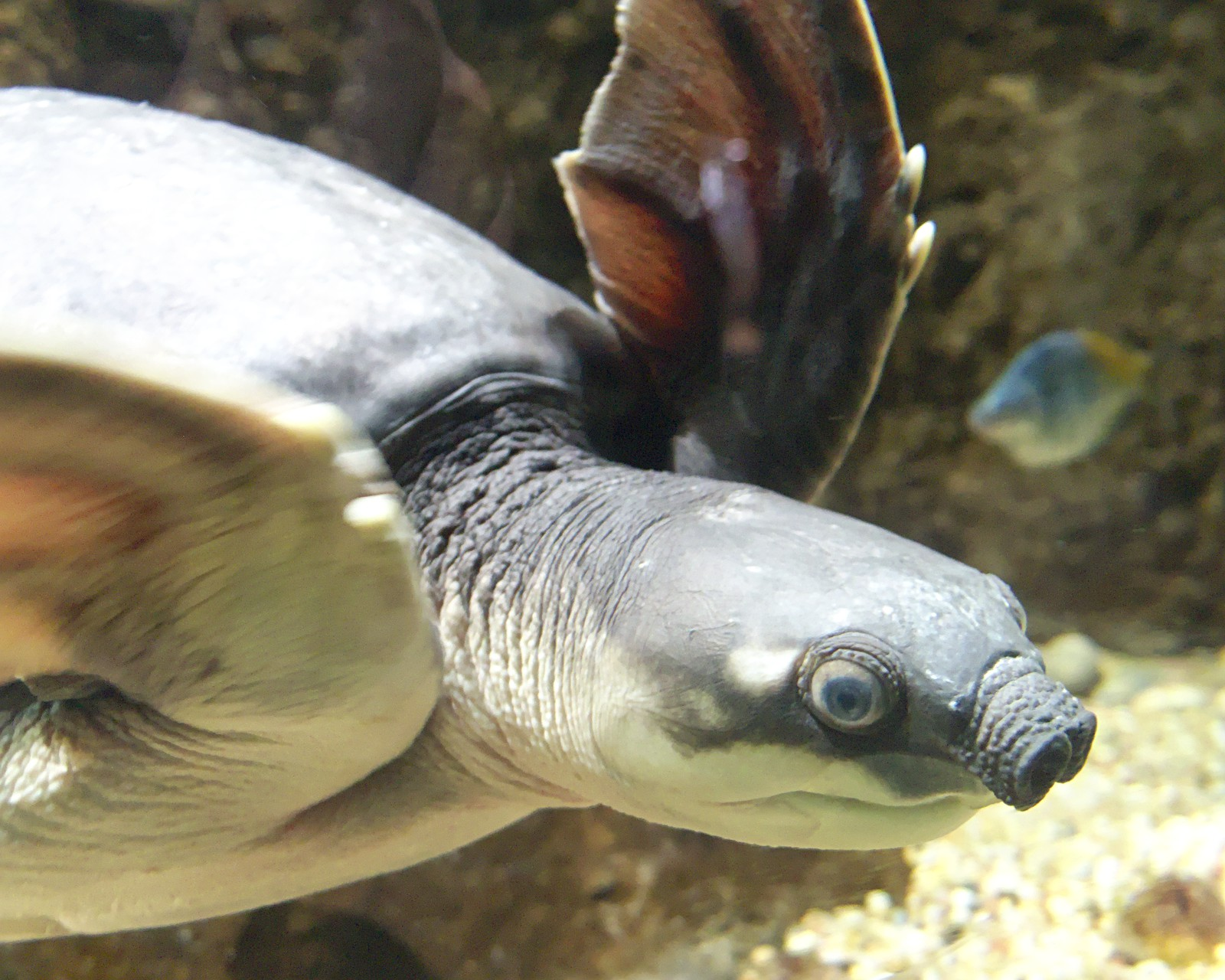
Carettochelys insculpta at the Los Angeles Zoo

Pig-nosed turtles have become available through the exotic pet trade, with a few instances of captive breeding. While juveniles are small and grow slowly, their high cost and large potential size makes them suitable only for experienced aquatic turtle keepers. They tend to be shy and prone to stress. They get sick easily, which can cause problems with their feeding, but they are known to eat commercially available processed turtle pellets or trout chow, as well as various fruits and vegetables. Breeding is rarely an option to the hobbyist, as adults are highly aggressive and will attack each other in all but the largest enclosures.

Wild populations of this turtle are declining rapidly because of illegal capture for the pet trade. It is estimated that between 2003 and 2013, more than 80,000 individuals were confiscated in 30 seizures in Papua New Guinea and Indonesia.
