= Ebenavia robusta =

Scientific classification
- Kingdom: Animalia
- Phylum: Chordata
- Class: Reptilia
- Order: Squamata
- Suborder: Gekkota
- Family: Gekkonidae
- Genus: Ebenavia
- Species: E. robusta

Binomial name
- Ebenavia robusta Hawlitschek, Scherz, Ruthensteiner, Crottini, & Glaw, 2018

Species of lizard

Ebenavia robusta is a gecko species of the genus Ebenavia that is native to Madagascar.
