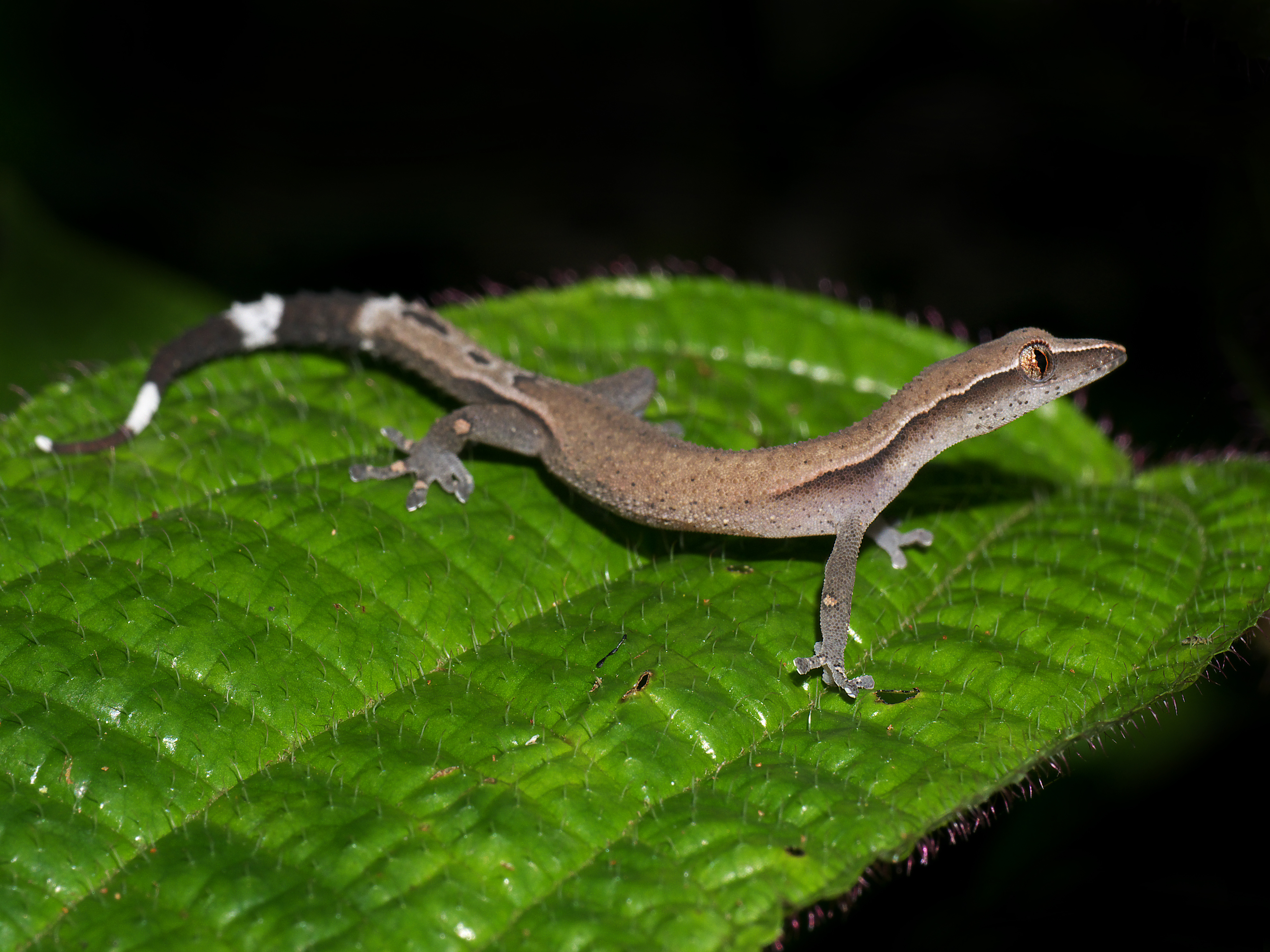
- Ebenavia inunguis

Scientific classification
- Domain: Eukaryota
- Kingdom: Animalia
- Phylum: Chordata
- Class: Reptilia
- Order: Squamata
- Infraorder: Gekkota
- Family: Gekkonidae
- Subfamily: Uroplatinae
- Genus: Ebenavia; Boettger, 1878

Diversity
- 6 species (see text)
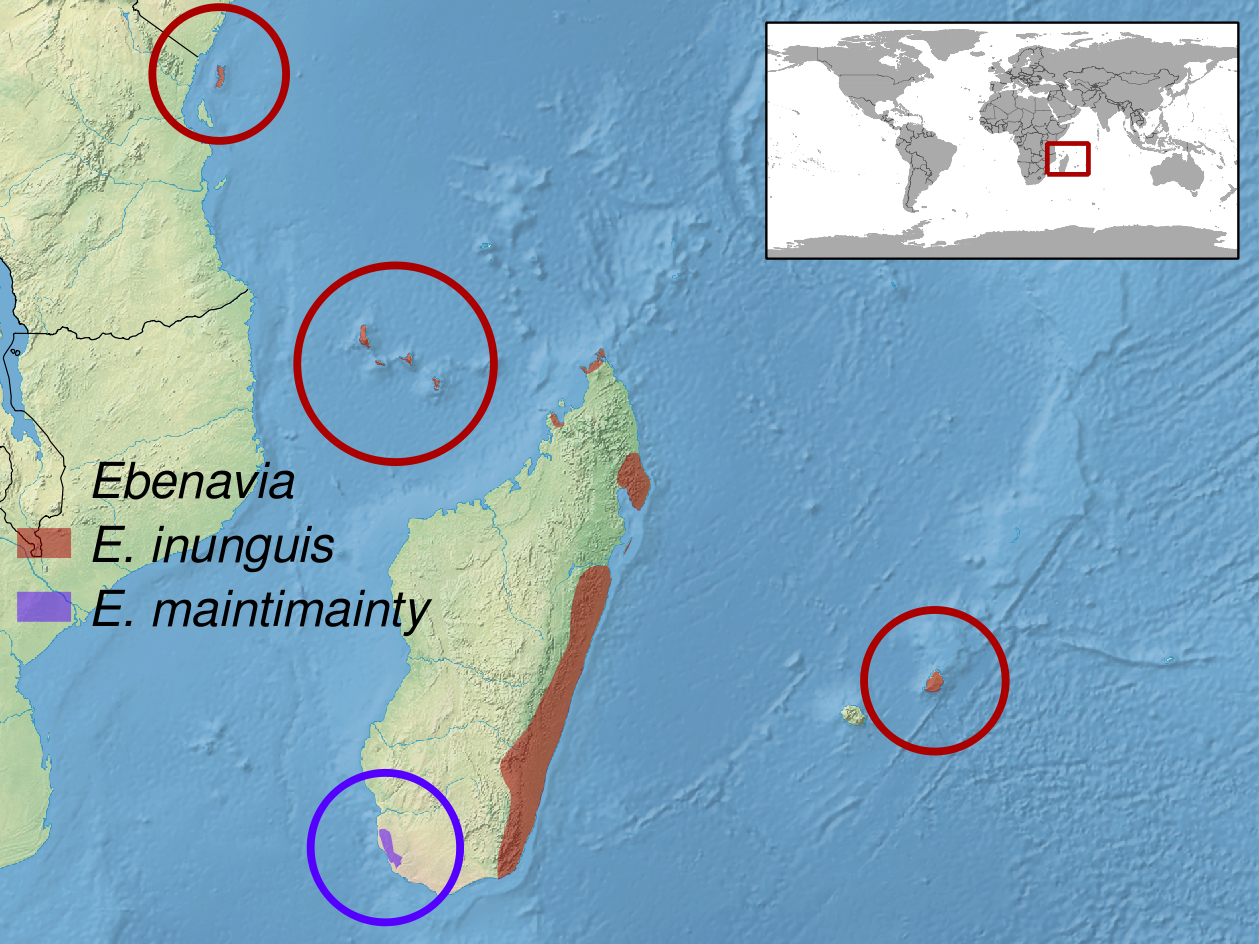

= Ebenavia =

Genus of lizards

Ebenavia is a small genus of geckos from Madagascar, Comoros, and Tanzania. It currently has 6 species.

== Species ==
The 6 species are:

- Ebenavia boettgeri Boulenger, 1885
- Ebenavia inunguis Boettger, 1878 — Madagascar clawless gecko
- Ebenavia maintimainty Nussbaum & Raxworthy, 1998
- Ebenavia robusta Hawlitschek, Scherz, Ruthensteiner, Crottini, & Glaw, 2018
- Ebenavia safari Hawlitschek, Scherz, Ruthensteiner, Crottini, & Glaw, 2018
- Ebenavia tuelinae Hawlitschek, Scherz, Ruthensteiner, Crottini, & Glaw, 2018
