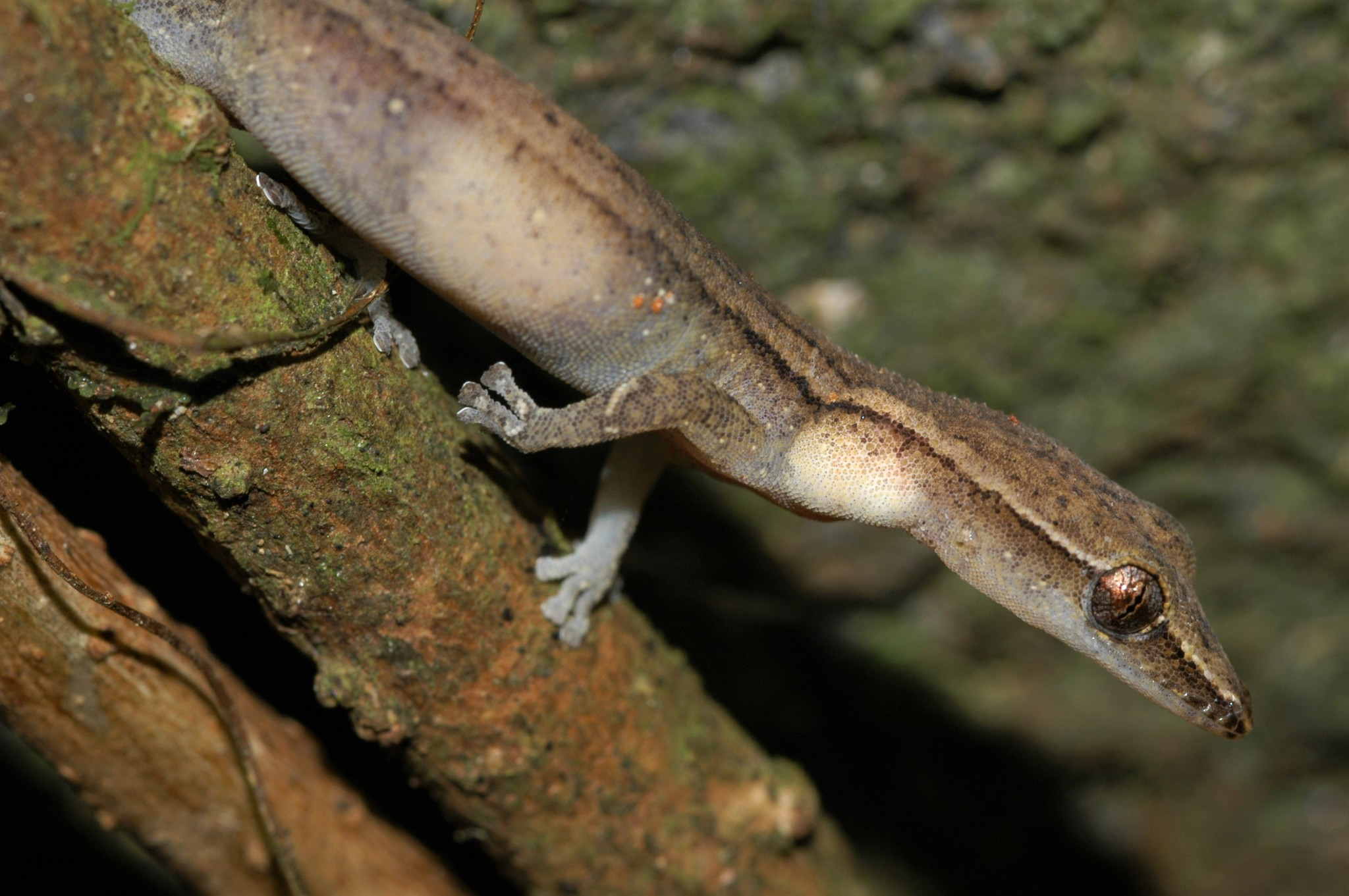

Scientific classification
- Kingdom: Animalia
- Phylum: Chordata
- Class: Reptilia
- Order: Squamata
- Suborder: Gekkota
- Family: Gekkonidae
- Genus: Ebenavia
- Species: E. boettgeri

Binomial name
- Ebenavia boettgeri Boulenger, 1885

= Ebenavia boettgeri =

Species of lizard

Ebenavia boettgeri is a small species of gecko that is native to the island of Madagascar. It is sometimes considered conspecific with Ebenavia inunguis.
