= Ebenavia tuelinae =

Scientific classification
- Kingdom: Animalia
- Phylum: Chordata
- Class: Reptilia
- Order: Squamata
- Suborder: Gekkota
- Family: Gekkonidae
- Genus: Ebenavia
- Species: E. tuelinae

Binomial name
- Ebenavia tuelinae Hawlitschek, Scherz, Ruthensteiner, Crottini, & Glaw, 2018

Species of lizard

Ebenavia tuelinae is a gecko species of the genus Ebenavia that is native to the Comoro Islands.
