= Carettochelys niahensis =

Carettochelys niahensis Temporal range: Unknown, likely sometime between the Oligocene and Pleistocene

Scientific classification
- Kingdom: Animalia
- Phylum: Chordata
- Class: Reptilia
- Order: Testudines
- Suborder: Cryptodira
- Family: Carettochelyidae
- Genus: Carettochelys
- Species: †C. niahensis

Binomial name
- †Carettochelys niahensis White et al., 2023

Extinct species of Carettochelys

Carettochelys niahensis is an extinct species of carettochelyid turtle in the genus Carettochelys that inhabited what is now Malaysia sometimes between the Oligocene and Pleistocene.

== Etymology ==
The specific epithet niahensis is a reference to Niah Great Cave in Sarawak, where the holotype was discovered.
