= Barnesia =

Barnesia Temporal range: Middle Eocene

Scientific classification
- Kingdom: Animalia
- Phylum: Chordata
- Class: Mammalia
- Infraclass: Placentalia
- Order: Primates
- Suborder: Strepsirrhini
- Family: †Notharctidae
- Genus: †Barnesia; Thalmann, 1994
- Species: †B. hauboldi

Binomial name
- †Barnesia hauboldi Thalmann, 1994

Extinct genus of primates

Barnesia is a genus of adapiform primate that lived in Europe during the middle Eocene.
