= Eckfelder Maar =

Fossil site and oldest known maar, in the Eifel mountains in Germany

Coordinates: 50°06′56″N 6°49′07″E

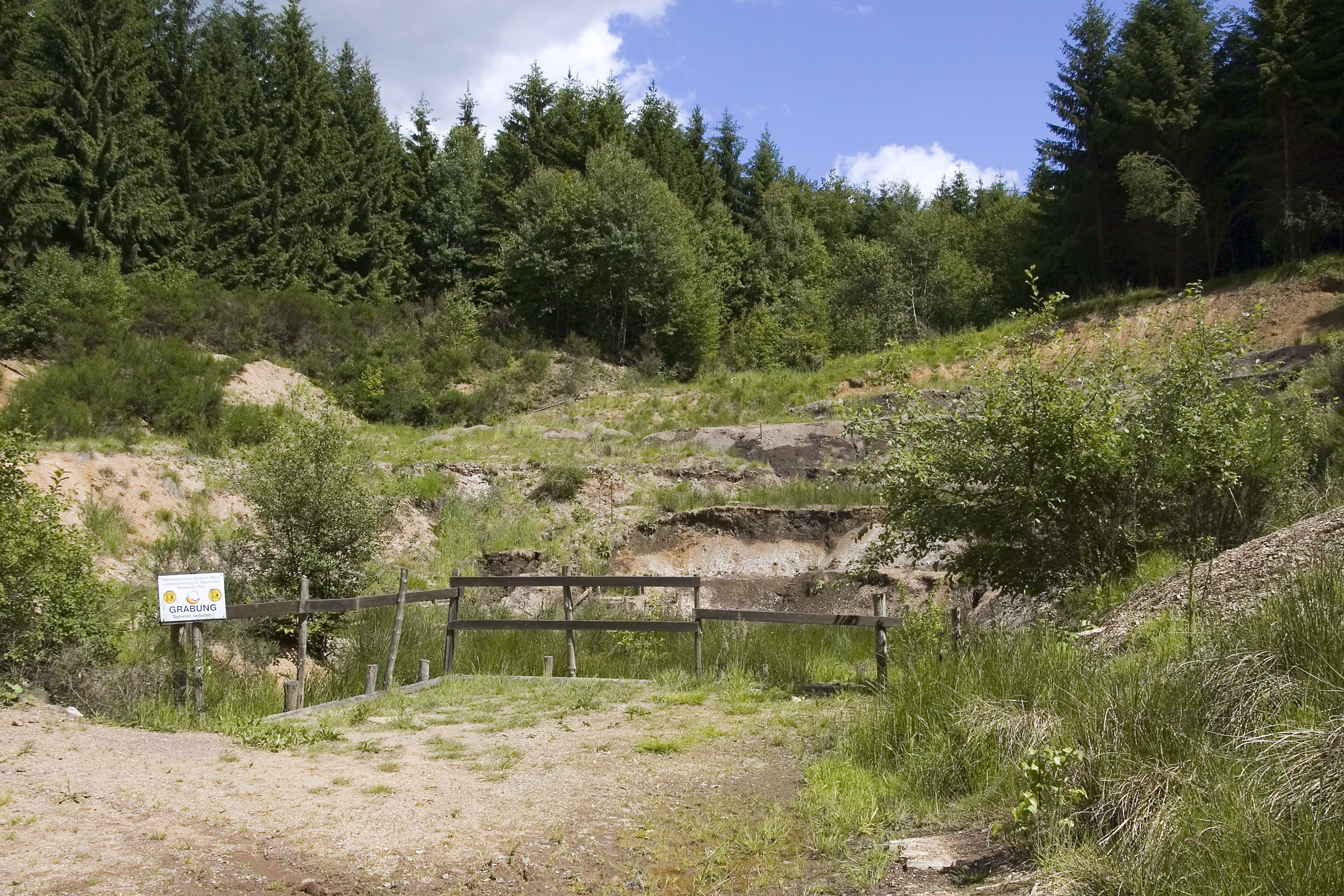
The Eckfelder Maar

The Eckfelder Maar is a former volcanic lake, that was formed during the Middle Eocene around 44.3 million years ago and is thus the oldest known maar. It lies in the southwestern Eifel mountains near Manderscheid in Germany. It is also an important fossil site that contains numerous fossil remains of fauna and flora, some of them nearly complete state of preservation. It has been continuously scientifically researched since 1987. The large number of finds - to date 25,000 fossil specimens have been found - have enabled a very detailed reconstruction of the landscape. This maar, a low volcanic crater, along with research areas at the Grube Messel and the Geiseltal valley, is one of the foremost palaeontological sites for this geological epoch in Central Europe and worldwide.
