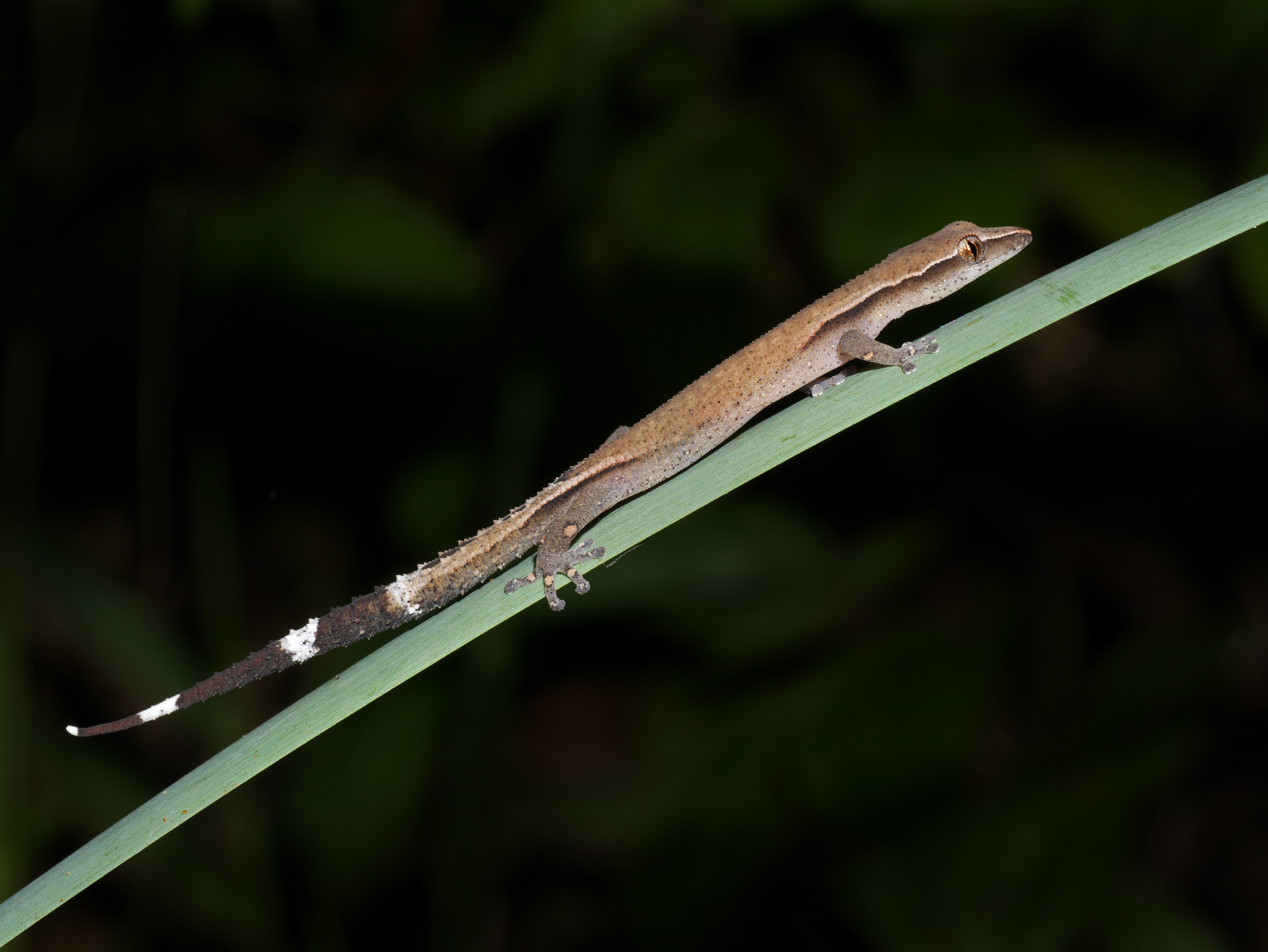

Scientific classification
- Kingdom: Animalia
- Phylum: Chordata
- Class: Reptilia
- Order: Squamata
- Suborder: Gekkota
- Family: Gekkonidae
- Genus: Ebenavia
- Species: E. inunguis

Binomial name
- Ebenavia inunguis (Boettger, 1878)
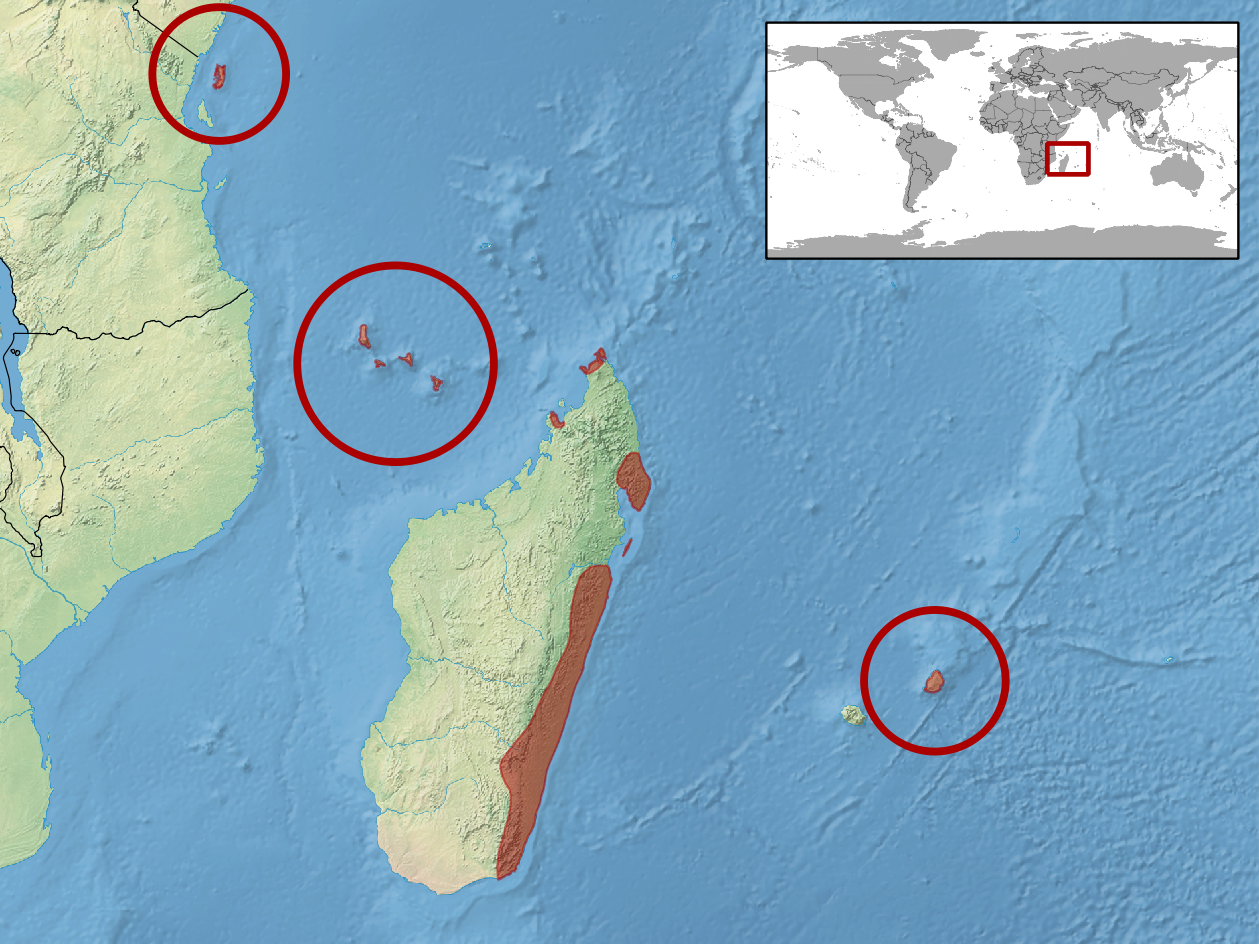
- distribution

= Madagascar clawless gecko =

Species of lizard

The Madagascar clawless gecko (Ebenavia inunguis) is a small nocturnal species. It is found on the Indian Ocean islands of Madagascar, Mauritius, the Comores and Pemba island. By day they hide under the bark of big rainforest trees or in leaf litter. Despite their name, females of the species do have claws.
