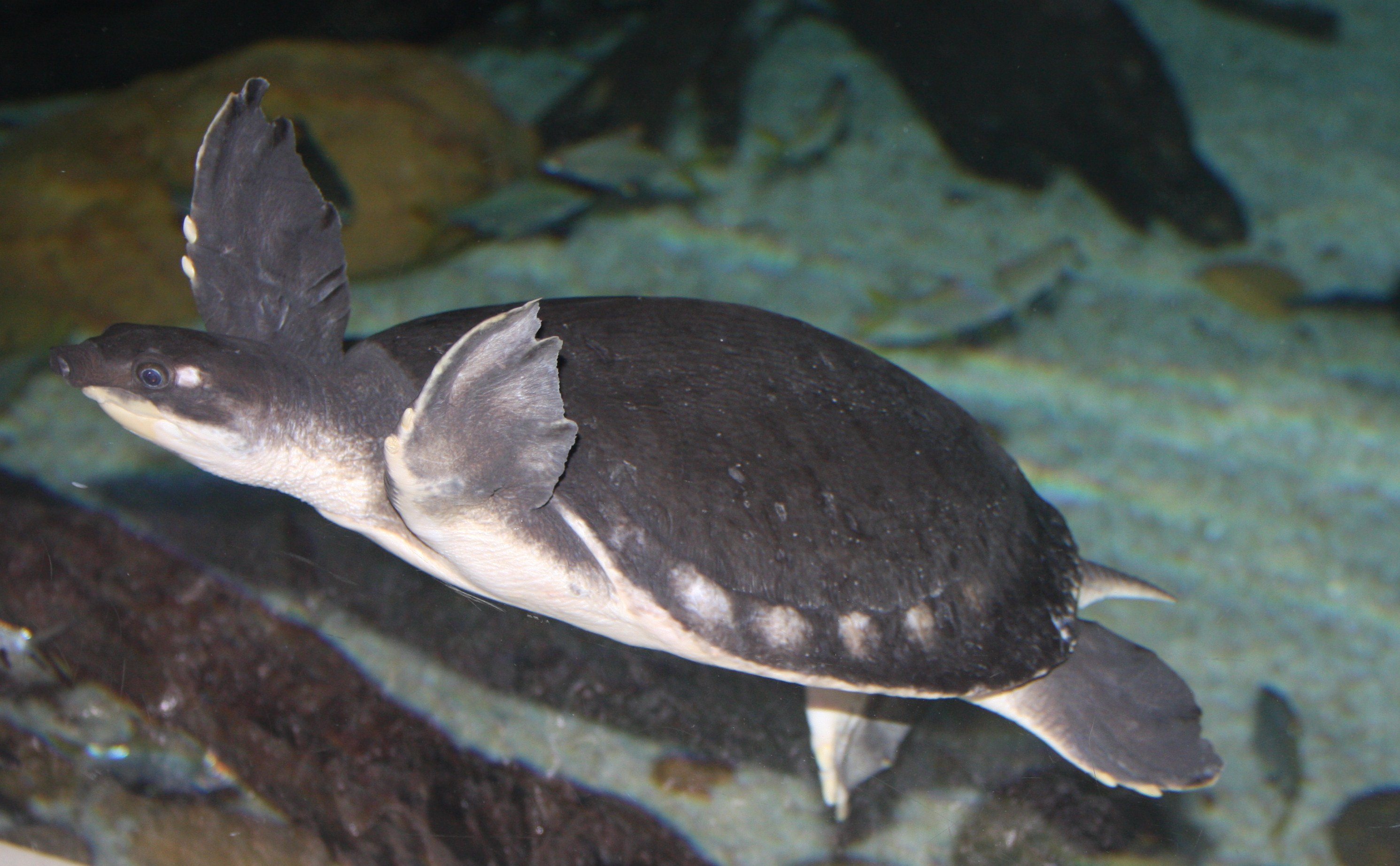
- Pig-nosed turtle (Carettochelys insculpta)
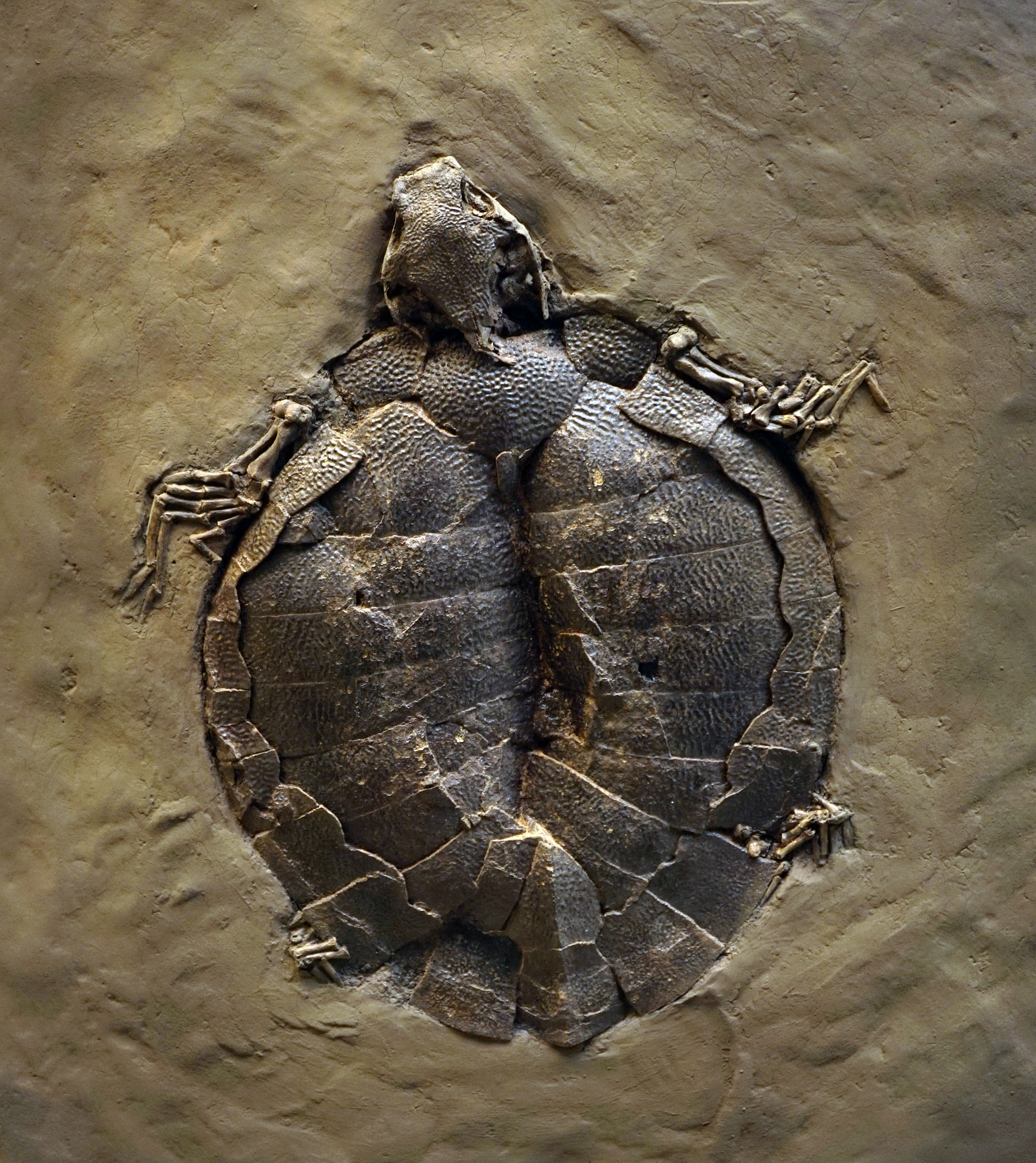
- Fossil of Allaeochelys crassesculptata

Scientific classification
- Kingdom: Animalia
- Phylum: Chordata
- Class: Reptilia
- Order: Testudines
- Suborder: Cryptodira
- Superfamily: Trionychia
- Family: Carettochelyidae; Gill, 1889

Genera
- See text

= Carettochelyidae =

Carettochelyidae Temporal range: Aptian–Recent

Family of turtles

Carettochelyidae is a family of cryptodiran turtles belonging to the Trionychia. It contains only a single living species, the pig-nosed turtle (Carettochelys insculpta) native to New Guinea and Northern Australia. Stem-group carettochelyids are known from the Cretaceous of Asia, with the family being widely distributed across North America, Europe, Asia and Africa during much of the Cenozoic.

== Taxonomy ==
After Joyce, 2014 unless otherwise noted.

- Carettochelyidae sensu Kim et al. 2025 (also known Pan-Carettochelys Joyce, Parham and Gauthier 2004)
  - Byeoljubuchelys Kim et al., 2025
    - Byeoljubuchelys yeosuensis Kim et al., 2025 Hasandong Formation, South Korea, Early Cretaceous (Aptian)
  - Kizylkumemys Nessov, 1976
    - Kizylkumemys khoratensis Tong et al., 2005 Khok Kruat Formation, Thailand, Early Cretaceous (Aptian)
    - Kizylkumemys schultzi Nessov, 1976 Khodzhakul Formation, Uzbekistan, Late Cretaceous (Cenomanian)
  - Indeterminate fragments of stem-carettochelyids are also known from the Cenomanian aged Bayan Shireh Formation, Mongolia, which were originally assigned to "Anosteira" shuwalovi Chkhikvadze in Shuvalov and Chkhikvadze, 1979, which Joyce 2014 regarded as a nomen dubium.
  - Carettochelyidae Gill, 1889 sensu Joyce 2014.
    - Anosteira Leidy, 1871
      - Anosteira manchuriana Zangerl, 1947 Liaoning, China, late Eocene
      - Anosteira maomingensis Chow and Liu, 1955 Youkanwo Formation, Guangdong, China, Late Eocene
      - Anosteira mongoliensis Gilmore, 1931 Inner Mongolia, China, Late Eocene-Oligocene
      - Anosteira ornata Leidy, 1871 Bridger Formation, Wyoming, USA, Early Eocene
      - Anosteira pulchra (Clark, 1932) Uinta Formation, Utah, USA, Middle Eocene (Lutetian)
    - Chorlakkichelys shahi De Broin, 1987 from the Early Eocene (Lutetian) aged Kuldana Formation, Khyber Pakhtunkhwa, Pakistan was considered to be a nomem dubium and an indeterminate carettochelyid by Joyce, 2014, due to the fragmentary and heavily eroded nature of the specimens.
    - Carettochelyinae Williams, 1950
      - Eulalichelys, De Lapparent de Broin in Godinot, 2018
        - Eulalichelys labarrerei (De Lapparent de Broin in Godinot, 2018) Aude, France, Early Eocene (Ypresian)
      - Allaeochelys Noulet, 1867
        - Allaeochelys crassesculpta (Harrassowitz, 1922) Messel Pit, Germany, Early Eocene
        - Allaeochelys delheidi (Dollo, 1886) Brussels Formation, Belgium, Zamora, Spain, Early Eocene Headon Hill Formation, England, Late Eocene (Priabonian)
        - Allaeochelys libyca Havlik et al, 2014, Al Wahat District, Libya, middle Miocene (Langhian)
        - Allaeochelys lingnanica (Young and Chow, 1962) Shaoguan, Guangdong, China early Paleogene (possibly Paleocene)
        - Allaeochelys magnifica (=Burmemys magnifica Hutchison et al., 2004) Pandaung Formation, Myanmar, Late Eocene (Bartonian)
        - Allaeochelys parayrei Noulet, 1867 Tarn, Toulouse, France, Late Eocene (Bartonian)
        - Allaeochelys liliae Carbot-Chanona et al. 2020 Mazantic Shale, Chiapas, Mexico, Early Miocene (Aquitanian)
        - Allaeochelys meylani (Rollot, 2025) Moghra Formation, Egypt, Miocene (Burdigalian)
        - Allaeochelys rouzilhacensis (Godinot, 2018) Aude, France, Early Eocene (Ypresian)
      - Carettochelys Ramsay, 1886
        - Carettochelys insculpta Ramsay, 1886 Northern Australia, New Guinea, Recent
        - Carettochelys niahensis White et al. 2023 Borneo, Neogene
      - Indeterminate carettochelyids are also known from the uppermost Miocene to lowermost Pliocene of Victoria, Australia, As well as the Upper Miocene of New Guinea.

Cladogram after Kim et al. 2025.

- Carettochelyidae
  - - †Byeoljubuchelys yeosuensis
    - - †Kizylkumemys khoratensis
      - - †Kizylkumemys schultzi
        - - †Anosteira
            - - Anosteira pulchra
              - Anosteira ornata
            - - Anosteira manchuriana
              - - Anosteira maomingensis
                - Anosteira mongoliensis
          - †Allaeochelys + Carettochelys
            - - †Allaeochelys lingnanica
              - - †Allaeochelys delheidi
                - - †Allaeochelys crassesculpta
                  - - †Allaeochelys magnifica
                    - - †Allaeochelys parayrei
                      - - †Allaeochelys liliae
                        - - †Allaeochelys libyca
                          - Carettochelys insculpta (pig-nosed turtle)
