= Tsagansaurus =

Tsagansaurus Temporal range: Thanetian

Scientific classification
- Kingdom: Animalia
- Phylum: Chordata
- Class: Reptilia
- Order: Squamata
- Suborder: Anguimorpha
- Family: †Parasaniwidae
- Genus: †Tsagansaurus
- Species: †T. nemegetensis

Binomial name
- †Tsagansaurus nemegetensis Alifanov, 2018

Extinct genus of parasaniwid lizard

Tsagansaurus is an extinct monotypic genus of parasaniwid lizard that lived in Mongolia during the Thanetian stage of the Palaeocene epoch.

== Etymology ==
The generic name Tsagansaurus references Tsagan Hushu, the type locality of the taxon. The specific epithet of the type species, Tsagansaurus nemegetensis, references the Nemegetu Ridge.
