= Proneusticosaurus =

Proneusticosaurus Temporal range: Anisian

Scientific classification
- Domain: Eukaryota
- Kingdom: Animalia
- Phylum: Chordata
- Class: Reptilia
- Superorder: †Sauropterygia
- Genus: †Proneusticosaurus
- Species: †P. silesiacus

Binomial name
- †Proneusticosaurus silesiacus Volz, 1902

Extinct genus of reptiles

Proneusticosaurus is an extinct genus of basal eosauropterygian that lived during the Anisian stage of the Middle Triassic epoch.

== Palaeobiology ==
Proneusticosaurus silesiacus had a slow growth rate and lived in shallow marine environments.
