= Xiaophis =

Xiaophis Temporal range: Cenomanian

Scientific classification
- Kingdom: Animalia
- Phylum: Chordata
- Class: Reptilia
- Order: Squamata
- Suborder: Serpentes
- Genus: †Xiaophis; Xing et al., 2018

Extinct genus of snake

Xiaophis is an extinct genus of snake from the Cenomanian-aged Burmese amber deposits of Myanmar. It is known from a single species, X. myanmarensis, and is notable for being described from embryonic or neonatal remains.
