= Oliver Hawlitschek =

German zoologist

- Born: 25 July 1981 (age 45); Amberg, Germany
- Education: LMU Munich
- Known for: Taxonomy, phylogenetics, species delimitation, conservation biology
- Scientific career
- Fields: Zoology, evolutionary biology, taxonomy, herpetology, entomology
- Workplaces: University of Zurich; Leibniz Institute for the Analysis of Biodiversity Change; Bavarian State Collection of Zoology

Oliver Hawlitschek (born 25 July 1981) is a German zoologist and herpetologist whose research focuses on evolutionary biology, taxonomy, phylogenetics, species delimitation, biogeography, and conservation biology. He is a lecturer for biodiversity of invertebrates and an independent group leader in the Department of Evolutionary Biology and Environmental Studies at the University of Zurich in Switzerland. His research includes invertebrates, particularly grasshoppers and related insects, as well as reptiles and amphibians of the Comoros and other islands of the western Indian Ocean.

Hawlitschek has contributed to the description and revision of numerous animal taxa and has published research using morphological, molecular and genomic data to investigate species boundaries and evolutionary relationships. According to Wikispecies, he has been credited as an author or co-author of more than 50 taxon names.

== Early life and education ==
Hawlitschek was born on 25 July 1981 in Amberg, Germany. He studied biology at LMU Munich from 2002 to 2008, completing a diploma in biology. His diploma thesis concerned the reptiles and amphibians of the Comoros and used an integrative approach involving zoological systematics and remote sensing.

He subsequently completed doctoral research at LMU Munich on speciation and species delimitation in insular and continental systems, with particular emphasis on the Comoros Islands and Australia. His doctoral research was supervised by Gerhard Haszprunar, Frank Glaw and Michael Balke.

== Career ==
From 2015 to 2017, Hawlitschek was a postdoctoral researcher at the Institut de Biologia Evolutiva, a joint institute of the Spanish National Research Council and Pompeu Fabra University in Barcelona. From 2017 to 2019, he was a postdoctoral researcher at the Bavarian State Collection of Zoology in Munich, where he worked within the DFG TaxonOMICS framework.

From 2019 to 2023, Hawlitschek was head of the molecular genetic laboratory at the University of Hamburg's Centrum für Naturkunde. Since 2021, the institution has been part of the Leibniz Institute for the Analysis of Biodiversity Change.

In 2023, Hawlitschek joined the University of Zurich as a lecturer for biodiversity of invertebrates. He is also an independent group leader in the Department of Evolutionary Biology and Environmental Studies, where he leads the research group Phylogenetic Systematics of Animals.

== Research ==
Hawlitschek's research is focused on understanding animal diversity, evolutionary relationships and the boundaries between species. His work combines traditional approaches in systematics with molecular and genomic techniques.

His research interests include species concepts, species delimitation, herpetology, entomology, taxonomy, phylogenetics, phylogenomics, and conservation biology.

At the University of Zurich, his research group investigates animals from both island and continental systems. Its work includes the systematics and taxonomy of grasshoppers and bushcrickets, the evolution of courtship and song in grasshoppers, the systematics of phasmids in the Malagasy region, and conservation genomics of reptiles from the Comoros.

== Research in the Comoros ==
A significant part of Hawlitschek's research has concerned the Comoros archipelago in the western Indian Ocean. His work in the region has investigated the taxonomy, phylogenetics and biogeography of reptiles and amphibians.

His research has contributed to the recognition of previously overlooked diversity in the Comoros and neighbouring islands. In 2016, he was a co-author of a study that resurrected the Comoran fish scale gecko, Geckolepis humbloti, using morphological and molecular evidence.

In 2018, Hawlitschek was involved in the description of Ebenavia tuelinae, a gecko species endemic to Mayotte.

== Taxonomic work ==
Hawlitschek has participated in the description, revision and reassessment of animal species across several groups. His work has included reptiles, amphibians, beetles, grasshoppers, crickets and other invertebrates.

His publications include taxonomic studies based on combinations of external morphology, osteology, DNA sequencing, DNA barcoding, phylogenetic analysis and micro-computed tomography. He has also worked on computational approaches to species delimitation.

Among his publications is a 2009 revision of the Australasian species of the diving beetle genus Neobidessodes, carried out with Lars Hendrich and Michael Balke. The study integrated morphology, DNA taxonomy and phylogenetic data.

== Publications ==
Hawlitschek has published research in journals covering taxonomy, evolutionary biology, molecular ecology, biodiversity and conservation. His publications include work on reptiles and amphibians, insects and molecular approaches to species identification and delimitation.

Selected publications include:

- Hendrich, L., Hawlitschek, O. & Balke, M. (2009). "The epigean Australasian species of Neobidessodes gen. n. diving beetles – a revision integrating morphology, cybertaxonomy, DNA taxonomy and phylogeny". Zootaxa 2288: 1–41.
- Hájek, J., Hendrich, L., Hawlitschek, O. & Balke, M. (2010). "Copelatus sibelaemontis sp. nov. (Coleoptera: Dytiscidae) from the Moluccas with generic assignment based on morphology and DNA sequence data". Acta Entomologica Musei Nationalis Pragae 50(2): 437–443.
- Hawlitschek, O., Scherz, M. D., Straube, N. & Glaw, F. (2016). "Resurrection of the Comoran fish scale gecko Geckolepis humbloti Vaillant, 1887 reveals a disjunct distribution caused by natural overseas dispersal". Organisms Diversity & Evolution 16: 289–298.
- Hawlitschek, O., Scherz, M. D., Ruthensteiner, B., Crottini, A. & Glaw, F. (2018). "Computational molecular species delimitation and taxonomic revision of the gecko genus Ebenavia Boettger, 1878". The Science of Nature 105: 49.
- Hawlitschek, O. et al. (2021). "Morphological, osteological, and genetic data support a new species of Madatyphlops (Serpentes: Typhlopidae) endemic to Mayotte Island, Comoros Archipelago". The Anatomical Record 304: 2249–2263.

== See also ==
- Herpetology
- Entomology
- Taxonomy (biology)
- Phylogenetics
- Species delimitation
- Biodiversity
- Comoros
- University of Zurich
