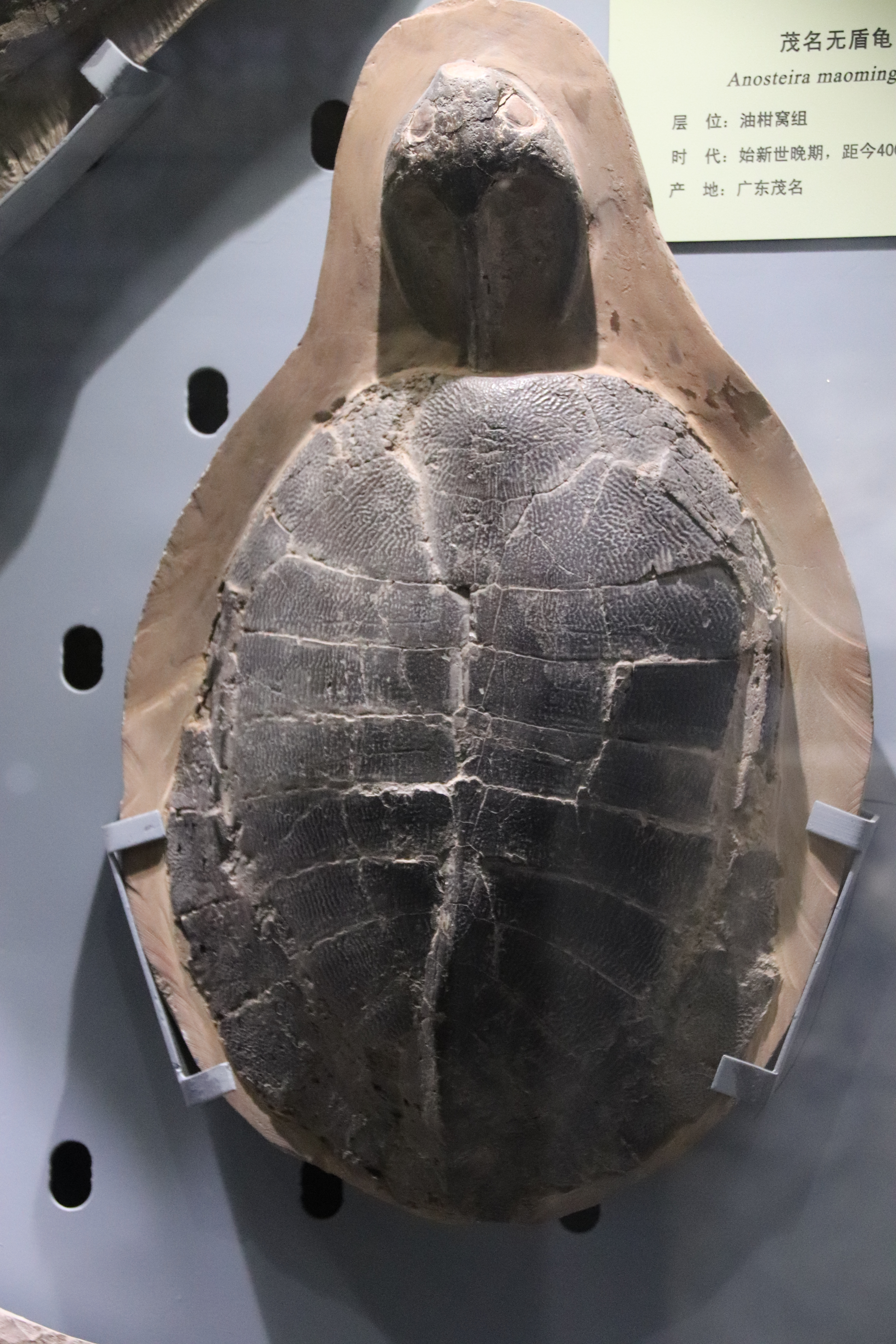
- A. maomingensis

Scientific classification
- Kingdom: Animalia
- Phylum: Chordata
- Class: Reptilia
- Order: Testudines
- Suborder: Cryptodira
- Family: Carettochelyidae
- Subfamily: †Anosteirinae
- Genus: †Anosteira; Leidy, 1871

= Anosteira =

Anosteira Temporal range: Eocene-Oligocene

Extinct genus of turtles

Anosteira is an extinct genus of carettochelyid turtle from the Eocene to the Oligocene of Asia and North America.

== Taxonomy ==
After

- Anosteira manchuriana Zangerl, 1947 Liaoning, China, late Eocene
- Anosteira maomingensis Chow and Liu, 1955 Youkanwo Formation, Guangdong, China, Late Eocene
- Anosteira mongoliensis Gilmore, 1931 Inner Mongolia, China, Late Eocene-Oligocene
- Anosteira ornata Leidy, 1871 Bridger Formation, Wyoming, USA, Early Eocene
- Anosteira pulchra (Clark, 1932) Uinta Formation, Utah, USA, Middle Eocene (Lutetian)

== Sources ==
- The Osteology of the Reptiles by Alfred Sherwood Romer
- Chinese Fossil Vertebrates by Spencer G. Lucas
- The Age of Dinosaurs in Russia and Mongolia by Michael J. Benton, Mikhail A. Shishkin, David M. Unwin, and Evgenii N. Kurochkin. p. 344.
