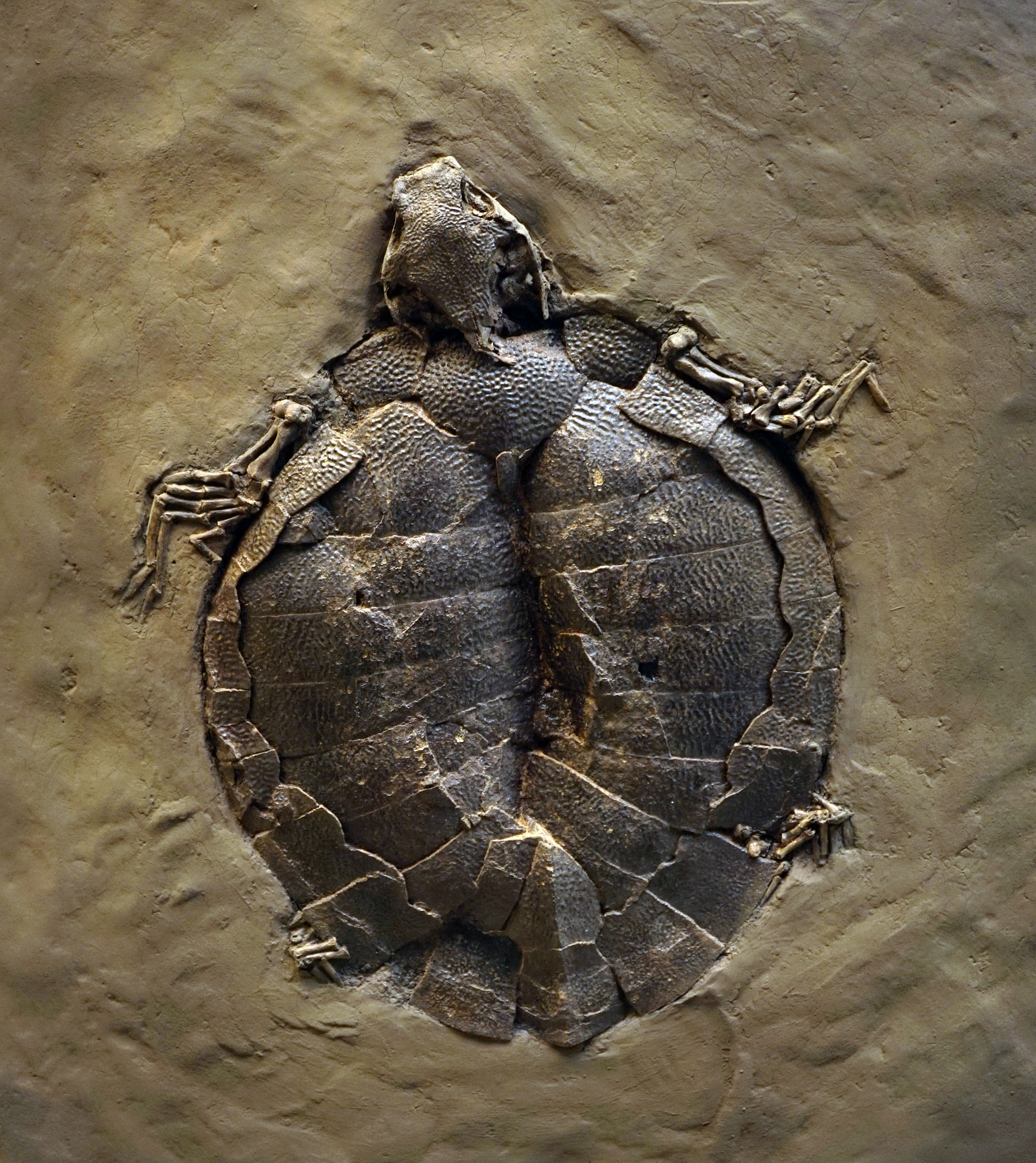
- Allaeochelys crassesculptata

Scientific classification
- Kingdom: Animalia
- Phylum: Chordata
- Class: Reptilia
- Order: Testudines
- Suborder: Cryptodira
- Family: Carettochelyidae
- Tribe: †Allaeochelyini
- Genus: †Allaeochelys; Noulet, 1867

Type species
- Allaeochelys parayrei Noulet, 1867

Species
- See Taxonomy section

= Allaeochelys =

Allaeochelys Temporal range: Eocene–Miocene

Extinct genus of turtles

Allaeochelys is an extinct genus of carettochelyid turtle, known from the Eocene to Miocene of Europe, Asia, North America and Africa.

Fossils of the species Allaeochelys crassesculpta have been found in the Messel Pit near Darmstadt, Germany in pairs fossilised in the coital position.

It is believed to be the only example in the fossil record of vertebrates mating.

Dr Walter Joyce of the University of Tübingen said that "We've demonstrated quite clearly that each pair is a male and a female, and not, for example, just two males that might have died in combat....People had long speculated they might have died while mating, but that's quite different from actually showing it."

== Taxonomy ==
After

- Allaeochelys crassesculpta (Harrassowitz, 1922) Messel Pit, Germany, Early Eocene
- Allaeochelys delheidi (Dollo, 1886) Brussels Formation, Belgium, Zamora, Spain, Early Eocene Headon Hill Formation, England, Late Eocene (Priabonian)
- Allaeochelys libyca Havlik et al., 2014, Al Wahat District, Libya, middle Miocene (Langhian)
- Allaeochelys lingnanica (Young and Chow, 1962) Shaoguan, Guangdong, China early Paleogene (possibly Paleocene)
- Allaeochelys magnifica (Hutchison et al., 2004) Pandaung Formation, Myanmar, Late Eocene (Bartonian)
- Allaeochelys meylani (Rollot, 2025) Moghra Formation, Egypt, Miocene (Burdigalian)
- Allaeochelys parayrei Noulet, 1867 Tarn, Toulouse, France, Late Eocene (Bartonian)
- Allaeochelys liliae Carbot-Chanona et al. 2020 Mazantic Shale, Chiapas, Mexico, Early Miocene (Aquitanian)
- Allaeochelys rouzilhacensis Godinot, 2018 Aude, France, Early Eocene (Ypresian)
