= Antelope Valley (Lander County) =

Valley in Nevada, United States

- Location within Nevada
- Length: 25 mi (40 km)
- Width: 8 mi (13 km)

Geography
- Country: United States
- State: Nevada
- Region: Humboldt River Basin
- District: Lander County
- Population center: Austin
- Borders on: List: Augusta Mountains; Fish Creek Mountains; New Pass Range; Ravenswood Mountain; Shoshone Range
- Coordinates: 39.8858°N 117.3284°W
- Interactive map of Antelope Valley

The Antelope Valley of west Lander County is a small, 25 mile (40 km) long, mostly arid valley in central Nevada, USA. A fourth valley of the same name Antelope Valley lies in southern Eureka County, east of the Monitor Range. The Lander County valley lies south of the Humboldt River and with Antelope Creek, is a western tributary valley to the north-flowing Reese River.

A much larger valley, of the same name in Elko and White Pine Counties, is a north-south valley surrounded by five mountain ranges, and lies on the east perimeter of the Antelope Range. A third valley that shares the name, lies in Douglas County and extends into California.

== Description ==
Antelope Valley was so named on account of antelope which once roamed the area.

Antelope Valley is short, about 25 mi long, north-to-south, but curves slightly northeast. Antelope Creek flows through the valley north, its origins in the south where two mountain ranges merge, the New Pass Range southwest, and Ravenswood Mountain (Range), southeast.

Antelope Creek disappears in flatlands in the northern third of the valley, where the valley widens somewhat, as the narrow and short, western perimeter Augusta Mountains turn slightly northwestwards. A separate creek originates from the flatland in the valley's north, Cain Creek and traverses about 12 mi northeast to the Reese River. A separate south-flowing creek flows into the Cain Creek headwaters (flatlands), the Cottonwood Creek from the southern, and central Fish Creek Mountains.

The center-east of the valley is adjacent Antelope Butte, on a small separated ridge in the foothills from the northwest of Ravenswood Mountain.

== Access ==
The shortest access to Antelope Valley is made from the south, Nevada Route 305, from Austin, Nevada. The route parallels the Reese River and the valley's north end lies about 40 mi north of Austin, then 10 mi west on unimproved roads. The south of the valley can be reached only 10 mi north of Austin, but then west of the southern perimeter of the Ravenswood Mountain region foothills, and the origin of the north-flowing Antelope Creek, also on unimproved roads.
