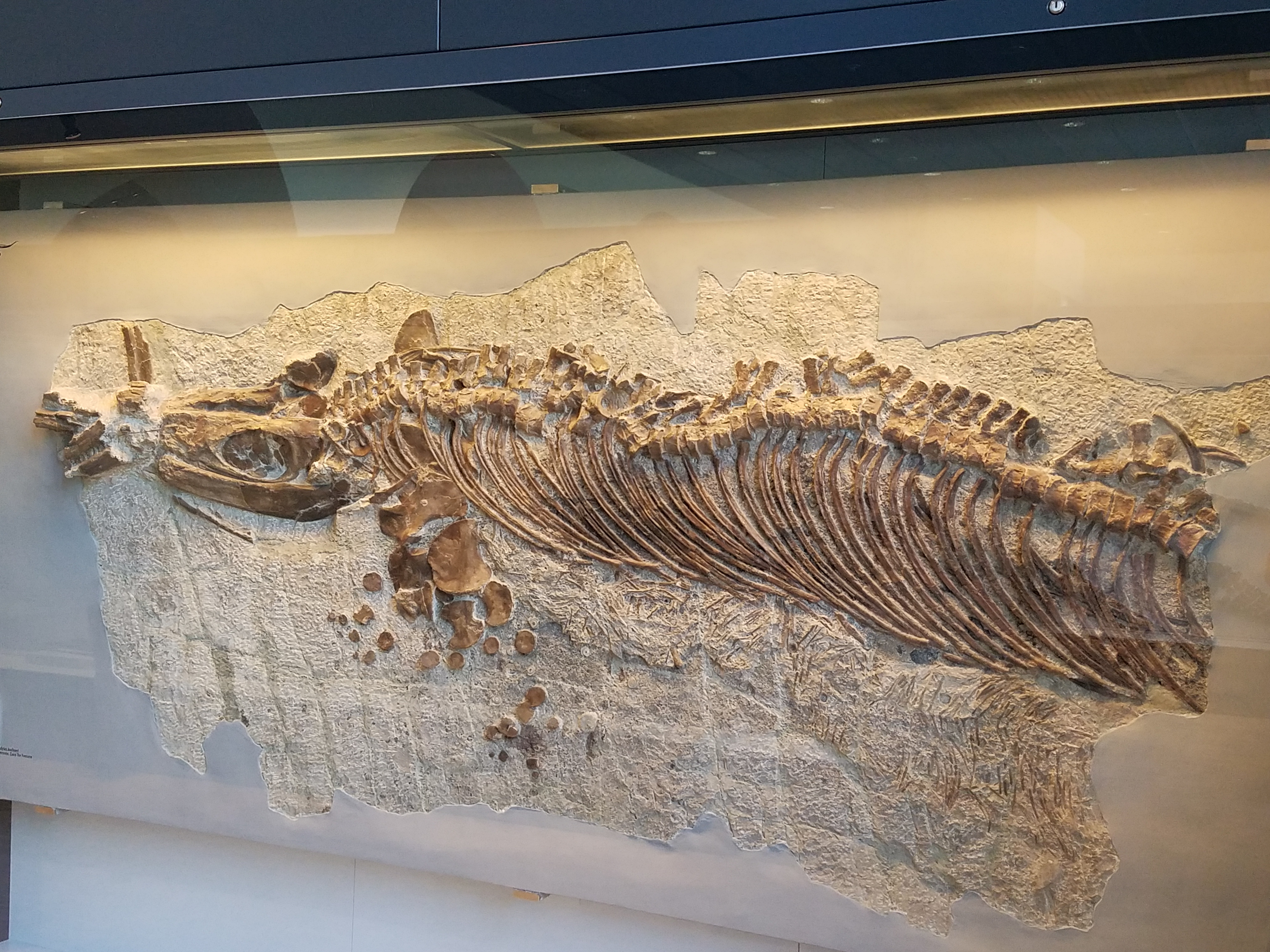
- Partial holotype skeleton of C. buchseri (PIMUZ T 4351), on display at the Natural History Museum of the University of Zurich.

Scientific classification
- Kingdom: Animalia
- Phylum: Chordata
- Class: Reptilia
- Order: †Ichthyosauria
- Family: †Cymbospondylidae
- Genus: †Cymbospondylus; Leidy, 1868

Type species
- †Cymbospondylus piscosus nomen dubium Leidy, 1868

Other species
- List: †C. petrinus Leidy, 1868; †C. buchseri Sander, 1989; †C. nichollsi Fröbisch et al., 2006; †C. duelferi Klein et al., 2020; †C. youngorum Sander et al., 2021

Synonyms
- List of synonyms: Synonyms of genus; Chonespondylus Leidy, 1868 Synonyms of C. petrinus; Chonespondylus grandis Leidy, 1868; Cymbospondylus (?) grandis (Leidy, 1868) Merriam, 1902

= Cymbospondylus =

Cymbospondylus Temporal range: Olenekian-Anisian ~251–242 Ma

Extinct genus of reptiles

Cymbospondylus (meaning "cupped vertebrae") is an extinct genus of large ichthyosaurs, of which it is among the oldest representatives, that lived from the Lower to Middle Triassic in what are now North America and Europe. The first known fossils of this taxon are a set of more or less complete vertebrae which were discovered in the 19th century in various mountain ranges of Nevada, in the United States, before being named and described by Joseph Leidy in 1868. It is in the beginning of the 20th century that more complete fossils were discovered through several expeditions to the Fossil Hill Member launched by the University of California, and described in more detail by John Campbell Merriam in 1908, thus visualizing the overall anatomy of the animal. While many species have been assigned to the genus, only five are recognized as valid, the others being considered synonymous, doubtful or belonging to other genera. Cymbospondylus was formerly classified as a representative of the Shastasauridae, but more recent studies consider it to be more basal, view as the type genus of the Cymbospondylidae.

As an ichthyosaur, Cymbospondylus had flippers for limbs and a fin on the tail. Like other non-parvipelvian ichthyosaurs, Cymbospondylus has a very slender profile, unlike later ichthyosaurs which have a morphology similar to those of dolphins. The different species of Cymbospondylus vary greatly in size, with the smallest reaching around 4 to 5 metres (13 to 16 ft) in length. The largest known species, C. youngorum, is estimated over 17 metres (56 ft) long, making Cymbospondylus one of the largest ichthyosaurs identified to date, but also one of the largest animals known of its time. The animal has a skull with a long, thin snout, proportionally small eye sockets, an elongated trunk, and a less pronounced tail than in later ichthyosaurs. The teeth are conical and pointed, having longitudinal ridges, indicating a diet of fishes and cephalopods, and possibly other marine reptiles for larger species.

Unlike cetaceans, Triassic ichthyosaurs like Cymbospondylus show that they reached large sizes very quickly after their appearance, probably because of the adaptive radiation of their prey, conodonts and ammonites, after the Permian–Triassic extinction. The size of ichthyosaurs began to decrease later, notably due to the increase in the size of their eyes, which were very useful for spotting prey. All established species of Cymbospondylus are known from the fossil records of Nevada and Switzerland, with referred specimens without specific affiliations having nevertheless been discovered in Idaho, the rest of the Alps and Spitsbergen, an island in Norway. The formations where the recognized species were discovered show that Cymbospondylus lived in marine ecosystems alongside molluscs like bivalves and ammonites, bony fishes like Saurichthys and coelacanths, cartilaginous fishes like hybodonts, and marine reptiles like sauropterygians and other ichthyosaurs. The different ichthyosaurs from these localities would have used different feeding strategies to avoid competition.

== Research history ==
=== Discovery and identification ===
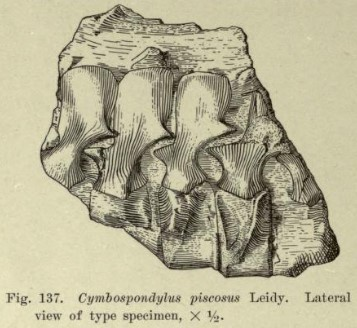
Holotype block of C. piscosus.

In 1868, American paleontologist Joseph Leidy described two new genera of ichthyosaurs dating from the Middle Triassic on the basis of fossil vertebrae discovered in several localities in Nevada, United States, all of which were transmitted through the geologist Josiah Dwight Whitney. One of the two genera he named is Cymbospondylus, to which he assigned two species. The first one is C. piscosus, which Leidy named on the basis of several more or less complete vertebrae having been discovered in different mountain ranges of the state. The holotype of C. piscosus is a block containing five incomplete dorsal vertebrae that was discovered in the New Pass Range, northwest of the city of Austin. (Note: Leidy gives a slightly different description of the holotype in his 1868 paper, stating that it had only four dorsal vertebrae, due to the preservation of the fossil block.) Leidy attributes two other specimens to the species, one being a series of eight caudal vertebrae discovered at Star Canyon in the Humboldt Range, and the other being a single vertebra, probably also caudal, discovered in the Toiyabe Range, in the Reese River, northeast of Austin. The second species is C. petrinus, named from five large dorsal vertebrae discovered in the Humboldt Range. The genus name Cymbospondylus derives from the Ancient Greek words κύμβη (kymbē, "cup") and σπόνδυλος (spondylos, "vertebra"), all taken together literally meaning cupped vertebrae, in reference to the rather obvious shape of this part of the skeleton. As no type species was designated in the 1868 article, it was not until 1902 that John Campbell Merriam assigned C. piscosus to this title, the latter being the first named in Leidy's official description of the genus.

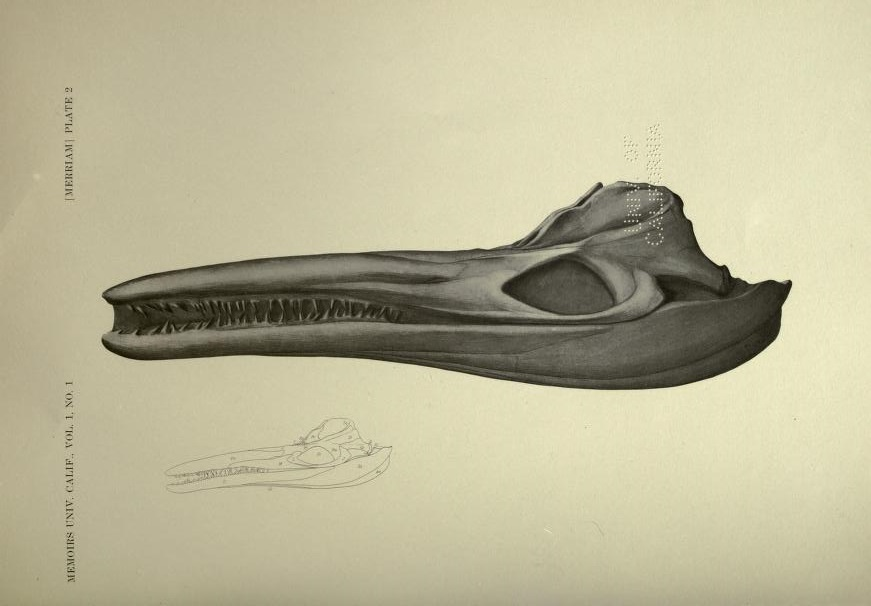
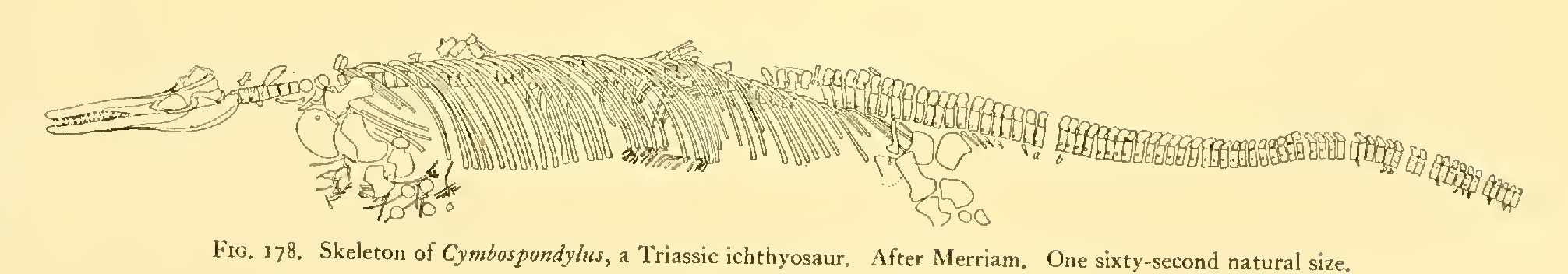
Sketches representing the skull and fossil skeleton of UCMP 9950, one of the specimens of C. petrinus having been discovered during expeditions led by the University of California at the beginning of the 20th century

Between 1901 and 1907, the University of California sent ten expeditions across different corners of the United States to recover as many ichthyosaur fossils as possible dating from the Triassic, in order to be analyzed in more detail. These same expeditions were led by Merriam and were almost all financed by Annie Montague Alexander. The research finally collected more than fifty specimens, each preserving a significant portion of their skeletons. Among these fossils are several specimens of excellent quality from C. petrinus, including an almost complete skeleton, cataloged as UCMP 9950, all discovered in the origin locality mentioned by Leidy. Like the other ichthyosaurs mentioned in the work, Merriam describes the taxon in more depth based on new known fossil material. Merriam's anatomical descriptions of C. petrinus are still recognized as viable, and are even used in comparative anatomy in later studies of the genus Cymbospondylus, thus lending validity to the species.

Unlike C. petrinus, no additional fossils of the type species C. piscosus have been discovered. In Merriam's works, the latter recognized C. piscosus as distinct on the basis of its smaller size and by the regularly concave faces of the vertebrae of the holotype specimen. Only later did the validity of C. piscosus begin to be questioned, with authors mentioning the questionable nature of the fossils. In their work published in 2003, Christopher McGowan and Ryosuke Motani assert that the fossil vertebrae attributed to C. piscosus do not present distinctive characteristics to prove its validity. This would therefore pose a taxonomic problem, because if the type species turns out to be a nomen dubium, the genus to which it is classified will also be. To try to resolve this problem, the two authors suggest that the most complete known skeleton of C. petrinus (UCMP 9950) could be designated as a neotype of C. piscosus. However, as no formal ICZN appeal has been established to date, the name C. petrinus for the proposed neotype should be retained until further notice. Therefore, C. piscosus is not included in most descriptions of the genus, although it is still recognized as the type species.

=== Recognized species ===
In 1927, a partial skeleton of a large ichthyosaur was discovered in the Grenzbitumenzone Member at the Monte San Giorgio fossil site in Switzerland and was mentioned by Bernhard Peyer in 1944. Twenty years later, in 1964, Emil Kuhn-Schnyder published a photo of this same specimen and suggested that it shared affinities with Cymbospondylus, then only known from North America at that time. The specimen in question, cataloged as PIMUZ T 4351, was formally described for the first time in 1989 under the name C. buchseri by Paul Martin Sander, thus confirming the presence of the genus in Europe. The specific epithet buchseri is named in honor of Fritz Buchser, a member of the Museum of Paleontology at the University of Zurich, the latter having prepared the holotype skeleton in 1931 as his first major professional achievement.

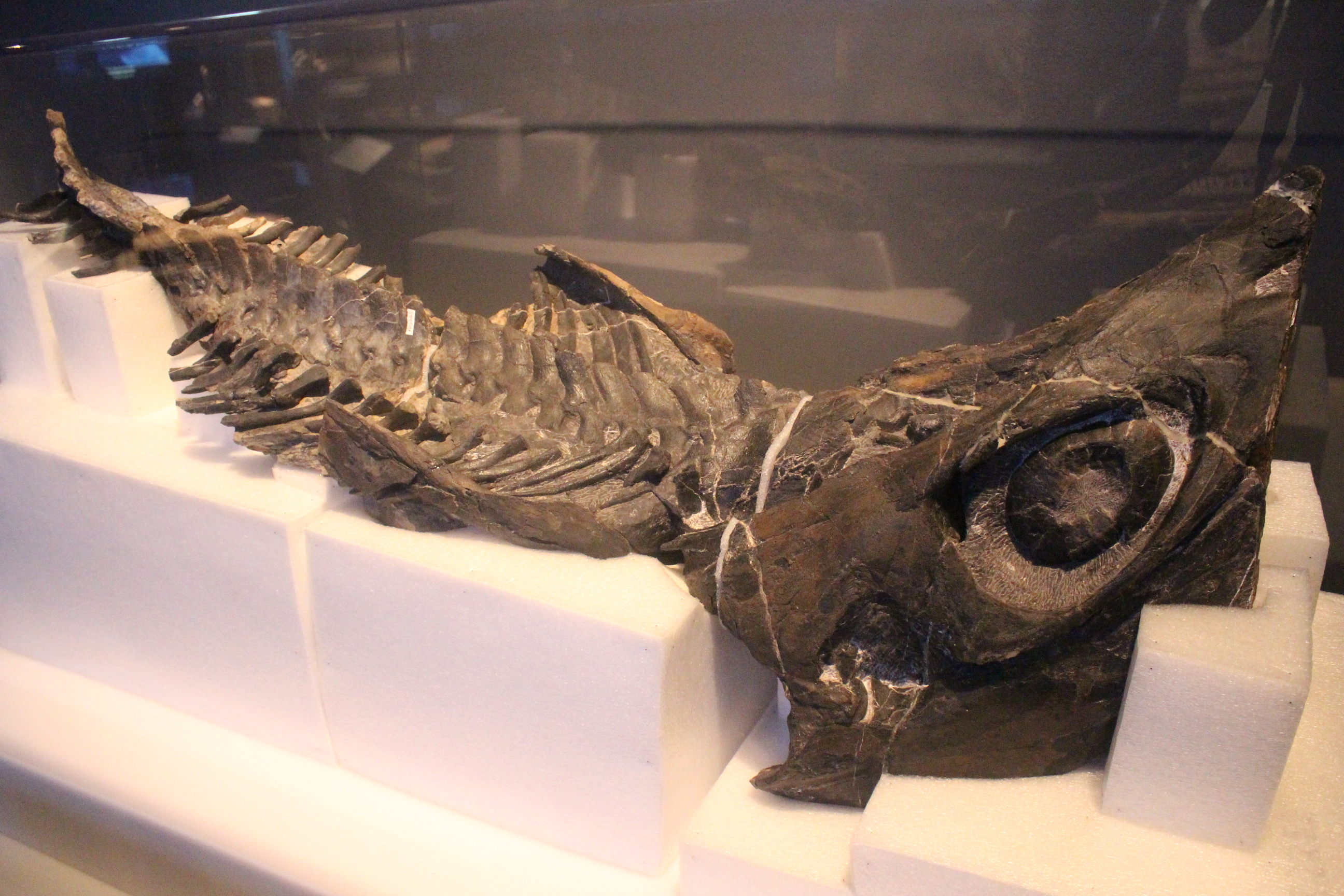
Partial holotype skeleton of C. nichollsi (FMNH PR 2251), on display at the Field Museum, Chicago

While C. petrinus was for a time seen as the only valid species of the genus known from Nevada, it was not until the early 21st century that later discoveries contradicted this assertion. In 2006, Nadia Fröbisch and colleagues described the species C. nichollsi based on an incomplete skeleton, cataloged as FMNH PR 2251, which was discovered in the Augusta Mountains. The fossil was originally exhumed in the hope of finding a new specimen of C. petrinus, but the number of significant anatomical differences led researchers to establish a separate species. The species in question is named in honor to Elizabeth Nicholls, an American-Canadian paleontologist specializing in Triassic marine reptiles, who made a major contribution to the ichthyosaurs that lived during this period. In their description, Fröbisch and his colleagues consider that an almost complete skull attributed to C. petrinus, cataloged as UCMP 9913, (Note: This specimen is one of the several additional C. petrinus fossils described by Meriam in 1908.) could in fact belong to C. nichollsi, because it presents similar characteristics. However, as the specimen has been relatively little described in the scientific literature, the authors do not know whether it would show intraspecific variations within C. petrinus, judging therefore that a more in-depth description is necessary. Subsequent studies carried out on the genus Cymbospondylus nevertheless always refer specimen UCMP 9913 to C. petrinus, but still mentioning some notable differences.

In 2011, a notable new Cymbospondylus fossil was also discovered in the Augusta Mountains, then exhumed three years later in 2014. This discovery was a partial skeleton that was briefly mentioned in a 2013 in a secondary article describing the large contemporary ichthyosaur Thalattoarchon, as well as in a 2018 histological study, where it is among the specimens analyzed. However, it was only later that the specimen, cataloged as LACM DI 158109, was formally designated a holotype for the species C. duelferi by Nicole Klein and colleagues in 2020. The species name duelferi was chosen in honor of Olaf Dülfer, fossil preparer who made many practical contributions to research on Mesozoic marine reptiles.

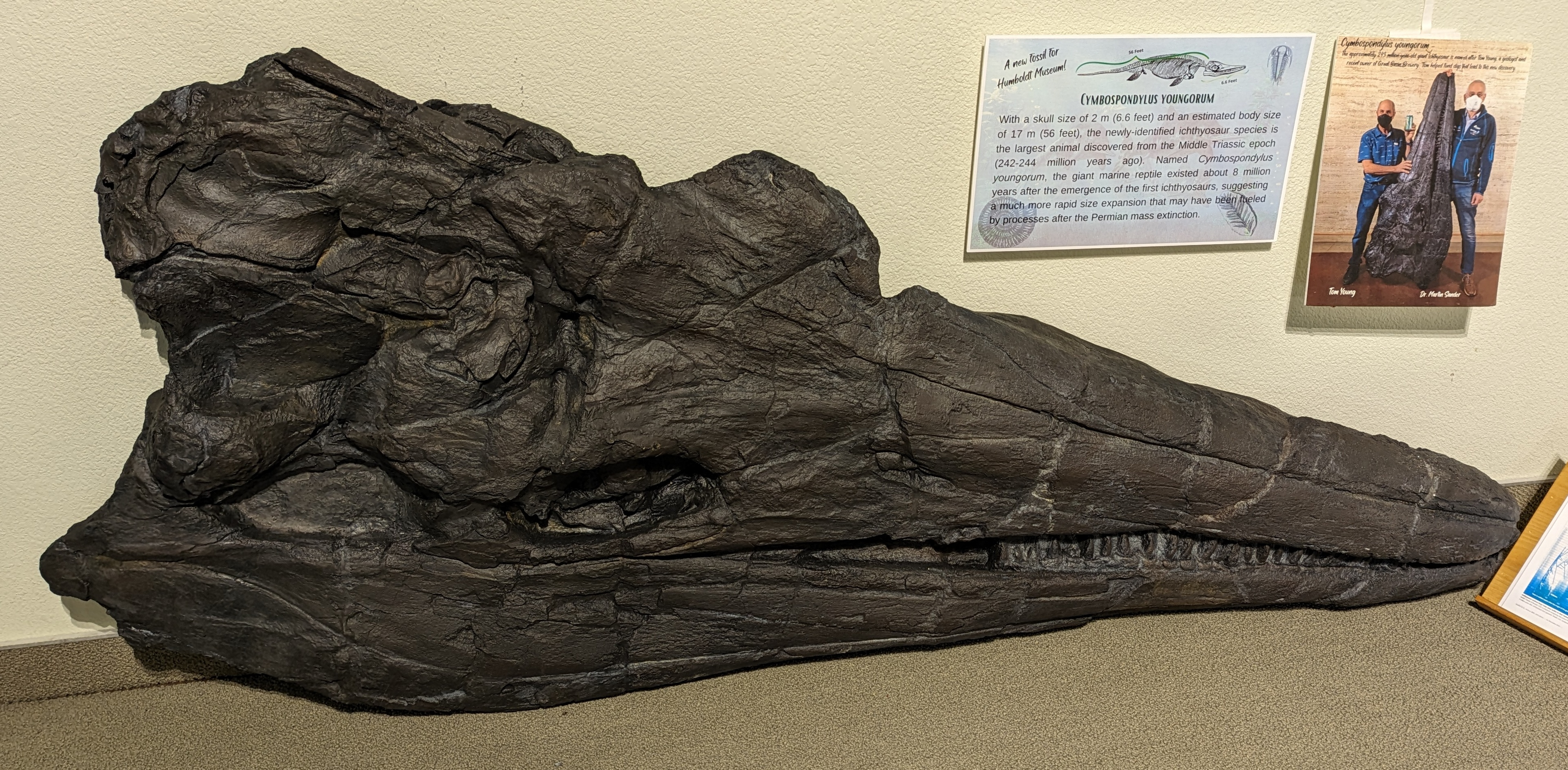
Holotype skull of C. youngorum (LACM DI 157871), on display at the Humboldt Museum in Winnemucca, Nevada.

In 1998, still in the Augusta Mountains, Sander discovered another notable specimen of Cymbospondylus, and exhumed it with his colleagues between 2014 and 2015. After preparation of the fossils, the specimen, cataloged as LACM DI 157871, consists of a large complete skull, some cervical vertebrae, the right humerus as well as fragments of the shoulder girdle. It was in 2021, one year after the identification of C. duelferi, that a new species of the genus was named from this specimen in Science by Sander and his colleagues. This species, C. youngorum, is named in honor of Tom and Bonda Young, these latter having financially supported the fossil exhumation project.

=== Specimens that may belong to the genus ===
Many other more partial specimens of Cymbospodylus have been discovered in various geological formations in Europe, but their specific attribution cannot be determined, the latter are then referred to under the name Cymbospondylus sp. in the scientific literature. Three of these specimens, including one from Idaho, and two from the Norwegian archipelago of Svalbard, are dated to the Olenekian stage of the Lower Triassic, making them the oldest known representatives of the genus. Below, the list of specimens that could potentially belong to Cymbospondylus:

- In 1980, Kuhn-Schnyder described an anterior partial skeleton of an ichthyosaur discovered at Monte Seceda, Italy. The described specimen was first referred by the author to Shastasaurus sp., before being referred to Cymbospondylus in the official description of C. buchseri by Sander in 1989, an attribution which seems to still be recognized today.
- In 1992, Sander described two specimens attributed to Cymbospondylus having been discovered in different localities of Spitsbergen, located in the Norwegian archipelago of Svalbard. The first and the better preserved of the two specimens described in the article, consists of a series of 17 vertebrae associated with ribs which was discovered in 1961 in the Botneheia mountain, being cataloged as PIMUZ A/III 496. The second consists of two isolated vertebrae, cataloged as PIMUZ A/III 554 and 555, which were both discovered in the bay of Wichebukta.
- In 1994, Judy A. Massare and Jack M. Callaway referred to a number of Cymbospondylus fossils discovered in 1985 by H. Gregory McDonald in the Platy Siltstone Member of the Thaynes Formation, in Idaho, United States.
- In 2001, Olivier Rieppel and Fabio Marco Dalla Vecchia listed a set of fossils of marine reptiles from the Triassic and having been discovered in the comune of Forni di Sotto, in Italy, including two that they attributed with doubt to Cymbospondylus. The first of these collections consists of a single vertebra, a neural spine and three rib fragments, while the second consists of two isolated vertebrae.
- In 2012, Balini and Renesto described four more or less partial vertebrae attributed to Cymbospondylus which were discovered in the comune of Piazza Brembana, in Italy, being cataloged MCSNB 11689 A, B, C, and D.
- In 2013 and 2018, numerous genus-assigned vertebrae were identified in the Vendomdalen Member of the Vikinghøgda Formation, Svalbard.
The various points on the map show the localities where Cymbospondylus fossils have been discovered: the orange points represent the recognized North American species, the red point represents C. buchseri and the turquoise points the possible other specimens of the genus

=== Formerly assigned species ===
Although many valid and distinct species have been assigned to Cymbospondylus throughout its taxonomic history, some of these have been reassigned to different genera or are considered synonymous or even doubtful. In his 1868 paper describing Cymbospondylus, Leidy also named another ichthyosaur as Chonespondylus grandis, based on a fragment of a caudal vertebra found at Star Canyon in the Humboldt Range. The genus name Chonespondylus derives from the Ancient Greek words χοάνη (khoánē, "funnel") and σπόνδυλος (spondylos, "vertebra") named in the same way as for Cymbospondylus. The specific epithet comes from the Latin grandis, meaning "large, wide". In 1902, Merriam listed Leidy's discoveries, but having found no features distinguishing Chonespondylus from Cymbospondylus, he decided to synonymize the first name with the second, under the name C. (?) grandis. In 1908, after the discovery of new very complete fossils from C. petrinus, Merriam decided to definitively synonymize C. (?) grandis with the latter.

In 1873, John Whitaker Hulke described a species of Ichthyosaurus, I. polaris, named after two sets of vertebrae associated with rib fragments that were discovered on Isfjorden, Spitsbergen, an island in Norway. In 1902, the Russian paleontologist Nikolai Nikolajewitch Yakowlew moved the species within the genus Shastasaurus, referring an isolated vertebra to this taxon. In 1908, Merriam in turn moved this species into the genus Cymbospondylus, under the name C. (?) polaris. Merriam still expresses some hesitation about this attribution, asserting that the true generic identity cannot be determined for this species due to the few known fossils. In 1910, the species was moved to the newly erected genus Pessosaurus by Carl Wiman, as P. polaris, to which it has always been referred by this name ever since. Although this taxon is declared as a nomen dubium according to studies published at the end of the 20th century, it is seen as a species inquirenda according to McGowan and Motani in 2003, i.e. a taxon under investigation, as numerous fossils that have since been referred to P. polaris could make it once again as valid.

Still in his 1908 work, Merriam erects two new species of the genus, coming from the same locality from which C. petrinus is known. The first is C. nevadanus, named from fossils constituting a hind limb. Merriam distinguishes this species from C. petrinus on the basis of its larger size and the different proportions of some bones. However, the C. nevadanus material is not sufficiently diagnostic to support the validity of this species, and is considered a species inquireda according to McGowan and Motani in 2003. The second species erected by Merriam is C. natans, which he names from an isolated humerus, to which he attributes a radius, an ulna, carpals and a series of caudal vertebrae. In his article, he notes the similarity of these bones with those of Mixosaurus, leading the author to rename the species to M (?) natans in 1911. For much of the 20th century, M (?) natans was recognized as a valid species of Mixosaurus until 1999, when it was synonymized with M. nordenskioeldii. Although M. nordenskioeldii itself has been considered a nomen dubium since 2005, the fossil material concerned remains attributed to the family Mixosauridae and is no longer attributable to Cymbospondylus.

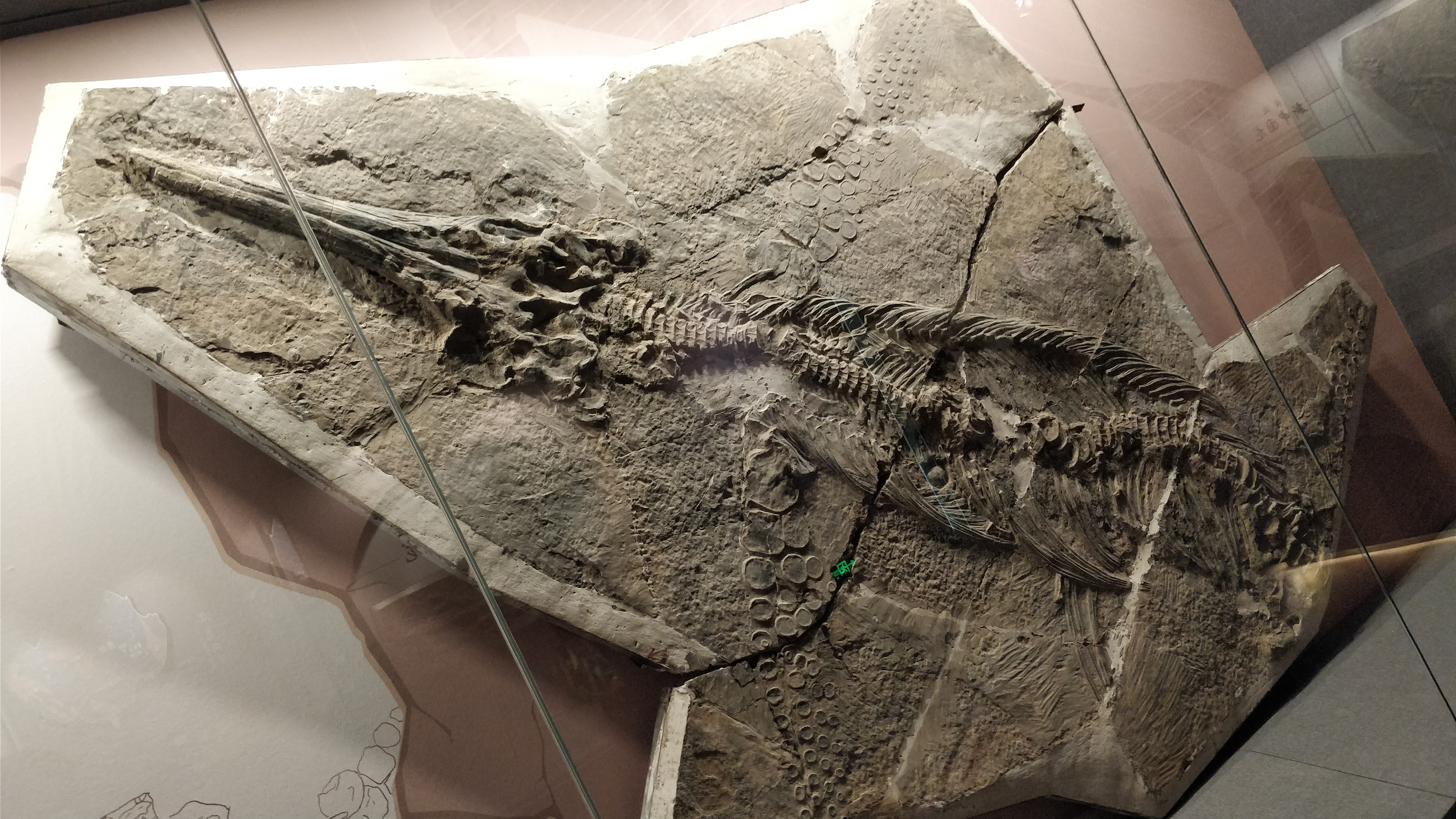
Fossil skeleton of Guizhouichthyosaurus exhibited at the Geological Museum of Guizhou, China, to which one of the specimens belonging to this genus was assigned to Cymbospondylus

In a review of German ichthyosaurs published in 1916, Friedrich von Huene described two other species of Cymbospondylus whose fossils were discovered in the Muschelkalk of the town of Laufenburg in the state of Baden-Württemberg. The first is C. germanicus, which Huene names from a single vertebra associated with other vertebrae as well as a basioccipital. Immediately afterwards, the validity of C. germanicus was questioned the same year by Ferdinand Broili, the latter citing that the fossils concerned did not present notable features to be recognized as distinct. Additionally, the fossils appear to be very poorly preserved to be distinguished as a valid species, and is therefore a nomen dubium.

In 2002, paleontologists Chun Li and Hai-Lu You named a new species as C. asiaticus based on a complete skull discovered in the Xiaowa Formation, located in Guizhou Province, China, and it was considered as the most recent known representative of the genus. In the official description of C. nichollsi published in 2006, the authors are doubtful regarding the attribution of this species to Cymbospondylus. They mention that the latter does not share any notable commonalities with the three then recognized species of the genus at the time, namely C. petrinus, C. buchseri and C. nichollsi, and suggest that it would in fact be a junior synonym of Guizhouichthyosaurus tangae. The synonymy proposed by Fröbisch and colleagues was accepted in 2009 by Qing-Hua Shang and Li after the discovery of an almost complete skeleton of Guizhouichthyosaurus from the same formation. However, considering that Guizhouichthyosaurus is similar to Shastasaurus, they moved the species as S. tangae. This synonymy was contested the following year, in 2010, in which Michael W. Maisch provisionally reclassified Guizhouichthyosaurus as a distinct genus. In 2011, Sander and his colleagues considered that Guizhouichthyosaurus was distinct, while a 2013 study by Shang and Li still synonymizes it with Shastasaurus. However, numerous phylogenetic and morphological analyzes subsequently published consider Guizhouichthyosaurus to be distinct genus from Shastasaurus.

== Description ==
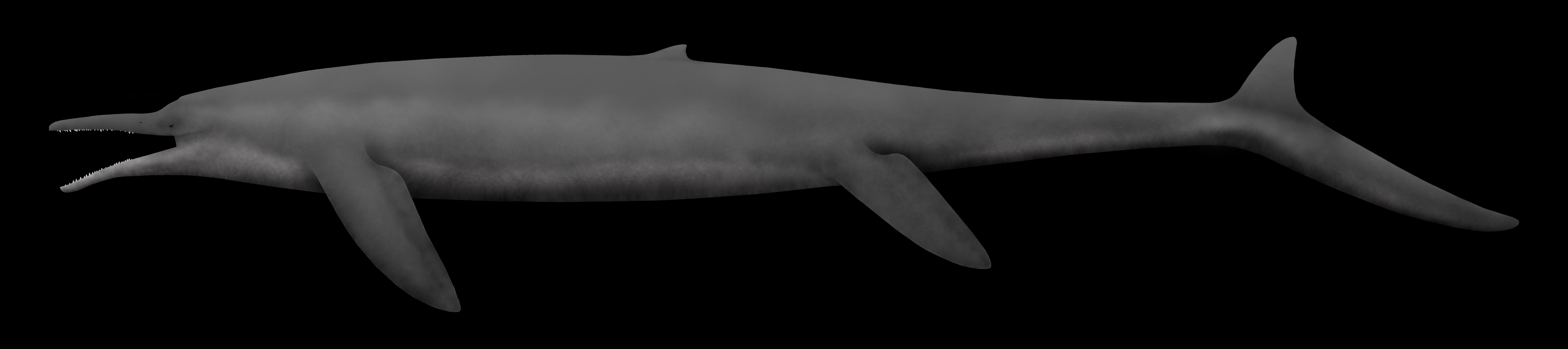
Life restoration of C. petrinus

Cymbospondylus, like other ichthyosaurs, had a long, thin snout, large eye sockets, and a tail fluke that was supported by vertebrae in the lower half. Ichthyosaurs were superficially similar to dolphins and had flippers rather than legs, but the oldest representatives (with the exception of the parvipelvians, more advanced) do not have dorsal fins, or would have one but relatively poorly developed. Like most Triassic ichthyosaurs, Cymbospondylus has a more slender anatomy, possessing an elongated trunk and a long, poorly pronounced tail, giving it a body more similar in appearance to that of an eel. Although the colour of Cymbospondylus is unknown, at least some ichthyosaurs may have been uniformly dark-coloured in life, which is evidenced by the discovery of high concentrations of eumelanin pigments in the preserved skin of an early ichthyosaur fossil.

=== Size ===
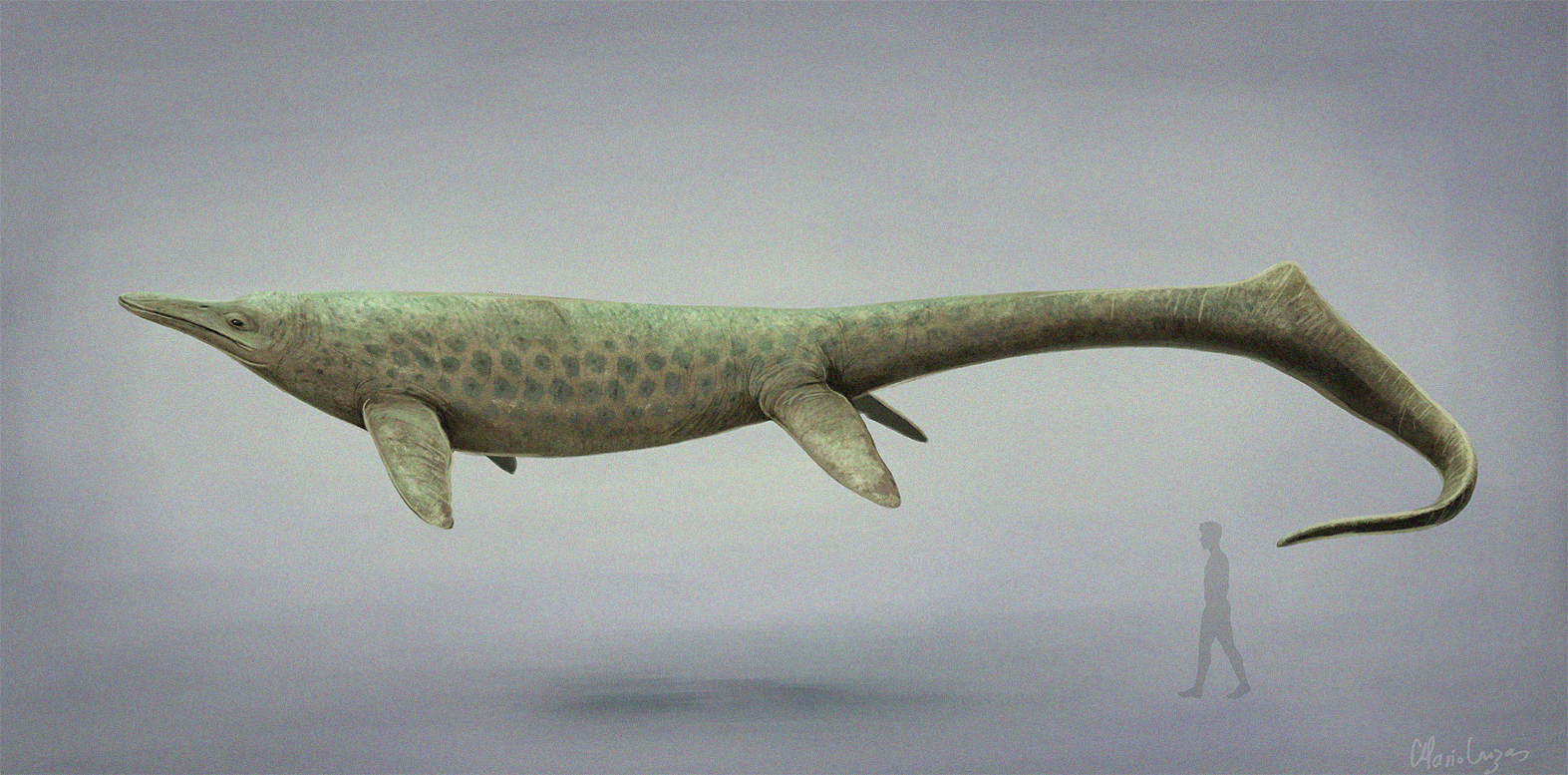
Life restoration and size comparison of a C. youngorum with a human

The size and weight of Cymbospondylus varies greatly between recognized species. Estimates of the size of C. petrinus have changed relatively little since 1908, mainly due to the almost complete skeleton of specimen UCMP 9950, considered the best known specimen of Cymbospondylus. Merriam suggests that C. petrinus would reach a size exceeding 9.1 m (360 in) in length based on specimens UCMP 9947 and 9950. In 2020, Klein and colleagues increased the size estimate of C. petrinus a little further, seeing them as reaching 9.3 m (31 ft) for a 1.16 m (3 ft 10 in) skull. In 2021, Sander and is colleagues in 2021 estimates C. petrinus to 12.56 m (41 ft 2 in) long for about 5.7 metric tons (6.3 short tons), while keeping the same cranial measurements. The explanation for the origin of this size is described in a paper published in 2024. The study explains that Sander made a further revision regarding the size of C. petrinus based on specimens UCMP 9947 and 9950, and suggested that the combination of the two gives a total of approximately 10 m (33 ft). Specimen UCMP 9947 is missing several posterior caudal vertebrae, so the increase in size to over 11 to 12 m (36 to 39 ft) long is not seen as unreasonable. The holotype specimen of C. youngorum having a skull measuring almost 2 m (6.6 ft) long and its humerus being the second largest bone of this type recorded in an ichthyosaur, the maximum size of the animal is therefore estimated at 17.65 m (57.9 ft) for a weight of 44.7 metric tons (49.3 short tons). (Note: Sander and colleagues estimate animal size based on the 95 % prediction interval in C. youngorum. Two additional estimates were also made by the team. The prediction interval less than 95 % gives a length of 12.5 m (41 ft) for a weight of 14.7 metric tons (16.2 short tons), while that which is greater than 95 % gives a length of 25 m (82 ft) for a weight of 135.8 metric tons (149.7 short tons). As estimates do not come close to 95 %, these measurements are not considered to be the probable maximum sizes of C. youngorum.) This estimate not only makes C. youngourum one of the largest ichthyosaurians identified to date behind Ichthyotitan, but also makes it one of the largest animals known of its time. The antiquity as well as such an imposing size for an animal dating from the beginning of the Middle Triassic makes C. youngorum qualify as "the first aquatic giant" according to Lene Liebe Delsett and Nicholas David Pyenson.

Estimating the size of C. nichollsi is more complex, because although the holotype specimen is known from a significant portion of the skeleton, the latter preserves only half of the skull. However, based on the comparison with C. buchseri and C. petrinus, the total length of the skull is estimated at 97 cm (3 ft 2 in) for an animal measuring 7.6 m (25 ft) long, all for a body mass of 3 metric tons (3.3 short tons). The estimated size of the C. buchseri holotype is slightly shorter, reaching a length of 5 to 5.5 m (16 to 18 ft) with a skull 68 cm (2 ft 3 in) long, although no estimate of its weight has yet been published. Possessing a skull which would measure a total of 65–70 cm (2 ft 2 in – 2 ft 4 in), C. duelferi is the smallest known species of the genus, having a size estimated at 4.3 m (14 ft) long in the study officially describing it. The measurements of the species are estimated again at around 5 m (16 ft) for a body mass of 520 kg (1,150 lb) by Sander and colleagues in 2021.

Individuals with undetermined specific attributions have also been given estimates regarding their size, although known from thinner fossil remains. Using the same measurement technique as those done for C. youngorum, a specimen cataloged as IGPB R660, known from the Vikinghøgda Formation, has an estimated size between 7.5 to 9.5 m (25 to 31 ft) long, making it the largest known ichthyosaur specimen from the Lower Triassic.

=== Skull ===
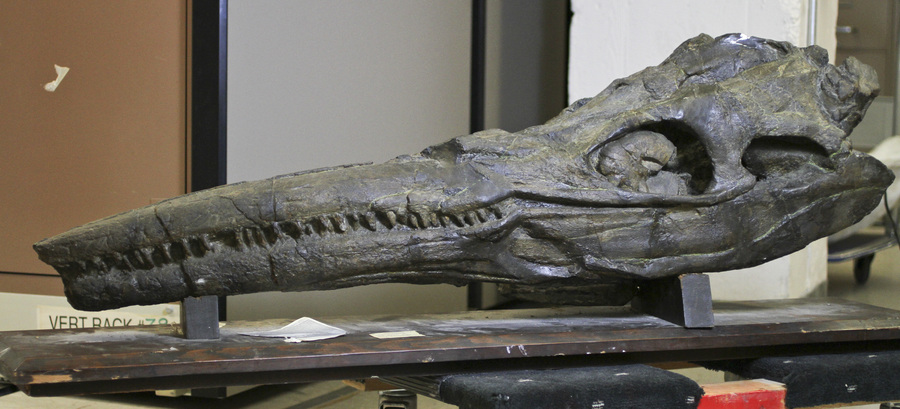
Preserved skull of C. petrinus (UCMP 9913)

Like other ichthyosaurs, the snout of Cymbospondylus is elongated into a long, conical rostrum, the largest bones of which are the premaxillae and nasal bones. The nasal bones also extend far back, and, with the frontal bones, reach the anterior edge of the temporal fenestrae. The eye sockets are oval to ovoid in shape and are proportionally small in relation to the size of the skull. The shape of the superior temporal fenestra differs between some species, being oval in C. nichollsi and C. duelferi but triangular in C. petrinus. The number of bony elements constituting the scleral rings varies between species: 12 ossicles in C. duelferi; 13 ossicles in C. buchseri; 14 ossicles in C. nichollsi; and between 14 and 18 ossicles in C. petrinus. Although a scleral ring is preserved in C. youngorum, nothing has been said about the number of ossicles constituting it in the latter. The sagittal crest is more or less pronounced in the different species, being low in C. duelferi and C. nichollsi, clearly high in C. petrinus, (Note: These observations differ according to certain specimens of C. petrinus, because this distinction of the sagittal crest is clearer in the skull of specimen UCMP 9950 than in specimen UCMP 9913.) and totally absent in C. youngorum. The occipital condyle of Cymbospondylus is concave in shape. Like other ichthyosaurs, Cymbospondylus has an elongated and thin lower jaw, extending backwards to beyond the back of the skull. The dentary, the main bone making up the lower jaw, extends almost to the level of the middle of the eye socket. The surangular also represents an important part of the mandible, and thins down to the retro-articular process. The angular bone forms the ventral part of the lateral side of the lower jaw and contacts the surangular via a long suture.

The dentition of Cymbospondylus is generally thecodont, meaning that the tooth roots are deeply cemented into the jawbone. However, not all species share the same robustness in terms of their dental implantation. C. petrinus has a particular form of thecodont dentition, its teeth appearing to be fused at the bottom of the alveoli. C. duelferi has a subthecodont type of dentition, meaning that its teeth are implanted in shallow sockets. C. youngorum has a thick base of the bone attaching to the teeth, a trait not seen in other ichthyosaurs. The teeth are homodont, that is to say they share an identical shape, being conical, ridged and pointed. The teeth also have longitudinal ridges that extend from the base of the crown to the apical third. The total number of teeth in the different species of Cymbospondylus is difficult to determine, because the state of preservation of certain fossils prevents formal evaluations from being obtained, being poorly preserved in C. buchseri, and totally unknown in C. nichollsi. Only three species were able to have a more or less clear estimate of their number of teeth: C. duelferi having a number greater than 21 teeth known in the upper jaw, but unknown in the lower jaw; C. petrinus with between 30 and 35 teeth in the upper and lower jaws; and C. youngorum having 43 teeth in the upper jaw and more than 31 teeth in the lower jaw.

== Classification ==
=== Phylogeny ===
The exact placement of Cymbospondylus within Ichthyosauria is poorly understood with its position varying between different studies, sometimes being recovered as more and sometimes as less derived than mixosaurids. However it is agreed upon that Cymbospondylus is a rather basal member of the clade. Early phylogenies placed Cymbospondylus within Shastasauridae. In the analysis of Bindellini et al. (2021), Cymbospondylus is placed at the very base of Ichthyosauria, outside the more derived members of Hueneosauria (including Mixosauridae and Shastasauridae). In the publication describing C. duelferi, Klein and colleagues recovered that all species from the Fossil Hill Member in Nevada form a clade with one another. The description of C. youngorum further supports this Nevadan clade, recovering C. youngorum as its most derived member while C. buchseri from Europe sits at the base of the genus. Much like in the analysis by Bindellini and colleagues, shastasaurids and mixosaurids were recovered as more derived ichthyosaurs.

Like in many analyses prior, the type species was not included in the dataset due to its questionable and fragmentary nature. This causes Cymbospondylus to have a very convoluted taxonomy, with it being suggested that the type species should be neglected. The 2020 study reviewed the skull morphology of C. nichollsi and found the species to be valid, as the skull morphology accords with that of C. petrinus but is distinct enough to be separate, such as the upper temporal fenestra shape being oval in C. nichollsi but triangular in C. petrinus. In their phylogenetic analysis the authors did not recover a definite placement for C. buchseri, leading them to state that further study was needed to determine whether the Swiss species belonged to the genus.

The following cladogram shows the position of Cymbospondylus within the Ichthyosauria after Sander et al., (2021):

- Ichthyosauromorpha
  - Hupehsuchus nanchangensis
  - - - Sclerocormus parviceps
      - Cartorhynchus lenticarpus
    - - Chaohusaurus chaoxianensis
      - - Chaohusaurus geishanensis
        - - Chaohusaurus zhangjiawanensis
          - - Utatsusaurus hataii
            - - Grippia longirostris
              - - Gulosaurus helmi
                - - Parvinatator wapitiensis
                  - Ichthyosauria
                    - Xinminosaurus catactes
                    - - - Pessopteryx nisseri
                        - - Cymbospondylus buchseri
                          - - Cymbospondylus nichollsi
                            - - Cymbospondylus petrinus
                              - - Cymbospondylus duelferi
                                - Cymbospondylus youngorum
                      - - Mixosauridae
                        - - Phantomosaurus neubigi
                          - - Qianichthyosaurus zhoui
                            - - Qianichthyosaurus xingyiensis
                              - Wimanius odontopalatus
                          - Merriamosauria
                            - Besanosaurus leptorhynchus
                            - - - Thalattoarchon saurophagis
                                - Shastasauridae
                              - - - - Guizhouichthyosaurus tangae
                                    - Shonisaurus popularis
                                  - Euichthyosauria

=== Evolution ===
Ichthyosaurs form one of the major groups of marine reptiles that flourished during a large part of the Mesozoic, between approximately 248 and 90 million years ago, i.e. during the end of the Lower Triassic until approximately the beginning of the Upper Cretaceous. Appearing in the early temporal stages of this group, Cymbospondylus is therefore one of the oldest representatives to have been identified to date. However, despite its age, the genus shows that certain ichthyosaurs adopted a rapid increase in size throughout their evolution. Indeed, the oldest known representatives of ichthyosauriforms (a group that includes ichthyosaurs, their ancestors and related lineages), such as Cartorhynchus, have a skull measuring 5.5 centimeters (0.18 ft) long, while the largest known species of Cymbospondylus, C. youngorum, has a skull up to about 2 meters (6.6 ft) long, and yet these two taxa are only separated by about 2.5 million years. To compare with the evolution of a group of similar tetrapods, namely the cetaceans, between Pakicetus, which has a skull width of 12.7 centimeters (0.42 ft), and Basilosaurus, to which the latter has a skull width of 60 centimeters (2.0 ft), between 10 and 14 million years ago. A similar case is also observed in the subgroup of odontocetes, because between Simocetus, which has a skull wide of 23.8 centimeters (0.78 ft), and Livyatan, which has a skull wide of approximately 2 meters (6.6 ft), approximately more than 25 million years ago. This rapid increase in size among ichthyosaurs could have been favored by the rapid diversification of conodonts and ammonites after the Permian–Triassic extinction event. The evolution of large eyes would subsequently have considerably reduced the large measurements in ichthyosaurs, because they helped better identify their source of food.

== Palaeobiology ==
Massare & Callaway (1990) propose that many Triassic ichthyosaurs including Cymbospondylus may have been ambush predators. They argue that the long neck and torso would create drag in water while the laterally-flattened tail lacking the lunate fluke of later ichthyosaur taxa was more suited for an undulating swimming style. In their research they suggest that the elongated flexible bodies of early ichthyosaurs were built to support an undulating swimming style while the powerful tail would provide bursts of speed, both of which they cite as being possible adaptations to ambush prey. Massare & Callaway put this in contrast with Jurassic taxa, known for their compact, dolphin-like bodies adapted for more continuous swimming favorable to pursuit predators. A strikingly similar bauplan was later obtained by two other large bodied marine amniote groups, mosasaurs and archaeocete whales.

Direct evidence for its diet exists for the medium-sized Cymbospondylus buchseri from Switzerland, which was found with its stomach contents exclusively consisting of hooks belonging to soft-bodied coleoid cephalopods. However, this does not exclude the possibility that C. buchseri could have taken larger prey, as its last meal may not reflect its typical diet accurately. Bindellini and colleagues suggest that C. buchseri may have employed a more forceful feeding strategy with a slower feeding cycle and a higher biteforce, supported by the animal's robust rostrum. In the Besano Formation, Cymbospondylus would have coexisted with two other smaller ichthyosaurs, the more gracile skulled Besanosaurus and small mixosaurs. Whether or not C. buchseri would have gone after large vertebrate prey, all three taxa display clear adaptations for different hunting strategies and prey preferences, however the details of their ecologies are not yet fully understood.

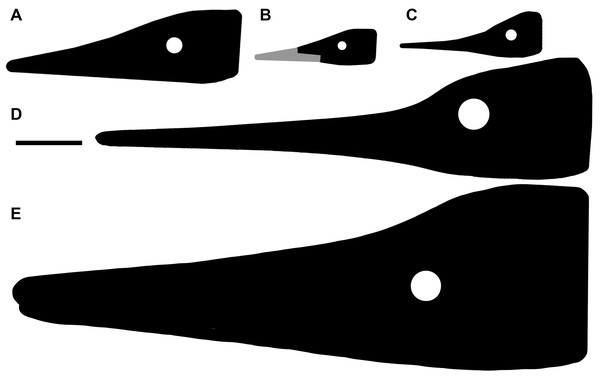
Examples of longirostrine ichthyosaurs of the Triassic, E is C. buchseri

For C. youngorum a generalist diet of squid and fish is inferred based on the blunt and conical teeth in combination with the elongated rostrum. However, as with C. buchseri, Sander et al. entertain the possibility that C. youngorum could have fed on large-bodied vertebrates as well, including the other Cymbospondylus species of the region.

Bindellini and colleagues notes that shastasaurid diversity may have profited from the extinction of Cymbospondylus, such as the Carnian of China, known to have supported three ecologically different shastasaurids but no examples of cymbospondylids, which had gone extinct by that time.

=== Reproduction ===
The holotype of C. duelferi preserves three small strings of articulated vertebrae located within the trunk region of the specimen. These vertebrae, which are only a third the size of the adult specimen, have been interpreted to represent the remains of three fetuses, with one specimen specifically facing towards the rear end of the putative mother. Following this interpretation, Cymbospondylus would have given live birth to a minimum of three offspring.

== Paleoecology ==
=== North America ===
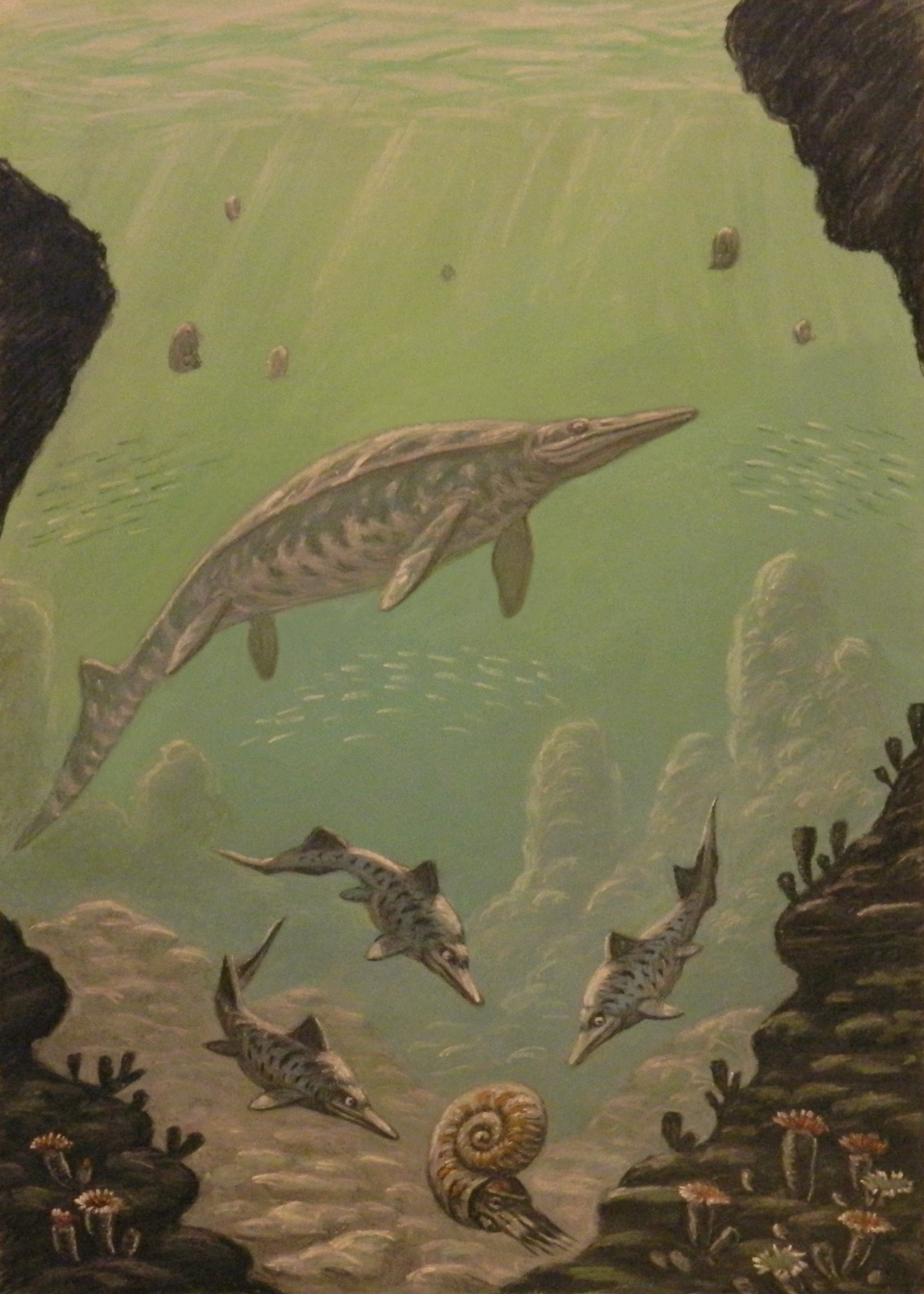
Life restoration of a C. petrinus swimming near a group of Phalarodon

All North American species of Cymbospondylus are known from fossils found in two geologic formations in the Star Peak Group, located in Nevada. C. petrinus, C. nichollsi, C. duelferi and C. youngorum are known from the Favret Formation, but the first named species is the only known representative of the genus who have been identified in the Prida Formation. These two formations are linked by a single member, known as the Fossil Hill Member. In the Prida Formation, this member outcrops west of the Humboldt Range, and extends to the Favret Formation, outcropping the Augusta Mountains, where it reaches up to more than 300 m wide. Although they are neighbors, the two formations do not share precisely the same age, the Prida one dating from the Middle Anisian, while Favret dates from the Late Anisian, between approximately 244 and 242 million years ago.

The significant presence of marine reptiles, ammonites and other invertebrates in the Fossil Hill Member indicates that the surface waters were well aerated, but there is however little animal presence in the benthic zones, with the notable exception of bivalves of the Halobiidae family. The fossils found show that the rock unit was once a pelagic ecosystem with a stable food web. Bony fish are little known and have currently only been discovered in the Favret Formation. Among the fish discovered, we find the actinopterygians Saurichthys and an undetermined representative, while among the sarcopterygians, numerous specimens of indeterminate coelacanthids are known. In the Prida Formation, a significant number of cartilaginous fishes have been identified. These include the hybodontiforms, one synechodontiform, and problematically positioned elasmobranchians. The most abundant marine reptiles of the Fossil Hill Member are the ichthyosaurs, including Cymbospondylus itself, Omphalosaurus, Phalarodon and the large Thalattoarchon. Few other marine reptiles are known from the Fossil Hill Member, the only clearly identified being the sauropterygian Augustasaurus.

=== Europe ===
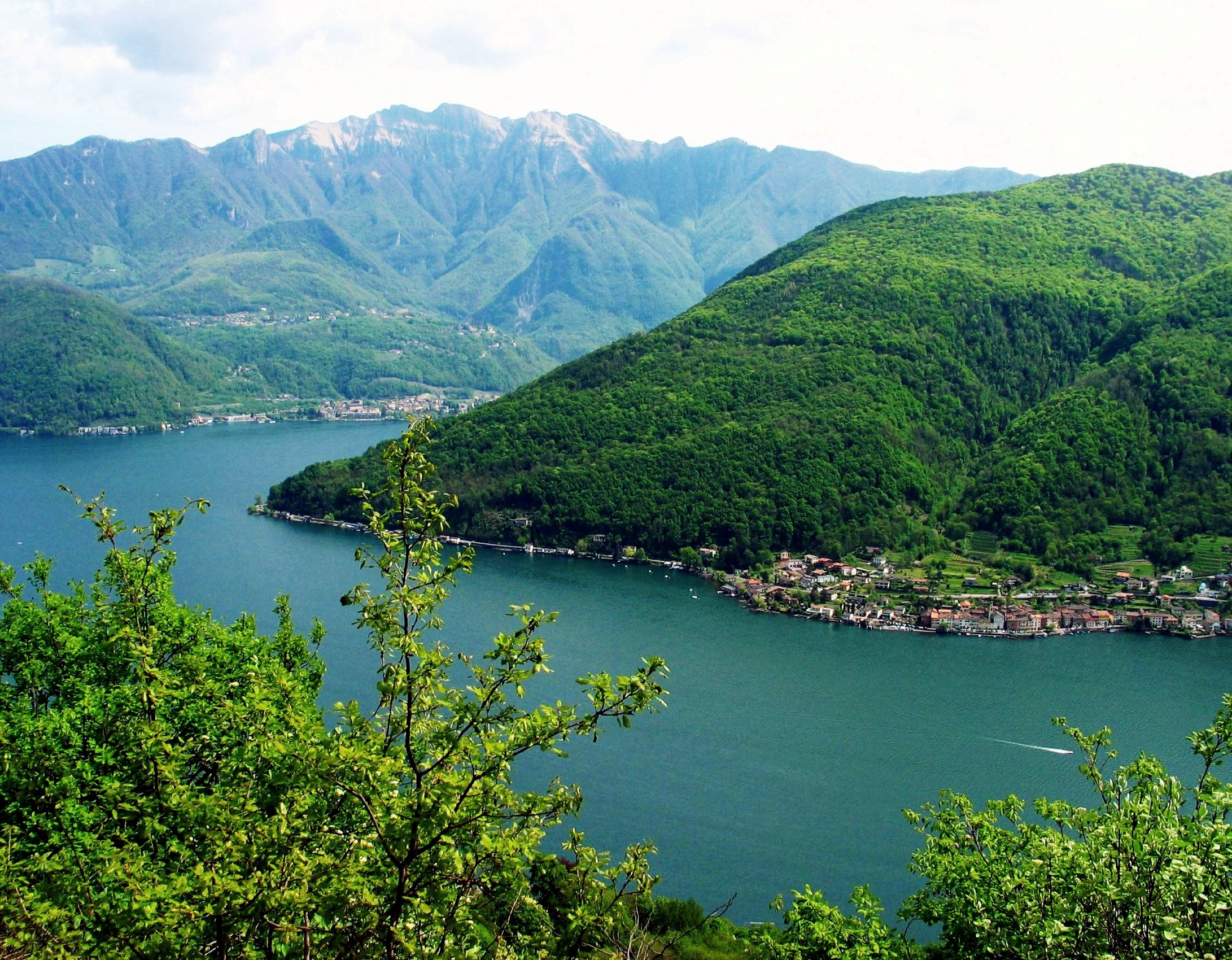
A view of Monte San Giorgio.

The only currently known specimen of C. buschseri is recorded from the Besano Formation, also known as the Grenzbitumenzone in Switzerland. This formation is located in the Alps and extends from southern Switzerland to northern Italy, containing numerous fossils dating from between the end of the Anisian and the beginning of the Ladinian. This formation is one of a series of Middle Triassic units atop a carbonate platform at Monte San Giorgio, and measures 5–16 metres (16–52 ft) thick. During the time when the animal lived, when the Besano Formation was being deposited, the region where Monte San Giorgio is would have been a marine lagoon, located in a basin on the western side of the Tethys Ocean. Researchers estimate that this same lagoon would have reached between 30–130 metres (98–427 ft) deep. The near-surface waters would have been well oxygenated and were inhabited by a wide range of plankton and free-swimming organisms. However, water circulation within the lagoon was poor, resulting in typically anoxic water at the bottom, deprived of oxygen. The lagoon bottom would have been quite calm, as evidenced by the fine lamination of the rocks, and there is little evidence of bottom-dwelling organisms modifying the sediment. The presence of terrestrial fossils, such as conifers and land-dwelling reptiles indicates that the region would have been near land.

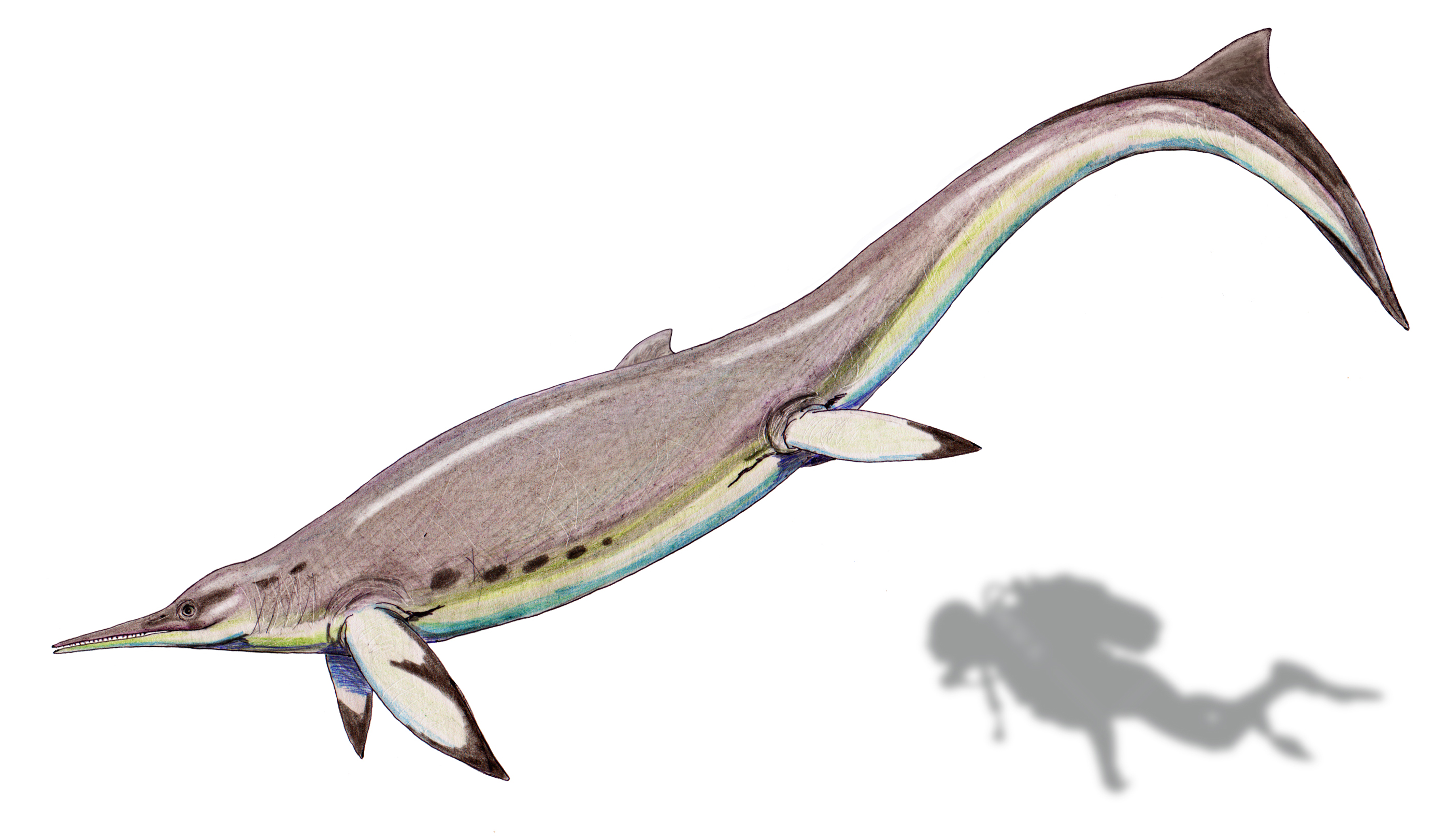
Life restoration of Besanosaurus, an ichthyosaur contemporary with C. buchseri

Among the most common of the invertebrates from the Besano Formation is the bivalve Daonella. Many gastropods are known from the Besano Formation; predominantly those that could have lived as plankton or on algae. Cephalopods present include nautiloids, coleoids, and the especially common ammonites. The coleoids from the Besano Formation are not particularly diverse, but this may be due to their remains not readily fossilizing, with many of their known remains being preserved as stomach contents within the bodies of ichthyosaurs. Arthropods known from the formation include ostracods, thylacocephalans, and shrimp. Other, rarer invertebrate groups known from the formation include brachiopods and echinoids, which lived on the seabed. Radiolarians and macroalgae are also known in the formation, though the latter may have been washed in from elsewhere, as with many other bottom-dwelling organisms. A very large number of bony fish have been recorded in this formation. Many bony fish have been recorded in this formation, with actinopterygians being quite diverse, including abundant small species as well as larger representatives like Saurichthys. Among the sarcopterygians, the number is more limited with in particular Rieppelia, Ticinepomis and possibly Holophagus, which are all coelacanthiforms. cartilaginous fishes of the Besano Formation are uncommon as well and mainly consist of hybodonts.

Unlike the Fossil Hill Member in Nevada, ichthyosaurs do not represent the most diverse marine reptiles in the Besano Formation, the latter being limited only to Besanosaurus, C. buchseri, Phalarodon and Mixosaurus, their abundance in the middle part of this zone correlating with the time when the lagoon was deepest. Conversely, the sauropterygians represent the largest part of the assemblage of marine reptiles of this formation. Among these are the shell-crushing placodonts Paraplacodus and Cyamodus. as well as pachypleurosaurs and nothosaurids. The pachypleurosaur Odoiporosaurus is known from the middle Besano Formation, while the particularly abundant Serpianosaurus did not appear until the upper portion of the formation, where ichthyosaurs are becoming rarer. Nothosaurids include the genera Silvestrosaurus and Nothosaurus, the latter notably including N. giganteus and possibly N. juvenilis. While rare, N. giganteus may have been an apex predator like C. buschseri. Apart from ichthyosaurs and sauropterygians, other marine reptiles include the long-necked Tanystropheus and Macrocnemus, and the thalattosaurians Askeptosaurus, Clarazia and Hescheleria.

=== Niche partitioning ===
In both the Fossil Hill Member and the Besano Formation, Cymbospondylus is one of a variety of ichthyosaurs. The different species known would have had different feeding strategies to avoid competition. Due to its large and sharp teeth, Thalattoarchon would probably have been the only apex predator with which Cymbospondylus was contemporary, probably attacking smaller marine reptiles, or even juveniles. Besanosaurus would likely have specialized in feeding on coleoids, based on the shape and small size of its teeth. The stomach contents of Mixosaurus cornalianus show the remains of small coleoids and fish, suggesting that it would have gone after smaller prey than its larger relatives. The rarer mixosaurids Mixosaurus kuhnschnyderi and Phalarodon both possess broad crushing teeth. M. kuhnschnyderi is understood to have consumed coleoids, while the larger teeth of Phalarodon may have been suited for crushing prey items with external shells. Omphalosaurus was probably a bulk feeder specialized in grinding up ammonites.

== Extinction ==
In 2021, Gabriele Bindellini and colleagues note that shastasaurid diversity may have benefited from the extinction of Cymbospondylus, as shown in the Carnian fossil record of China, known to have three ecologically different shastasaurids, but no examples of cymbospondylids, being extinct at this time.

== Notable appearances in media ==
A Cymbospondylus is present in the 2003 BBC docufiction Sea Monsters, and more precisely in a sequence featuring various marine reptiles of the Triassic. In the only scene in which it appears, the latter grabs by surprise a torn tail of a Tanystropheus, until then held by Nigel Marven, before the animal appears threatening towards the presenter.

In The Magic School Bus Rides Again Season 2, Episode 1, Carlos is transformed into a Cymbospondylus, nicknamed "Seaserpentusmaximus reallyreallyscariest" by Ms. Frizzle.

== See also ==
- List of ichthyosaurs
- Timeline of ichthyosaur research
