= Bens Peak =

Mountain in Nevada, United States

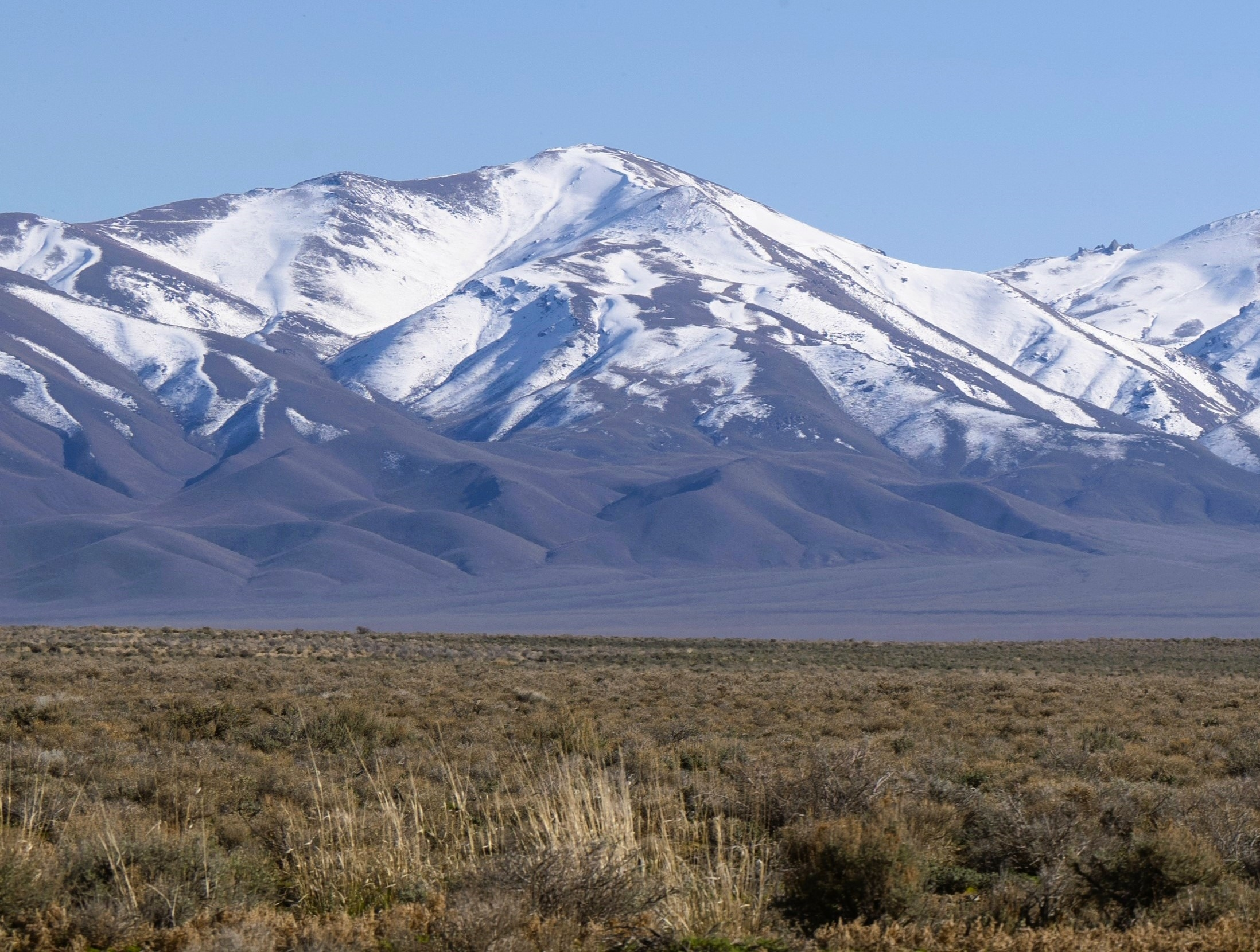
- North aspect

Highest point
- Elevation: 8,567 ft (2,611 m)
- Prominence: 938 ft (286 m)
- Parent peak: Mount Lewis
- Isolation: 2.52 mi (4.06 km)
- Coordinates: 40°26′42″N 116°51′17″W

Geography
- Location within Nevada Location within the United States
- Country: United States
- State: Nevada
- County: Lander
- Parent range: Shoshone Range; Great Basin Ranges
- Topo map: USGS Mount Lewis

Geology
- Mountain type: Fault block

Bens Peak is an 8,567-foot-elevation (2,611-meter) mountain summit in Lander County, Nevada, United States.

== Description ==
Bens Peak is part of the Shoshone Range which is a subrange of the Great Basin Ranges. The peak is located 2.5 miles (4.0 km) north of Mount Lewis which is the highest point of the Shoshone Range. The nearest community is Battle Mountain, Nevada, 13 miles (21 km) to the north-northwest. Precipitation runoff from the mountain's slopes drains into the Humboldt River drainage basin. Topographic relief is significant as the summit rises 2,300 feet (701 meters) above Lewis Canyon in approximately one mile (1.6 km). The peak is set on public land administered by the Bureau of Land Management. This landform's toponym has been officially adopted by the U.S. Board on Geographic Names.

== Climate ==
Bens Peak is set within the Great Basin Desert which has hot summers and cold winters. The desert is an example of a cold desert climate as the desert's elevation makes temperatures cooler than lower elevation deserts. Due to the high elevation and aridity, temperatures drop sharply after sunset. Summer nights are comfortably cool. Winter highs are generally above freezing, and winter nights are bitterly cold, with temperatures often dropping well below freezing.

== See also ==
- Great Basin
