= Jersey Valley =

- Location within Nevada
- Long-axis direction: N-S

Geography
- Country: United States
- State: Nevada
- Region: Great Basin
- County: Pershing
- Borders on: Tobin Range; Fish Creek Mountains; Augusta Mountains
- Coordinates: 40°10′2.75″N 117°31′53.40″W
- Interactive map of Jersey Valley

Jersey Valley is a valley in the U.S. state of Nevada.

Jersey Valley is located north of Dixie Valley.

== Jersey Valley Geothermal Power Plant ==
The 15 MW Jersey Valley Geothermal Power Plant came online in late 2010.

== Jersey Valley Hot Spring ==
The Jersey Valley Hot Spring had a flow of 35 to 75 gallons per minute at about 120°F for over 100 years. The pool was about 40 feet in diameter. From 2013 through 2015, the flow decreased and eventually the spring dried up.

The May 2010 environment assessment for the Jersey Valley Geothermal Development Project required that if the springs were negatively affected, then Ormat would restore the spring. In about 2019, the Bureau of Land Management (BLM), Ormat and the water rights holder agreed that Ormat would supply water to the spring. At the end of 2022, the BLM reviewed the environmental assessment documents and issued a "Finding of No Significant Impact" for Ormat to run a pipeline from an existing well to supply Jersey Valley Hot Spring.
