= New Pass Range =

Mountain range in Nevada, United States

- Location within Nevada

Highest point
- Peak: New Pass Peak
- Elevation: 2,744 m (9,003 ft)
- Coordinates: 39°38′48″N 117°29′07″W

Dimensions
- Length: 16 mi (26 km) North-south

Geography
- Country: United States
- State: Nevada
- Counties: Lander County and Churchill County
- Range coordinates: 39°41′19″N 117°28′25″W
- Topo map: USGS New Pass Peak

The New Pass Range is a mountain range in Lander and Churchill counties of Nevada. The range is a north-south trending range which straddles the Lander-Churchill county boundary for about 16 miles (26 km). The highest peak, New Pass Peak, has an elevation of 9,003 feet (2,744 m). US Route 50 crosses New Pass Summit on the south end of the range between Austin to the east and Fallon on to the west. The range was named from an early settler's belief that his route through the mountains was a "new pass" through the area.

The Desatoya Mountains lie to the southwest and the Clan Alpine Mountains to the west. To the north is the Augusta Mountains with Antelope Valley to the northeast. To the east is Ravenswood Mountain at the south end of the Shoshone Range and Nevada State Route 305. To the southeast across the Reese River Valley is Austin at the north end of the Toiyabe Range.

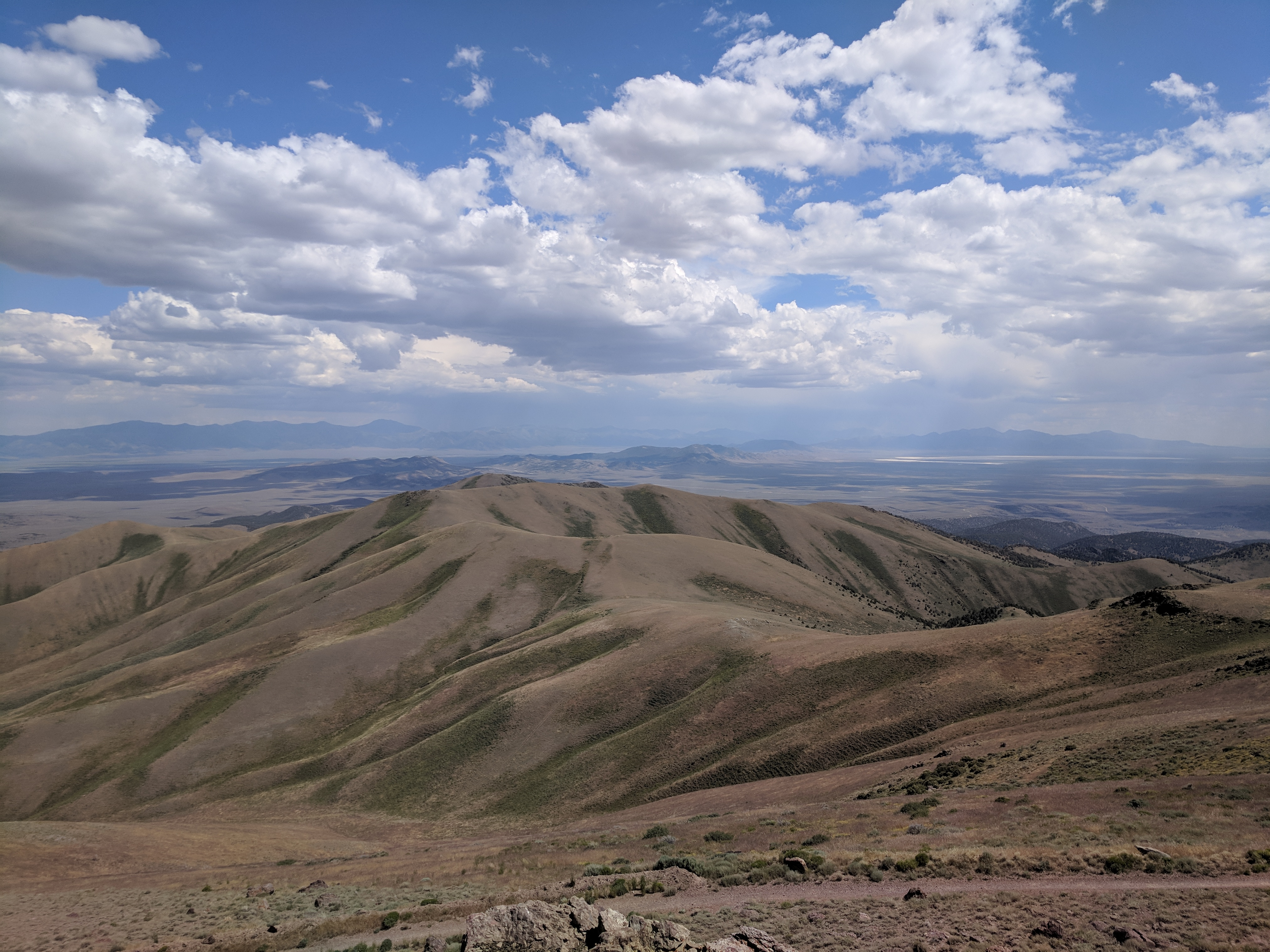
New Pass Range as viewed from New Pass Peak
