= Mount Lewis =

Mount Lewis may refer to:

- Mount Lewis (Antarctica), a summit in Victoria Land
- Mount Lewis (California), a summit on the Sierra Crest
- Mount Lewis (Nevada) in the Shoshone Range of Nevada, near Lewis Peak
- Mount Lewis (Yukon), a summit in Saint Cyr Range, Canada
- Mount Lewis, New South Wales, a suburb of the City of Bankstown
- Mount Lewis National Park, near Cairns in Queensland, Australia.
