= Yangliujing Formation =

Geological formation in southern China

- Stratigraphic range: late Anisian-Ladinian; 246–242 Ma
- Type: Geological formation
- Underlies: Zhuganpo Formation
- Overlies: Guanling Formation

Lithology
- Primary: Dolomite
- Other: Limestone

Location
- Coordinates: 25.9°N 105.5°E
- Approximate paleocoordinates: 12.3°N 94.5°E
- Region: Guizhou & Yunnan Provinces
- Country: China
- Extent: Yunnan–Guizhou Plateau
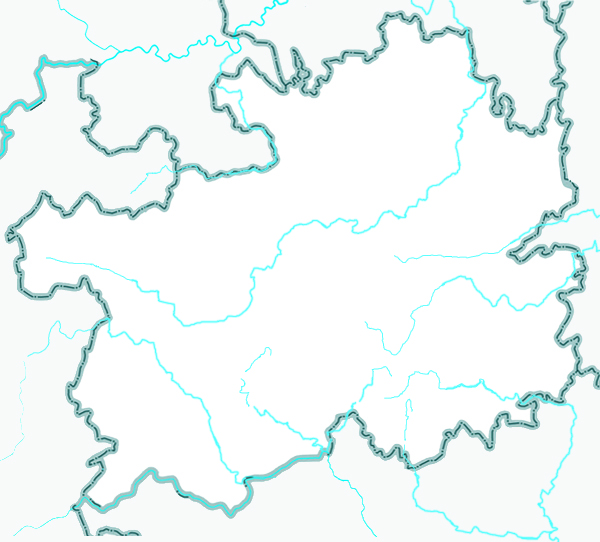
- Yangliujing Formation (China) Yangliujing Formation (Guizhou)

The Yangliujing Formation is a Middle Triassic geologic unit found in the Guizhou and Yunnan Provinces of southern China.

== Description ==
Most of the formation is represented by massive dolomites, indicative of a shallow-water depositional environment. Fossils are generally rare, but conodonts from the Anisian-Ladinian boundary (namely several species of Neogondolella) are known from the lower part of the formation. Some marine reptiles have been found in dolomitic limestone near Dingxiao, an area of Guizhou sometimes considered to preserve the upper part of the Yangliujing Formation. However, under a more restrictive definition of the Yangliujing Formation, the fossils of Dingxiao would instead belong to the overlying Zhuganpo Formation.

== Fossil content ==
The following fossils have been reported from the formation:

Fish

- Omanoselache contrarius
- ?Parvodus sp.
- ?Semionotiformes indet.

Brachiopods

- Mentzelia sp.
- Nudispiriferina sp.

Bivalves

- Asoella illyrica
- Unionites sp.

Crinoids

- Traumatocrinus hsui

Conodonts

- Ozarkodina kockeli
