= Cain Mountain Wilderness =

Wilderness area in Nevada, United States

- IUCN category Ib (wilderness area)
- Location within Nevada
- Location: Churchill and Lander Counties, Nevada
- Nearest city: Fallon, Nevada
- Coordinates: 40.0237808°N 117.6167101°W
- Area: 14,050 acres (5,690 ha)
- Established: December 23, 2022
- Governing body: U.S. Bureau of Land Management

Cain Mountain Wilderness is a wilderness area located in western Nevada near Fallon. It follows the central ridge of the Augusta Mountains and covers approximately 14,050 acres of land. The lower portions are covered in sagebrush and rabbitbrush, while stands of pinyon-juniper, cottonwood, and willow thrive in the rugged canyons of the mountain slopes. The land is managed by the Bureau of Land Management Winnemucca Field Office.

In 1980, the Bureau of Land Management established the 89,372-acre Augusta Mountain Wilderness Study Area to protect land within the Augusta Mountains. With some local advocacy from the Friends of Nevada Wilderness, some of the land was allocated as wilderness as part of the 2023 National Defense Authorization Act.
