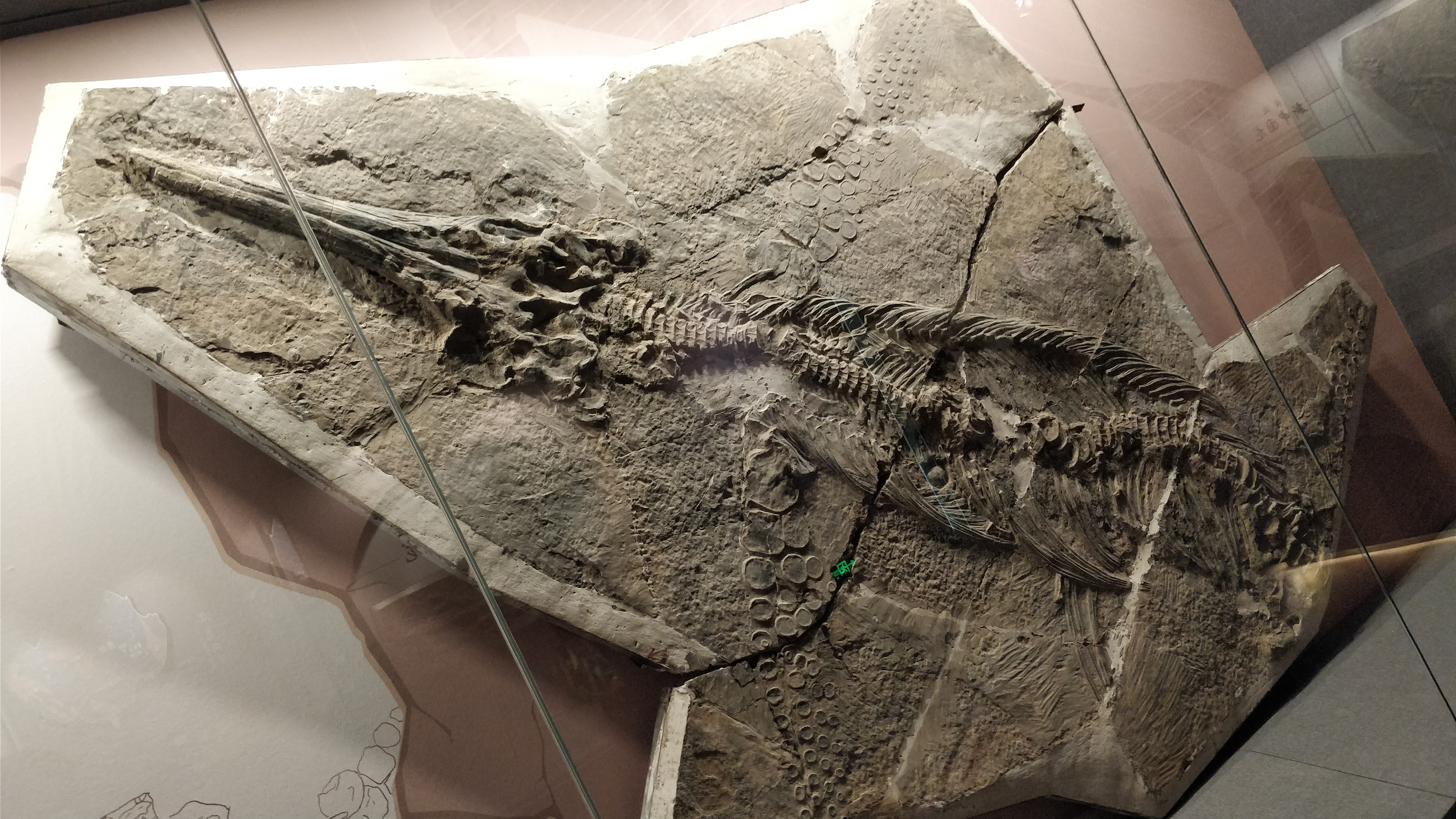
- Skeleton of Guizhouichthyosaurus tangae in Geological Museum of Guizhou

Scientific classification
- Kingdom: Animalia
- Phylum: Chordata
- Class: Reptilia
- Order: †Ichthyosauria
- Node: †Merriamosauria
- Clade: †Euichthyosauria
- Genus: †Guizhouichthyosaurus
- Species: †G. tangae

Binomial name
- †Guizhouichthyosaurus tangae Cao & Luo, 2000 (type)

Synonyms
- Cymbospondylus asiaticus Li & You, 2002; Panjiangsaurus epicharis Chen & Chang, 2003; Shastasaurus tangae (Cao & Luo, 2000)

= Guizhouichthyosaurus =

Guizhouichthyosaurus Temporal range: Triassic, Ladinian–Carnian

Extinct genus of reptiles

Guizhouichthyosaurus is an extinct genus of ichthyosaur which is known primarily from the Xiaowa Formation of the lower Carnian stage of the Late Triassic in southwest China. The type species of this genus is Guizhouichthyosaurus tangae, of which multiple skeletons are known. It has been reassigned as a species of the genus Shastasaurus in the past, though it has since been considered distinct. The ichthyosaurs Cymbospondylus asiaticus, named in 2002, and Panjiangsaurus epicharis, named in 2003, are junior synonyms of G. tangae. The genus is also known from the Ladinian-aged Middle Triassic Zhuganpo Formation; additionally, the species "Callawayia" wollongangense may belong to Guizhouichthyosaurus.

Guizhouichthyosaurus is a large ichthyosaur, typically measuring approximately 5 metres (16 ft) long with some specimens exceeding 6 metres (20 ft). The snout is long and powerful, and there is a low sagittal crest on the rear part of its skull. The tail is bent downwards near its end, the scapulae (shoulder blades) are shaped like sickles, and an opening is enclosed between each set of lower leg bones. Each limb contains a minimum of four digits. Two distinct morphotypes of Guizhouichthyosaurus are known, differentiated by skull and limb morphology, which likely represent males and females.

Guizhouichthyosaurus, like other early ichthyosaurs, would have used anguilliform (eel-like) locomotion, unlike the more efficient cod- and tuna-like swimming of later ichthyosaurs. While one specimen of Guizhouichthyosaurus contained gastroliths as stomach contents, their ingestion may have been accidental, as stomach stones are very uncommon in ichthyosaurs. Despite its small, smooth-edged teeth, Guizhouichthyosaurus is known to have been able to consume other large marine reptiles, as evidenced from a thalattosaur skeleton in the stomach region of one specimen, indicating that Guizhouichthyosaurus was an apex predator.

== History of research ==
Guizhouichthyosaurus tangae was one of three new genera and species of ichthyosaurs from the Xiaowa Formation (which was deposited in the lower Carnian stage of the Late Triassic) of China named by Y. Cao and Y. Luo in 2000. G. tangae was named based on Gmr 009, a well-preserved specimen, although it is missing the hips, a hindflipper, and much of its tail. Li Chun and You Hai-Lu named a new species of Cymbospondylus, C. asiaticus, from the same region in 2002 based on two nearly complete skulls. They noted that this was the first time that Cymbospondylus had ever been reported from outside North America and Europe, in addition to the first occurrence outside the Middle Triassic. In 2003, another ichthyosaur, Panjiangsaurus epicharis, was named by Chen Xiaohong and Cheng Long, based on the nearly perfectly-preserved specimen TR 00001, the holotype, and the additional specimen SPCV30014, a three-dimensionally preserved skull.

A study of the cranial anatomy of Guizhouichthyosaurus was conducted by Michael Maisch and colleagues in 2006. They described multiple specimens; GNG dq-46, a good skull discovered by farmers at Wolonggang in 1998, then sent to the Guanling National Geopark of Fossil Biota where it was prepared by Jin-ZhaoDing and Da-Peng Zhang; GNG dp-22, a partial skull mixed up with the remains of other ichthyosaurs; and GNG D-41, a complete, though incompletely prepared, skeleton. Pan Xinru and colleagues restudied Guizhouichthyosaurus and published their results in another 2006 paper, in which they described GNG D-41 in more detail. They found Panjiangsaurus epicharis and Cymbospondylus asiaticus to be junior synonyms of G. tangae.

In 2009, Shang Qing-Hua and Li Chun described a new specimen of Guizhouichthyosaurus, IVPP V 11853, a nearly complete articulated skeleton, missing only some parts of the flippers. They further described the anatomy of Guizhouichthyosaurus, using this new specimen to provide information on the shoulders, hips, and tail, which until then had been poorly known. However, they considered Guizhouichthyosaurus to be so similar to Shastasaurus that they synonymized it with that genus, although they kept S. tangae as a distinct species. They concurred with previous studies that Panjiangsaurus epicharis and Cymbospondylus asiaticus were junior synonyms of this species.

However, in 2010, Maisch provisionally accepted Guizhouichthyosaurus as a distinct genus. While he considered the two genera to be quite similar, he noted that the majority of the traits that had been used to synonymize it with Shastasaurus were ancestral characteristics of that group of Triassic ichthyosaurs instead of novel evolutionary changes, and stated that further research was still needed before the two could be synonymized. A 2011 paper by P. Martin Sander and colleagues considered Guizhouichthyosaurus to be quite distinct from Shastasaurus, and while Shang and Li again used the name Shastasaurus tangae in a 2013 paper, Guizhouichthyosaurus has since been accepted as valid and different from Shastasaurus. In 2020, Da-Yong Jiang and colleagues described XNGM-WS-50-R4, a specimen that they assigned to Guizhouichthyosaurus sp., which came from the Zhuganpo Formation, dating to the Ladinian stage of the Middle Triassic. It was dug up in 2010 and contained a thalattosaur as stomach contents.

=== Callawayia wolonggangense ===
In 2007, X. Chen and colleagues named a new species of the ichthyosaur Callawayia, C. wolonggangse, based on material from Guizhou, China. In 2010, Maisch moved this species to Guizhouichthyosaurus, as G. wolonggangense, noting that it was distinctly different from Callawayia. He considered the characteristics used to differentiate G. wolonggangense unconvincing, however, and that this species was probably just a junior synonym of G. tangae. He still maintained it as provisionally valid though, as detailed investigation had not yet been done.

In 2016, Ji and colleagues found no characteristics uniting "C." wolonggangense and the type species of Callawayia, C. neoscapularis, and thus rejected the assignment of the former species to this genus. However, they found no traits unambiguously linking it to Guizhouichthyosaurus either, thus also rejected its assignment to that genus. Further studies have variably referred to the species as "C." wolonggangense or G. wolonggangense, but phylogenetic analyses have generally found results similar to those of Ji and colleagues, where the species is not found to be the sister taxon of the type species of either genus.

== Description ==
Guizhouichthyosaurus has been described as moderate to very large in size for an ichthyosaur. XNGM-WS-50-R4, a nearly complete skeleton assigned to Guizhouichthyosaurus sp. measures 4.8 m (16 ft) long. As for specimens of G. tangae, the total length of the nearly complete skeleton IVPP V 11853 exceeds 5.2 m (17 ft), while TR 00001 (the holotype of Panjiangsaurus) measures 5.4 m (18 ft) long and the complete skeleton GNP-d41 measures more than 6 m (20 ft) long. These specimens of G. tangae are estimated to have weighed between 914–1,404 kg (2,015–3,095 lb). Additionally, specimens of Guizhouichthyosaurus reaching around 7 m (23 ft) in total length have also been reported.

=== Skull ===
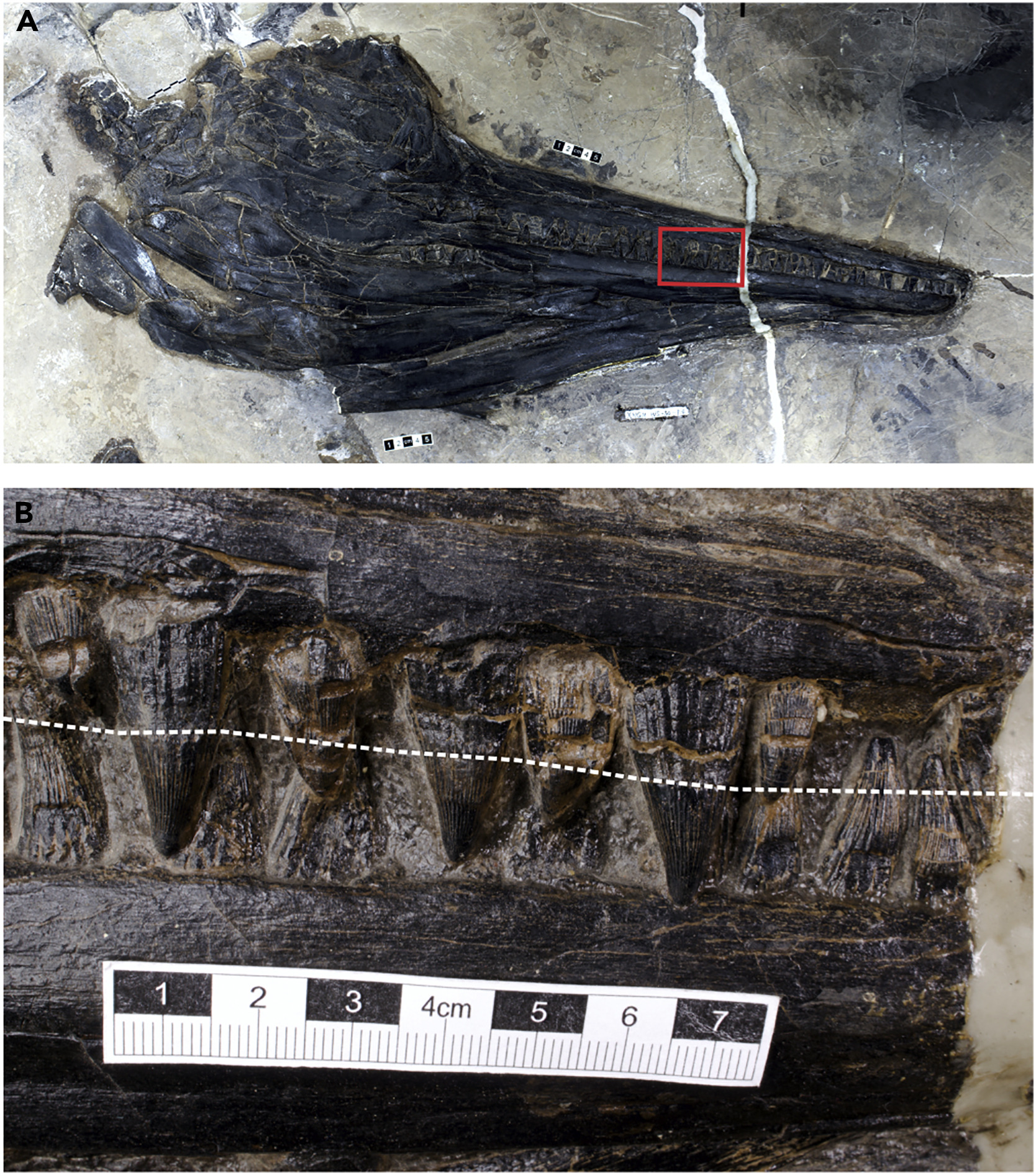
Skull of Guizhouichthyosaurus sp., XNGM-WS-50-R4, with a close-up of the teeth

Guizhouichthyosaurus has a long, powerful snout. An extensive groove is present in front of each external naris (nostril opening). The premaxillae (front upper tooth-bearing bones) do not extend beneath the external nares. However, a spear-shaped projection of each premaxilla forms most of the upper rim of each external naris. The external nares are oval-shaped and small. The maxillae (back upper tooth-bearing bones) extend quite far forwards. They also bear long, rearwards extensions that almost touch the prefrontals (a pair of skull roof bones). The nasals (a pair of skull roof bones) extend as far back as to be level with the middle of the orbits (eye sockets), where they contact another pair of skull roof bones, the postfrontals. The orbits of Guizhouichthyosaurus are distinctively shaped, having convex front, straight rear and lower, and weakly concave upper margins. The front thirds of their upper borders are formed by the prefrontals, which are small in Guizhouichthyosaurus.

The portion of the skull located behind the orbits is rather short, not much more than half of the orbital length in adults. There is a large, triangular indentation behind the jugals, the bones that form the lower rims of the orbits. The contact between the jugals and quadratojugals (paired bones towards the back of the skull) is hidden on the outside of the skull by two other pairs of bones, the postorbitals and squamosals. The pineal foramen (an opening on top of the skull) is flanked by sharp ridges on the frontals and parietals (two pairs of skull roof bones). The low, thin, well-developed sagittal crest on the parietals splits in two at its front and rear ends. A reasonably prominent flat shelf is present in the front regions of the depressions surrounding each temporal fenestra (openings on top of the skull). The frontals form part of these shelves, but do not reach the fenestrae, with the rest of the shelves formed by the postfrontals and parietals. The front half of the outer edges of the fenestrae are formed by the postorbitals internally, but these bones are excluded from the exterior surface by the contacts between two pairs of skull roof bones, the postfrontals and supratemporals. These bones, in addition to the parietals, form the exterior rim of the temporal fenestrae.

The pterygoids (rear pair of palatal bones) lack prominent outwardly-directed projections. The space between the pterygoids is large. The surangulars (upper rear lower jaw bones) bear deep depressions that are confluent with depressions on the dentaries (lower tooth-bearing bones). The teeth of Guizhouichthyosaurus are conical, have somewhat blunted tips, and are set into sockets. They have 3 to 5 very fine vertical ridges, but lack cutting edges.

=== Postcranial skeleton ===
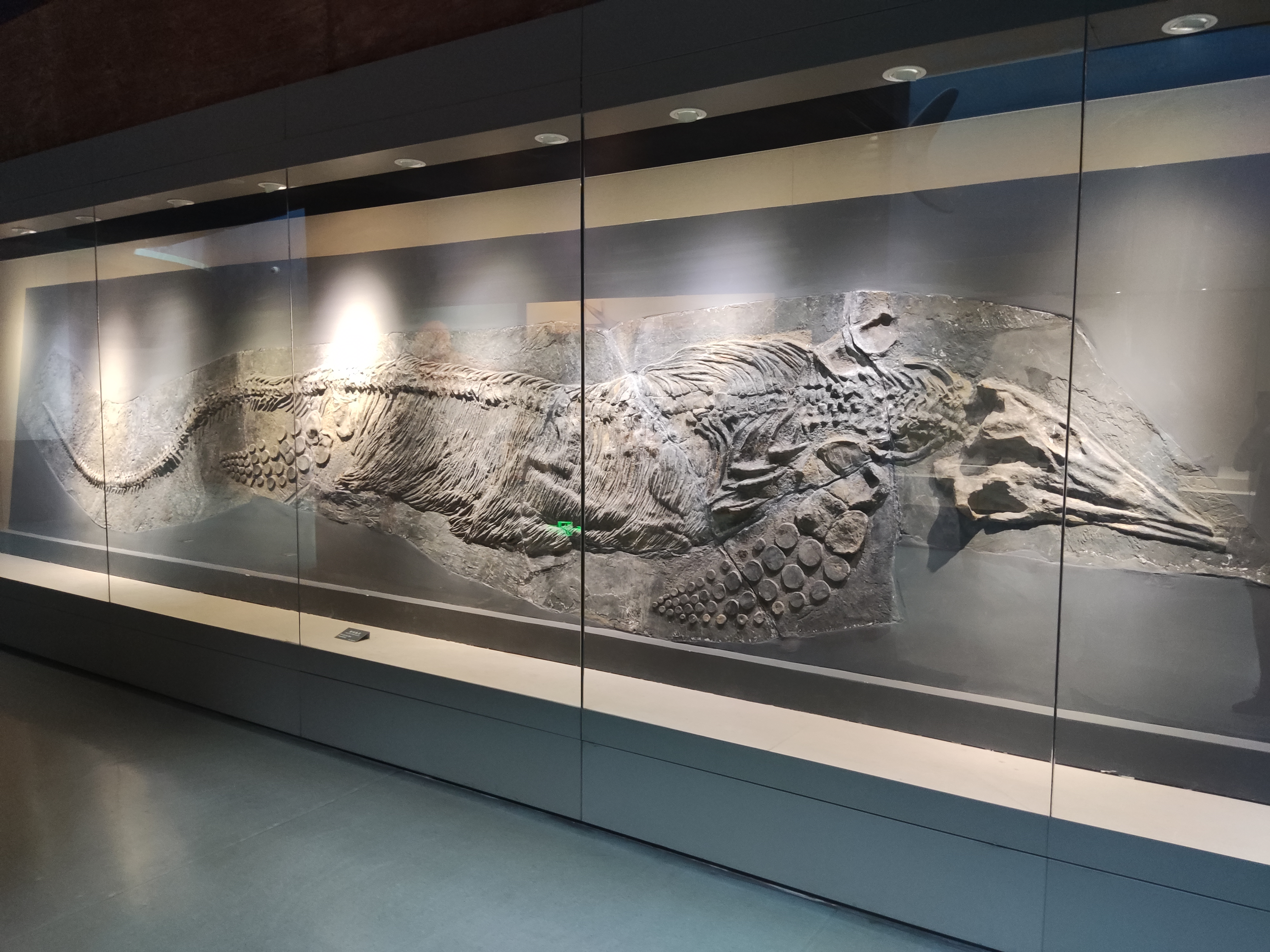
Guizhouichthyosaurus sp. at the Anhui Geological Museum

There are about 65 vertebrae in front of the hips in Guizhouichthyosaurus, followed by 2 hip vertebrae. The tail of Guizhouichthyosaurus is elongate, containing around 170 vertebrae, and is abruptly bent downwards near its end. The wide scapulae (shoulder blades) are asymmetrical, sickle-shaped, and lack constricted bases. The front edges of their blades are smooth and bow forwards, and do not have hook-like projections. The coracoids (another pair of shoulder bones) have prominent indentations in their front edges. The interclavicle (a shoulder bone between the collarbones) is shaped like the letter T. The central, lower projection of it is very small and narrow. The humeri (upper arm bones) have straight rear margins. The inner edges of the radii and ulnae (lower arm bones) are concave, leaving an opening between the two bones in each flipper. This is also seen in the lower leg bones, the tibiae and fibulae. An additional carpal (wrist bone) is present beneath each ulnare of Guizhouichthyosaurus. Both the forefins and hindfins of Guizhouichthyosaurus have four primary digits, in both cases representing digits II to V, but additional accessory digits may be present. The phalanges (digit bones) towards the tip of digit II in the hindfins are much larger than those closer to the base of the digit in some specimens.

== Paleobiology ==
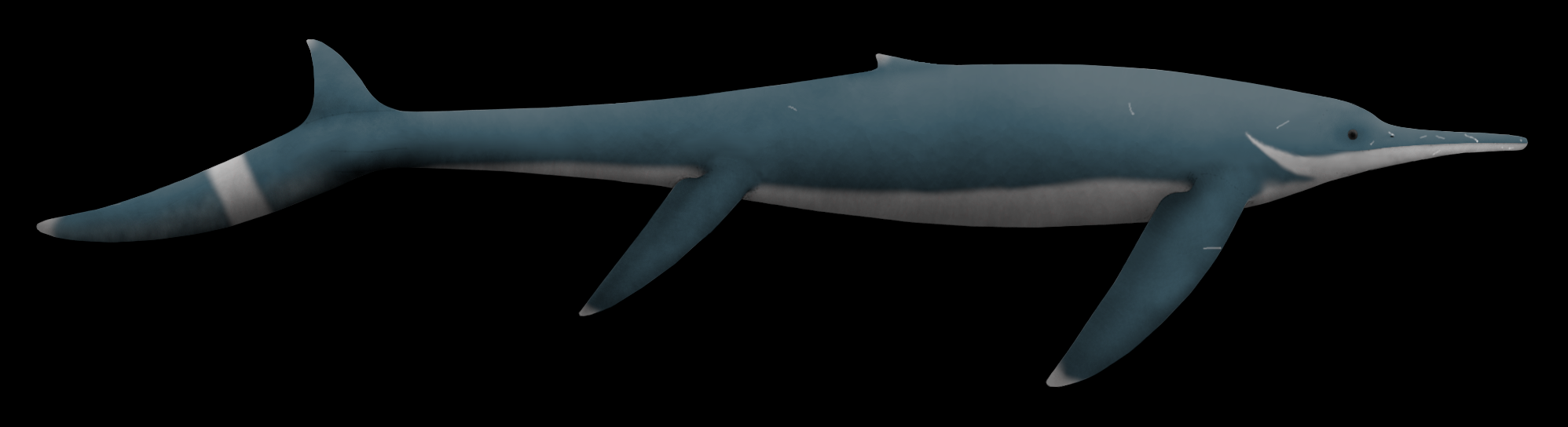
Life restoration of Guizhouichthyosaurus tangae

A 2013 study by Shang and Li found that all specimens of Guizhouichthyosaurus with sufficient good preservation could be divided into two morphotypes, though they were all sufficiently similar to belong to the same species. The morphotypes were named "type A" and "type B." Type A is characterized by long, narrow hindflippers, with the upper elements of digit II being reduced in size and no additional digit in front of it present. Sometimes there is an additional digit behind the main digits of the hindfin, although there usually is not. Type B is characterized by broader hindflippers without the size reduction of the upper digit II elements, as well an additional digit in front of and another behind the main ones. The skulls of the two types also differ, with type A having a more robust skull, a shorter snout, and a wider angle between the two halves of the sagittal crest where it splits at the front than type B. Additionally, the temporal fenestrae are more than twice as long as wide in type B but less than twice as long as wide in type A. Since there was no significant difference in skull or body size between the two types, Shang and Li rejected that the differences were due to growth, and instead considered that they most likely represented differences between males and females. Since members of type A have proportionately longer trunks and shorter tails than type B, the researchers considered type A to be the females, although no pregnant specimens are known to confirm this. In modern lizards, the larger trunks of females increase the amount of room for eggs. While as an ichthyopterygian, Guizhouichthyosaurus would have been a live-bearer, a similar trend in trunk-tail proportions is also seen in another group of vivaporous marine reptiles, the pachypleurosaurs.

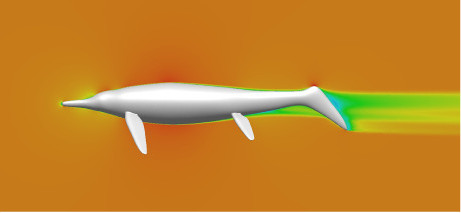
Computer simulation of flow velocity from Gutarra and colleagues' study; warmer colors indicate faster flow

In 2019, Susana Gutarra and colleagues studied the energy demands of swimming in ichthyosauriforms using computational fluid dynamics and models of nine taxa, one of which was Guizhouichthyosaurus. They found that the body shapes of the different ichthyosauriforms, when scaled to the same size and the effects of the limbs disregarded, all resulted in similar net energy costs and drag coefficients. Through their simulations, the researchers found that the water would have stagnated around the snouts of the ichthyosauriforms, then flowed more quickly across their bodies before slowing down in the animal's wake. Guizhouichthyosaurus, in addition to Chaohusaurus, produced more drag than the other taxa, due to their large flippers. However, when the models were scaled to the actual size of the animals, it became clear that ichthyosauriforms became increasingly efficient swimmers in their first 25 million years of evolution, largely due to body size. Additionally, while Triassic ichthyosaurs such as Guizhouichthyosaurus would have used anguilliform (eel-like) locomotion, later ichthyosaurs switched to the more efficient carangiform (cod-like) and thunniform (tuna-like) swimming styles. This switch likely explains why these later ichthyosaurs had deeper bodies.

=== Diet and feeding ===
Unusually for an ichthyosaur, TR 00001 preserves more than 100 gastroliths in its stomach region. These stones vary in size from 0.6 to 3.7 centimetres (0.24 to 1.46 in) in diameter and generally are rather round. They are preserved in two clusters, although Cheng and colleagues doubted that Guizhouichthyosaurus would have been stored them in two different regions, a configuration seen in no other vertebrate. Instead, they speculated that the clusters formed after death, or even that some gastroliths might have killed the animal after moving into and clogging its intestines. As the gastroliths did not resemble the surrounding rock, the scientists concluded that Guizhouichthyosaurus must have obtained them somewhere else, perhaps near a beach. While the function of gastroliths has been interpreted by some as buoyancy control, this is controversial, and Cheng and colleagues found the roughly 1 kilogram of stones to be insufficient to usefully serve as ballast for an animal potentially weighing as much as a ton. Since no other specimen of Guizhouichthyosaurus has gastroliths, they considered it most likely that the stones in TR 00001 were swallowed accidentally when attacking prey near the seafloor.

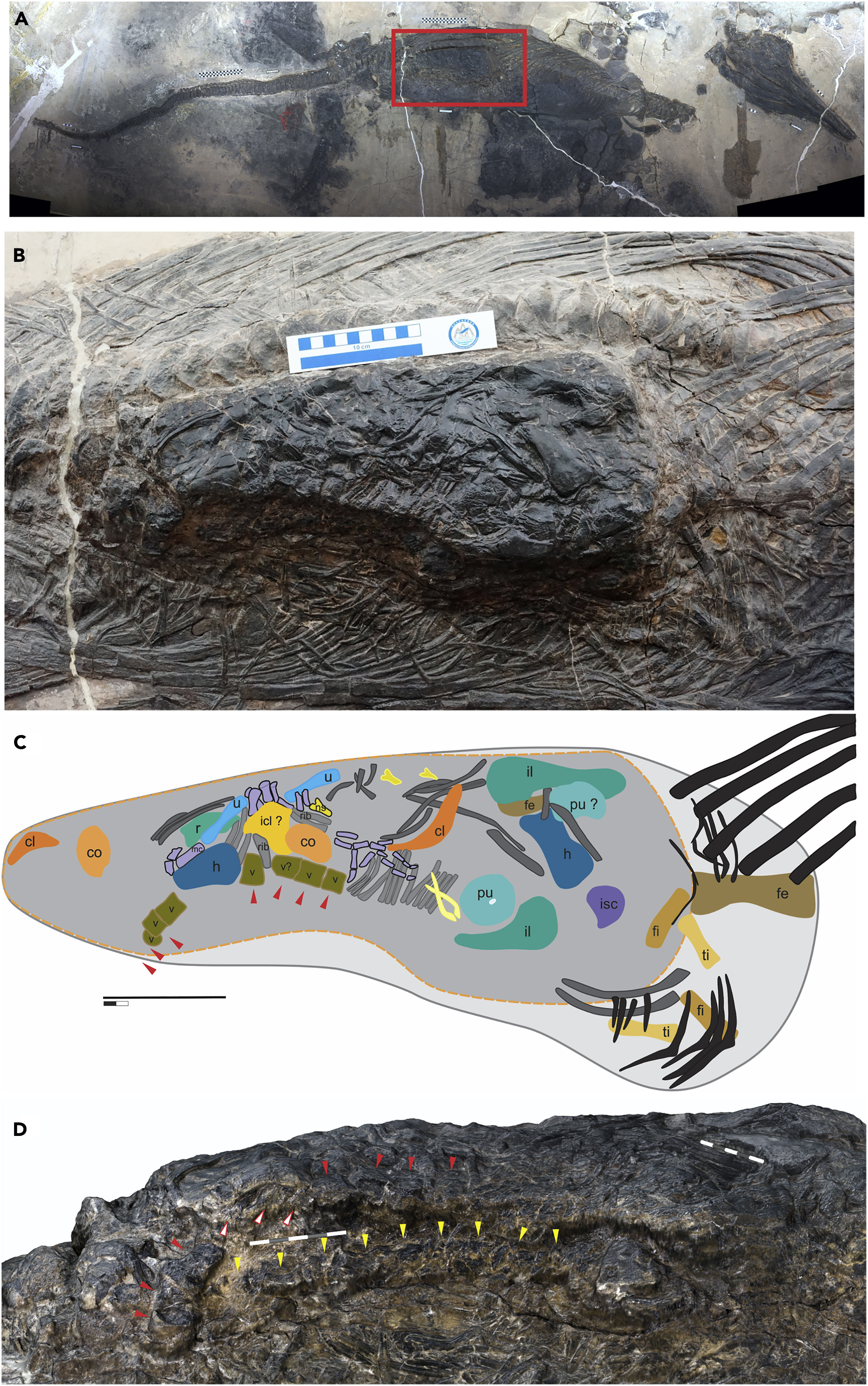
XNGM-WS-50-R4 (topmost), with stomach contents shown below

Unlike a typical predator of large animals, the teeth of Guizhouichthyosaurus are rather small and do not have cutting edges, suitable for holding on to prey items like cephalopods. Nevertheless, the Guizhouichthyosaurus sp. specimen XNGM-WS-50-R4 contains the torso and limbs of the thalattosaur Xinpusaurus, another marine reptile. The thalattosaur was estimated by Jiang and colleagues to have been approximately 4 metres (13 ft) long when complete compared to the 4.8 metres (16 ft) long ichthyosaur, and about one seventh of the predator's mass. The authors noted that Guizhouichthyosaurus appeared to be an apex predator, and predation upon large animals was likely more common among marine reptiles than previously thought. Jiang and colleagues considered it most likely that the thalattosaur was killed by the ichthyosaur, due to its completeness and the scarcity of marine carrion. 23 metres (75 ft) away from the skeletons, a tail potentially belonging to the consumed thalattosaur was found. As the thalattosaur skeleton shows little evidence of digestion, and the neck of the ichthyosaur appears to have been broken, Jiang and colleagues hypothesized that soon after eating its prey, the ichthyosaur died.

Jiang and colleagues noted that while teeth suited for grasping are useful in procuring cephalopods, they can also be used to hold prey underwater, thereby causing it to drown, as done by crocodiles. To detach the prey's head and tail, the researchers hypothesized that Guizhouichthyosaurus would have sharply twisted its head to tear them off, as done by orcas and crocodiles, which, like Guizhouichthyosaurus, also do not have teeth with cutting edges. The thalattosaur's trunk may have been swallowed in as many as four pieces, but it seems most likely that it was swallowed whole. Even though Guizhouichthyosaurus could not widen its skull, its gape was apparently sufficient to swallow the thalattosaur; its small shoulder bones also would have helped make it easier to swallow large animals by making the ribcage less constricted. Swallowing could have been accomplished using gravity above the water and inertia. However, Guizhouichthyosaurus ate other prey items as well, as evidenced by a G. tangae specimen preserving fish bones as well as some bivalves in its stomach region. Guizhouichthyosaurus was apparently a generalist feeder.

== See also ==
- List of ichthyosaurs
- Timeline of ichthyosaur research
