= Augusta Mountains =

Mountain range in Nevada, United States

- Location within Nevada

Highest point
- Peak: Cain Mountain
- Elevation: 2,563 m (8,409 ft)
- Coordinates: 40°01′27″N 117°32′36″W

Dimensions
- Length: 25 km (16 mi) N-S
- Width: 9 km (5.6 mi) E-W
- Area: 140 km^{2} (54 mi^{2})

Geography
- Country: United States
- State: Nevada
- District(s): Pershing, Churchill and Lander counties
- Range coordinates: 40°0′57.698″N 117°31′47.403″W
- Topo map: USGS Cain Mountain

The Augusta Mountains are a small mountain range in Pershing, Churchill and Lander counties of Nevada.

To the northeast the range merges with the Fish Creek Range. To the north across Jersey Valley lies the Tobin Range and to the west across the Dixie Valley is the Stillwater Range. The Clan Alpine Mountains and the New Pass Range lie to the south and to the east across Antelope Valley are Ravenswood Mountain and the Shoshone Range.

The Range is included within the 89,372 acres (361.68 km^{2}) Augusta Mountains Wilderness Study Area. The 14,050-acre Cain Mountain Wilderness is also located within the range.

The fossil aquatic reptile Augustasaurus was discovered in the Triassic Favret Formation in the Augusta Mountains and named after the range.
