= Zhuganpo Formation =

Triassic geologic unit in southern China

- Stratigraphic range: Upper Ladinian - Lower Carnian
- Type: Geological formation
- Underlies: Xiaowa Formation
- Overlies: Yangliujing Formation

Lithology
- Primary: limestone, marl

Location
- Region: Guizhou Province, Yunnan Province
- Country: China
- Extent: Yunnan–Guizhou Plateau

The Zhuganpo Formation is a Triassic geologic unit found in southern China. It has historically been known as the Zhuganpo Member of the Falang Formation. A diverse fossil assemblage known as the Xingyi biota or Xingyi Fauna can be found in the upper part of the Zhuganpo Formation. Fossils of the Xingyi biota include articulated skeletons of marine reptiles, abundant fish, and a plentiful assortment of invertebrates indicating a Ladinian to Carnian age for the sediments of the formation.

== Paleobiota ==
=== Invertebrates ===
- Ammonites: Clionitites sp., Detoniceras sp., Haoceras xingyiense, Parasturia sp., Protrachyceras sp., Ptychites sp., Sinomeginoceras (S. wangi, S. xingyiense), Trachyceras sp., Xenoprotrachyceras cf. primum, Yangites densicostatus,
- Bivalves: Daonella sp.
- Conodonts: Gladigondolella malayensis, Metapolygnathus / Paragondolella / Quadralella (Q. aff. acuminatus, P. foliata, P. inclinata, Q. intermedius, Q. langdaiensis, P. maantangensis, P. navicula, M. nodosus, M. parafoliata, Q. aff. praelindae, P. polygnathiformis, Q. shijiangjunensis, Q. tadpole, Q. uniformis, Q. wanlanensis, Q. aff. wayaoensis, Q. yongueensis, Q. aff. zonneveldi)
- Crinoids: Traumatocrinus hsui
- Crustaceans ("shrimps"): Schimperella acanthocercus (Lophogastrida)

=== Fish ===
- Acrolepidae indet.
- Archaesemionotus sp.
- aff. Arctacanthus sp. (Chimaeriformes?)
- Asialepidotus shingyiensis (Ionoscopiformes)
- Birgeria liui
- Caturidae indet.
- Eosemionotus sp.
- Favusodus orientalis (Euselachii)
- Fuyuanichthys wangi (Ginglymodi)
- Fuyuanperleidus dengi
- Guizhouamia bellula
- Guizhoubrachysomus minor
- Guizhoucoelacanthus guanlingensis
- Guizhouniscus microlepidus
- Habroichthys sp.
- Keichouodus nimaiguensis (Euselachii)
- Luganoia fortuna (Luganoiidae)
- Malingichthys (M. nimaiguensis, M. wanfendlinensis; Pholidophoridae)
- Marcopoloichthys sp.
- Peltopleurus (P. orientalis, P. tyrannos)
- Peripeltopleurus sp. (Wushaichthyidae)
- Pholidophoridae indet.
- Potanichthys xingyiensis (Thoracopteridae)
- Rosaodus xingyiensis (Elasmobranchii)
- Saurichthys sp.
- Sinoeugnathus kueichowensis
- Wushaichthys exquisitus (Wushaichthyidae)
- Xingyia gracilis

=== Reptiles ===
Reptiles of the Zhuganpo Formation
Genus	Species	Notes	Images
Anshunsaurus	A. huangnihensis	An askeptosauroid thalattosaur	Diandongosuchus fuyuanensis Keichousaurus hui Guizhouichthyosaurus
Anshunsaurus	A. wushaensis	An askeptosauroid thalattosaur	Diandongosuchus fuyuanensis Keichousaurus hui Guizhouichthyosaurus
Brevicaudosaurus	B. jiyangshanensis	A small nothosaur with an unusually short torso and tail	Diandongosuchus fuyuanensis Keichousaurus hui Guizhouichthyosaurus
Diandongosuchus	D. fuyuanensis	A semiaquatic archosauriform, interpreted as a basal phytosaur	Diandongosuchus fuyuanensis Keichousaurus hui Guizhouichthyosaurus
Dingxiaosaurus	D. luyinensis	A pistosauroid of uncertain validity. Previously believed to have been from the Yangliujing Formation.	Diandongosuchus fuyuanensis Keichousaurus hui Guizhouichthyosaurus
Fuyuansaurus	F. acutirostris	A "protorosaur" archosauromorph, possibly a tanystropheid	Diandongosuchus fuyuanensis Keichousaurus hui Guizhouichthyosaurus
Glyphoderma	G. kangi	A placochelyid placodont	Diandongosuchus fuyuanensis Keichousaurus hui Guizhouichthyosaurus
Guizhouichthyosaurus	G. sp.	A large predatory merriamosaurian ichthyosaur	Diandongosuchus fuyuanensis Keichousaurus hui Guizhouichthyosaurus
Keichousaurus	K. hui	A keichousaurid pachypleurosaur	Diandongosuchus fuyuanensis Keichousaurus hui Guizhouichthyosaurus
Lariosaurus	L. xingyiensis	A small nothosaur	Diandongosuchus fuyuanensis Keichousaurus hui Guizhouichthyosaurus
Litorosuchus	L. somnii	A semiaquatic archosauriform related to Vancleavea campi	Diandongosuchus fuyuanensis Keichousaurus hui Guizhouichthyosaurus
Macrocnemus	M. fuyuanensis	A small basal tanystropheid	Diandongosuchus fuyuanensis Keichousaurus hui Guizhouichthyosaurus
Nothosaurus	N. youngi	A large nothosaur	Diandongosuchus fuyuanensis Keichousaurus hui Guizhouichthyosaurus
Qianichthyosaurus	Q. xingyiensis	A small toretocnemid ichthyosaur	Diandongosuchus fuyuanensis Keichousaurus hui Guizhouichthyosaurus
Qianxisaurus	Q. chajiangensis	A basal eosauropterygian, possibly related to pachypleurosaurs or nothosaurs	Diandongosuchus fuyuanensis Keichousaurus hui Guizhouichthyosaurus
Tanystropheus	T. cf. hydroides	A large tanystropheid, previously classified as T. cf. longobardicus	Diandongosuchus fuyuanensis Keichousaurus hui Guizhouichthyosaurus
Tanystropheus	T. sp.	A small tanystropheid, previously classified as T. cf. longobardicus	Diandongosuchus fuyuanensis Keichousaurus hui Guizhouichthyosaurus
Wangosaurus	W. brevirostris	A pistosauroid	Diandongosuchus fuyuanensis Keichousaurus hui Guizhouichthyosaurus
Xinpusaurus	X. xingyiensis	A thalattosauroid thalattosaur	Diandongosuchus fuyuanensis Keichousaurus hui Guizhouichthyosaurus
Yunguisaurus	Y. liae	A pistosauroid	Diandongosuchus fuyuanensis Keichousaurus hui Guizhouichthyosaurus
