= Mount Lewis (Nevada) =

Mountain in Nevada, United States

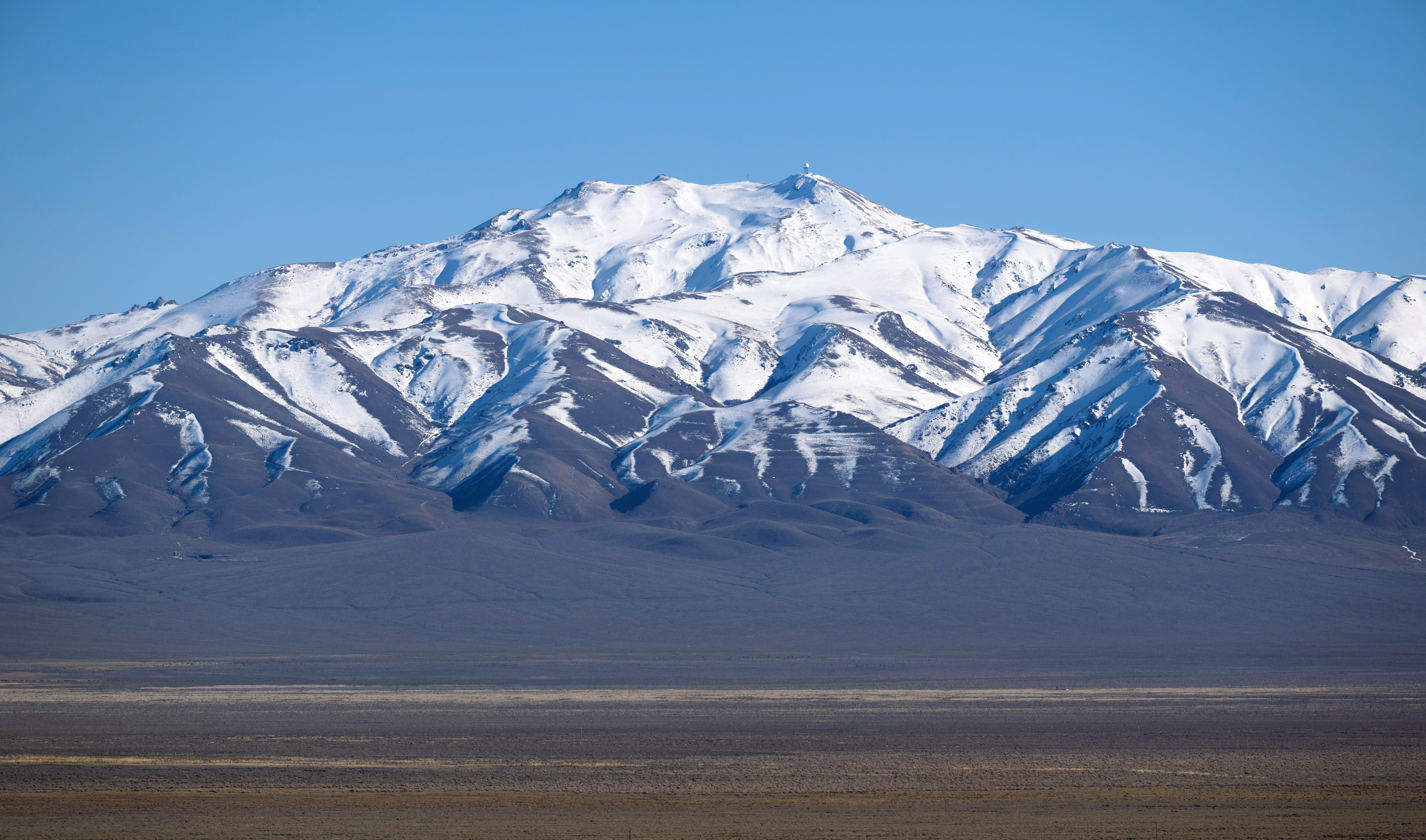
- View of Mount Lewis from near Battle Mountain

Highest point
- Elevation: 9,678 ft (2,950 m) NAVD 88
- Prominence: 4,280 ft (1,305 m)
- Coordinates: 40°24′12″N 116°51′41″W

Geography
- Location within Nevada
- Location: Lander County, Nevada, U.S.
- Parent range: Shoshone Range
- Topo map: USGS MT LEWIS

Climbing
- Easiest route: A well-maintained gravel road ascends directly to the summit

Mount Lewis is the highest peak in the Shoshone Range in Lander County, Nevada, United States. It is the most topographically prominent peak in Lander County and the twentieth-most prominent peak in Nevada. The peak is located about 14 miles (23 km) southeast of the town of Battle Mountain. A Federal Aviation Administration Long Range Air Route Surveillance Radar station is located just west of the summit. The peak is on public land administered by the Bureau of Land Management and thus has no access restrictions.

== Summit panorama ==
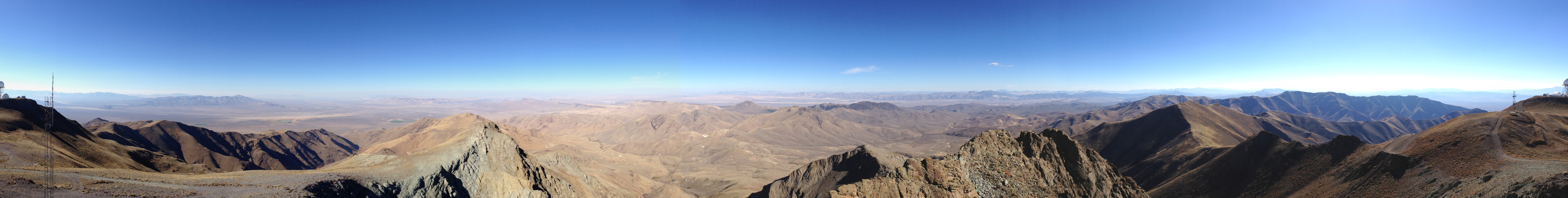
360-degree panorama from the summit of Mount Lewis
