= Reese River =

River in Nevada, United States

Coordinates: 40°47′58″N 117°03′40″W

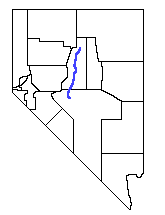
Location of the Reese River within Nevada

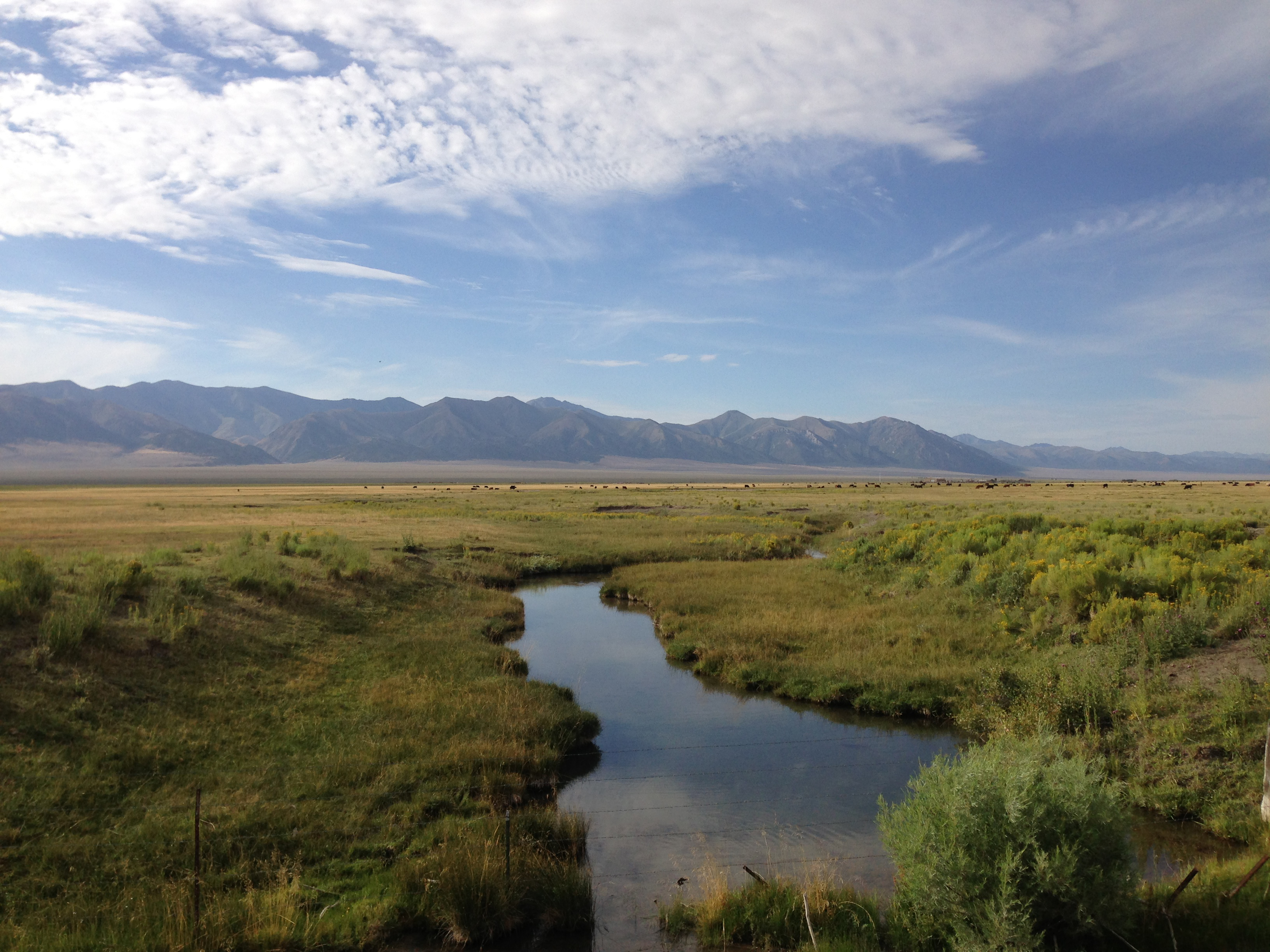
The Reese River near Austin

The Reese River is a 181-mile-long (291 km) tributary of the Humboldt River, located in central Nevada in the western United States.

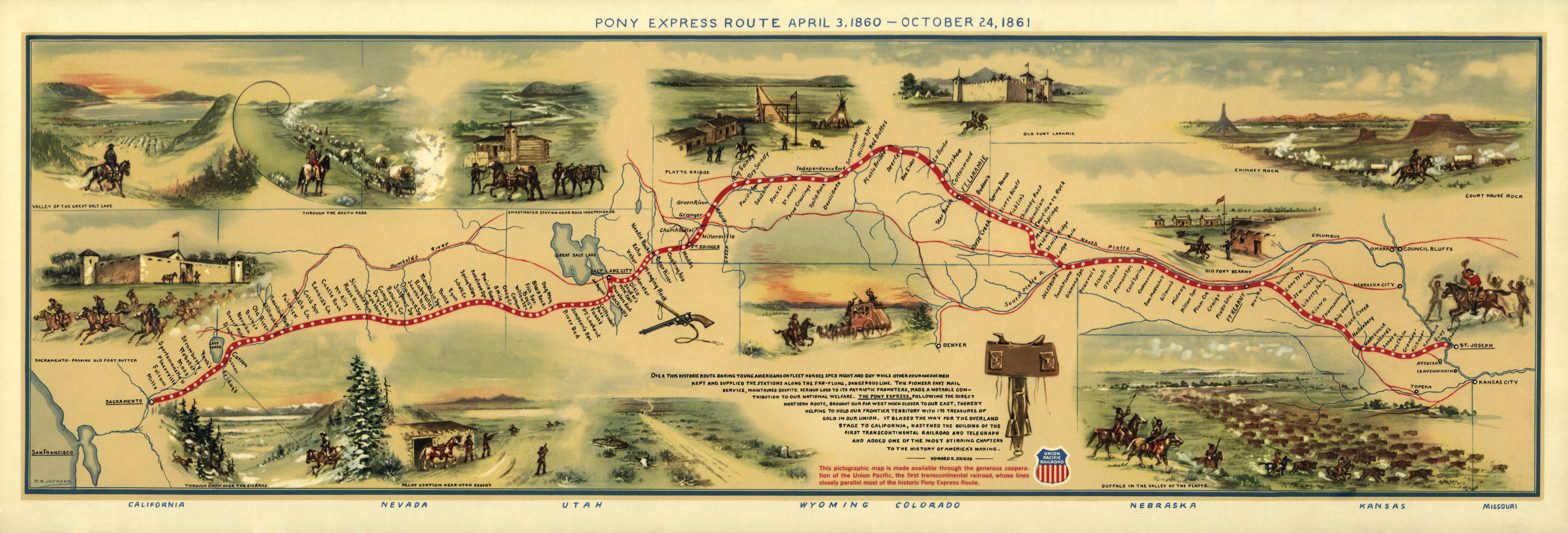
The Reese River Pony Express station was burned during the 1860 Paiute War.

The Reese rises in the southern section of the Toiyabe Range, on the flanks of Arc Dome. In its upper reaches, the Reese River is a fast-flowing mountain stream surrounded by relatively lush growth, including Aspen groves and cottonwood trees. It then flows north between the Toiyabe Range and the Shoshone Mountains for approximately half its length. The river then passes through a low point in the Shoshone Mountains and continues north between that range and the Fish Creek Mountains. Once it exits the Toiyabe Range, it becomes a slow, muddy stream, and its waters are used for irrigation by scattered farms and ranches along its lower reaches. Although considered a tributary of the Humboldt, in most years, the Reese dwindles into a chain of shallow pools long before it reaches the main stem. Only during infrequent floods does the Reese contribute water to the Humboldt, entering near Battle Mountain. Nevada State Route 305 parallels the lower, usually dry portion of the channel from the Austin area to Battle Mountain.

The river is named after John Reese, who explored the area in 1854 as part of the expedition of Colonel Edward Steptoe, and who later served as a guide to Captain James H. Simpson's survey of a military road through central Nevada. The mining boomtown of Austin, located in the upper reaches of the Reese River, names its long-lived newspaper the Reese River Reveille.

== Reese River excitement ==
The Reese River excitement took place in 1862 and 1863 in the river valley. During this period, the area was explored and settled. After Austin was founded, prospectors went south to explore the Toiyabe Range and crossed the border of Lander County and Esmeralda County. Three mining districts were organized in the Toiyabe Range in Esmeralda County, namely Marysville, Twin River, and Washington. Also, several villages and ranches were established in the county. After the Toiyabe Range, the Shoshone Mountains were found, and in 1863 silver was found on the western side of the mountain range. At that place, Union District was organized, and the village Ione was founded.

Nye County was established as a result of the Reese River excitement: inhabitants of Union District signed a petition in which they said the district was far from Aurora and Austin, the county seats of respectively Esmeralda and Lander County. Nye County was created by the Nevada Legislature on February 16, 1864.
