= Shoshone Range =

Mountain range in Nevada, United States

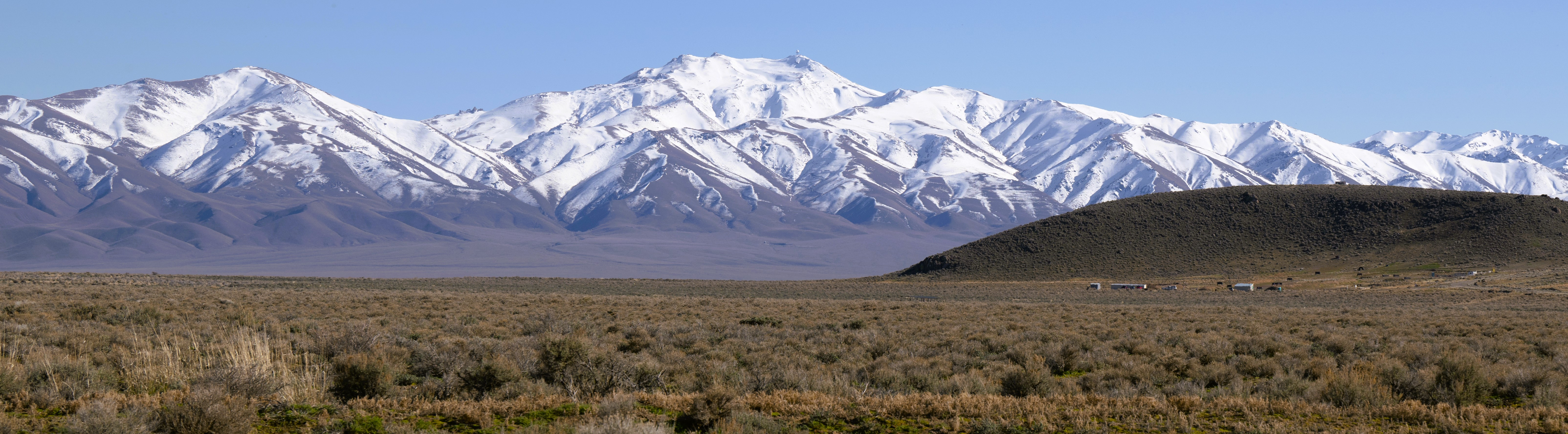
- Looking south with Mount Lewis centered and Bens Peak to the left

Highest point
- Peak: Mount Lewis
- Elevation: 9,678 ft (2,950 m)
- Coordinates: 40°24.2′N 116°51.7′W

Geography
- Location within Nevada
- Country: United States
- State: Nevada
- District: Lander County
- Range coordinates: 40°21′1.701″N 116°53′4.343″W
- Topo map: USGS Goat Peak

The Shoshone Range is a mountain range in Lander County, Nevada. The northeast end of the range extends into Eureka County at Shoshone Point on the Humboldt River.

The range was named from the Shoshoni language meaning "grass".
