= Fish Creek Mountains =

Mountain range in Nevada, United States

- Location within Nevada

Highest point
- Elevation: 1,985 m (6,512 ft)

Geography
- Country: United States
- State: Nevada
- District: Lander County
- Range coordinates: 40°11′36.699″N 117°19′43.384″W
- Topo map: USGS Fish Creek Basin

The Fish Creek Mountains are a mountain range in Lander County, Nevada.
