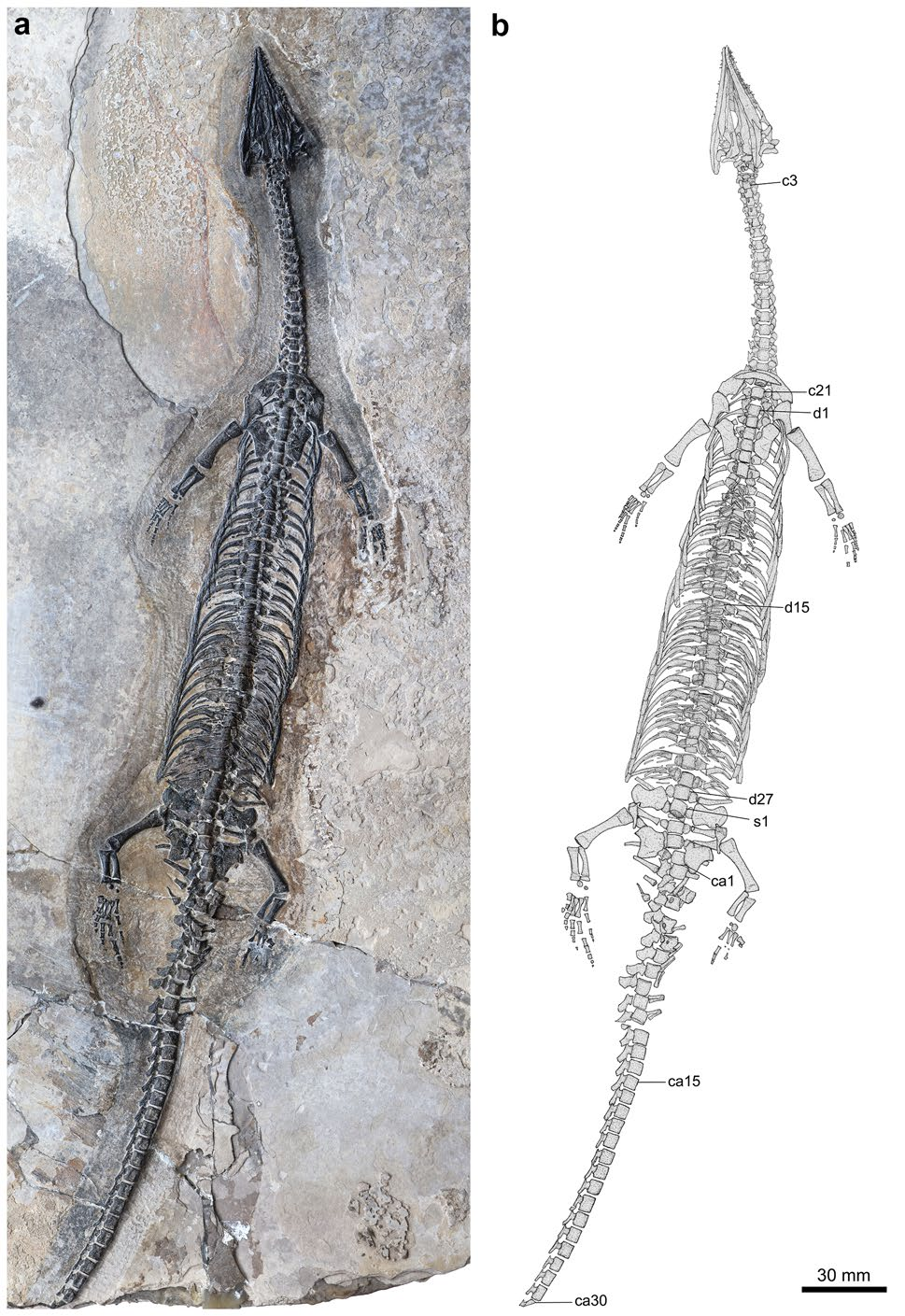
- Luopingosaurus holotype

Scientific classification
- Kingdom: Animalia
- Phylum: Chordata
- Class: Reptilia
- Superorder: †Sauropterygia
- Suborder: †Pachypleurosauria
- Family: †Pachypleurosauridae
- Genus: †Luopingosaurus; Xu et al., 2023
- Species: †L. imparilis

Binomial name
- †Luopingosaurus imparilis Xu et al., 2023

= Luopingosaurus =

Luopingosaurus Temporal range: Middle Triassic (Anisian), ~244 Ma

Extinct genus of sauropterygian reptiles

Luopingosaurus (meaning "Luoping lizard") is an extinct genus of pachypleurosaurid sauropterygian from the Middle Triassic Guanling Formation of Yunnan Province, China. The genus contains a single species, L. imparilis, known from a well-preserved, nearly complete skeleton.

== Discovery and naming ==
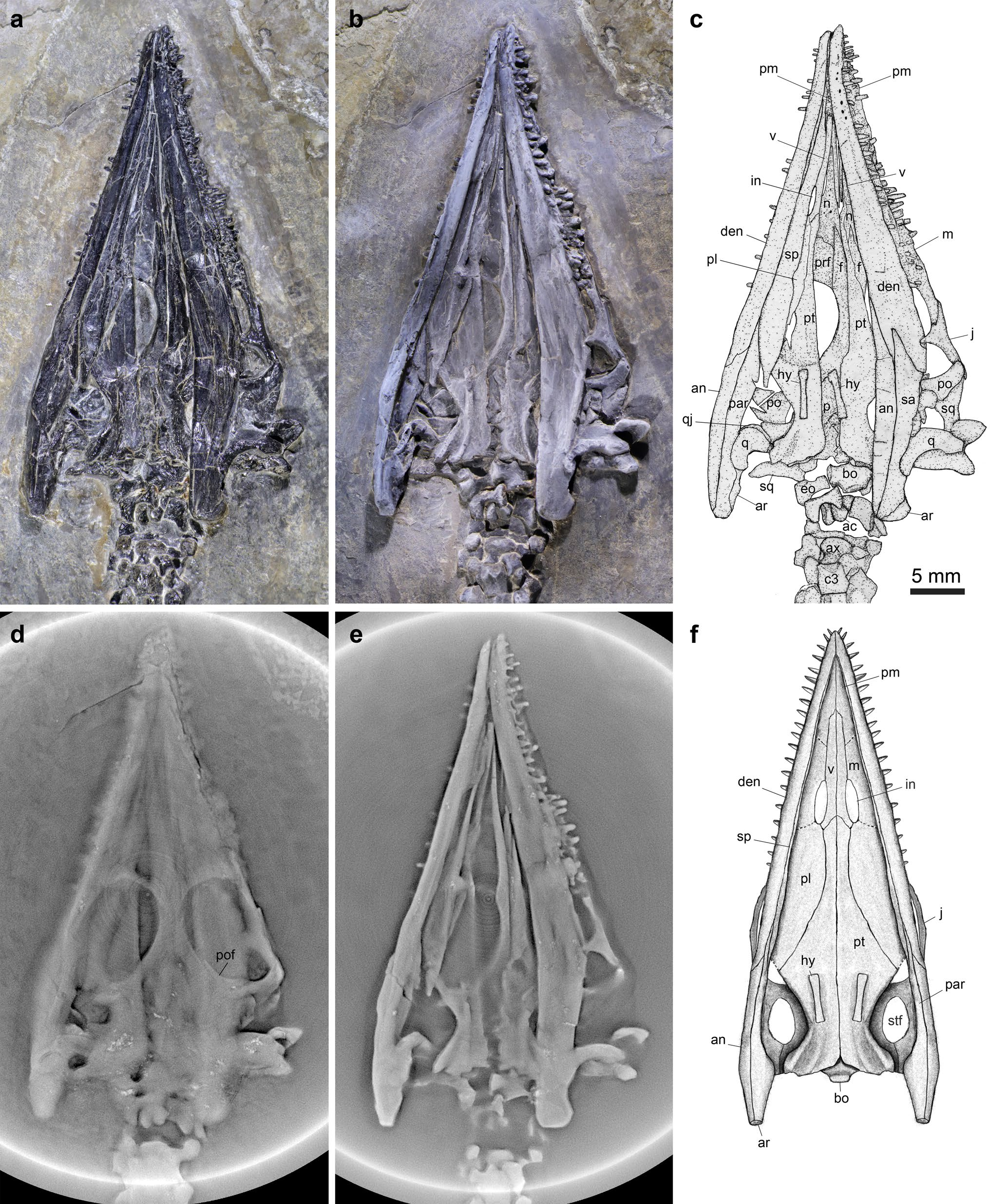
Luopingosaurus skull

The Luopingosaurus holotype specimen, IVPP V19049, was discovered in sediments of the Guanling Formation, dated to the Anisian age (Pelsonian substage) of the middle Triassic period, in Luoping County, Yunnan Province, China. This specimen consists of a nearly complete, ventrally-exposed, articulated individual, lacking only the end of the tail. The preserved portion of the skeleton measures 46.2 centimetres (18.2 in) long.

In 2023, Xu et al. described Luopingosaurus imparilis, a new genus and species of pachypleurosaurid, based on these fossil remains. The generic name, "Luopingosaurus", combines a reference to the type locality in Luoping County with the Greek word "saurus", meaning "lizard". The specific name, "imparilis", means "peculiar" and "unusual" in Latin.

== Description ==
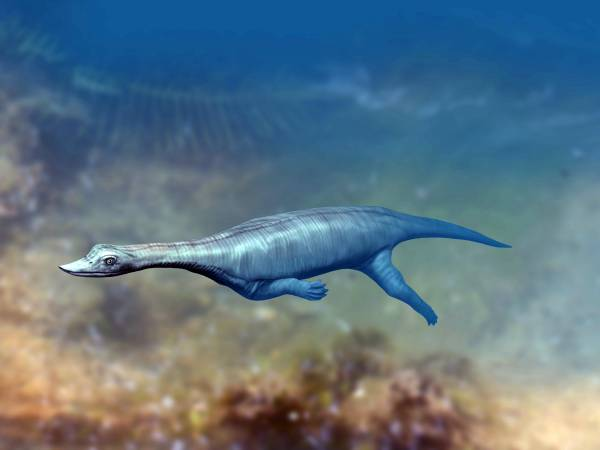
Life restoration of the related, long-snouted Wumengosaurus

Luopingosaurus is one of the largest pachypleurosauroids, with an estimated total body length of 64 centimetres (25 in). It also has an unusually long snout compared to other pachypleurosaurids; the only related taxon with a longer snout is Wumengosaurus, which has occasionally been placed outside of Pachypleurosauroidea by other authors. The evolution of this feature alongside the shorter-snouted keichousaurids may have occurred due to differences in foraging and feeding specializations. The elongated snout may have allowed Luopingosaurus to more effectively catch and hold prey.

Luopingosaurus represents the only known instance of hyperphalangy (an increase in the number of phalanges) in Pachypleurosauroidea, having five phalanges in the third digit as opposed to the plesiomorphic condition of four.

== Classification ==
Xu et al. (2023) recovered Luopingosaurus as a derived pachypleurosaurid member of the Pachypleurosauroidea, as the sister taxon to Honghesaurus. Their results are shown in the cladogram below:

- Sauropterygia
  - Placodontia
  - Hanosaurus
  - Eosauropterygia
    - Pachypleurosauroidea
      - - Majiashanosaurus
        - - Diandongosaurus
          - Dianmeisaurus
      - - - Dawazisaurus
          - - Panzhousaurus
            - - Keichousauridae
                - Dianopachysaurus
                - Keichousaurus
              - Pachypleurosauridae
                - - Dactylosaurus
                  - - Anarosaurus
                    - Odoiporosaurus
                - - - Serpianosaurus
                    - Neusticosaurus
                  - - Prosantosaurus
                    - - Qianxisaurus
                      - - Wumengosaurus
                        - - Luopingosaurus
                          - Honghesaurus
    - Eusauropterygia
      - Nothosauroidea
      - Pistosauroidea
