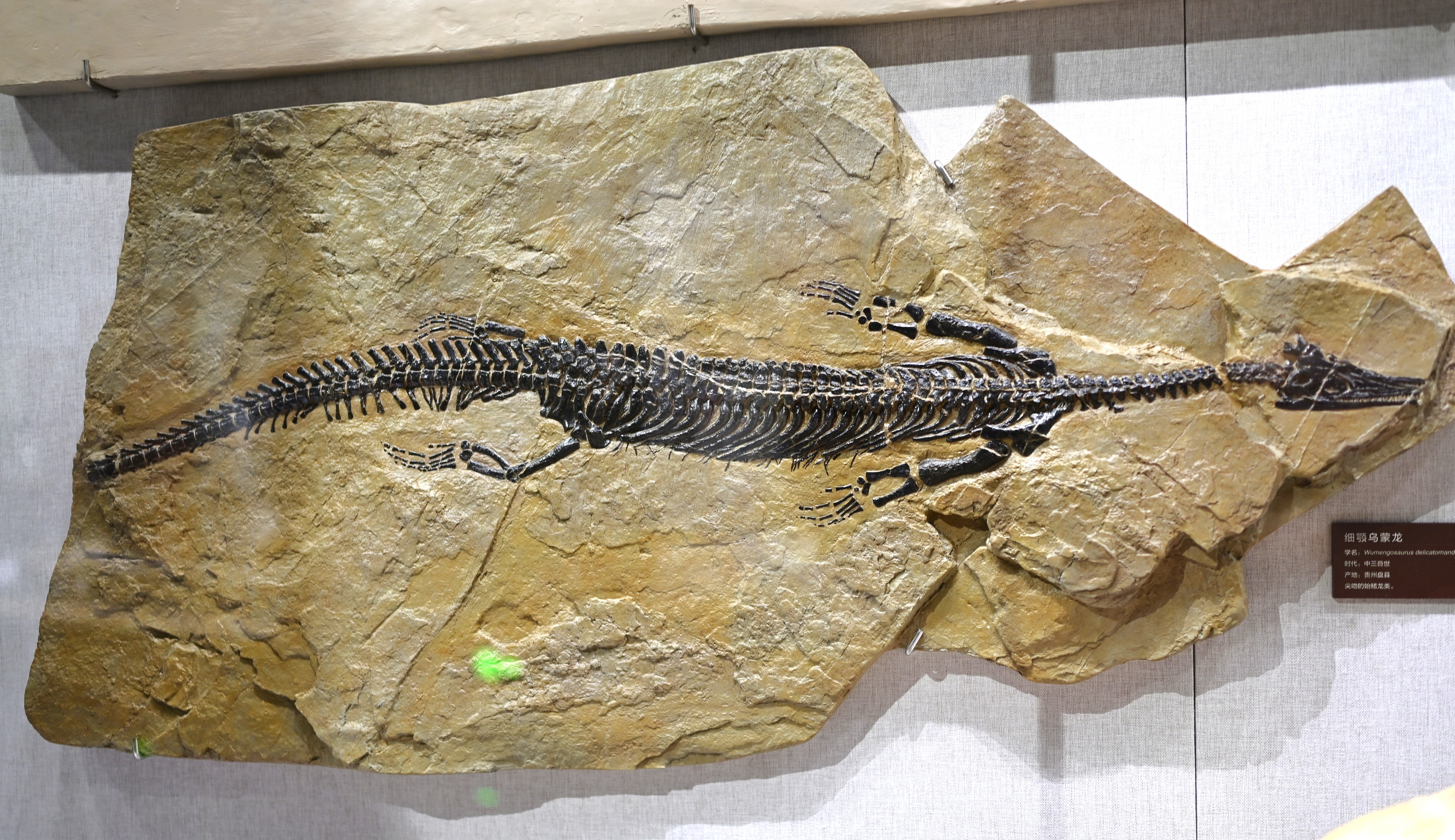
- Fossil specimen of W. delicatomandibulans, Baoding Museum of Natural History

Scientific classification
- Kingdom: Animalia
- Phylum: Chordata
- Class: Reptilia
- Superorder: †Sauropterygia
- Clade: †Eosauropterygia
- Genus: †Wumengosaurus; Jiang et al., 2008

Type species
- †Wumengosaurus delicatomandibularis Jiang et al., 2008

Other species
- †W. rotundicarpus Qin et al. 2021

= Wumengosaurus =

Wumengosaurus Temporal range: Anisian, 247.2–242 Ma

Extinct genus of reptiles

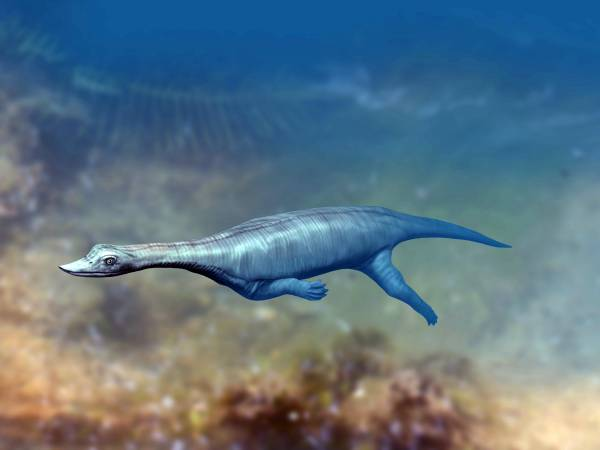
Life restoration

Wumengosaurus is an extinct aquatic reptile from the Middle Triassic (late Anisian stage) Guanling Formation of Guizhou, southwestern China. It was originally described as a basal eosauropterygian and usually is recovered as such by phylogenetic analyses, although one phylogeny has placed it as the sister taxon to Ichthyosauromorpha while refraining from a formal re-positioning. It was a relatively small reptile, measuring 95.5–130.5 cm (3.13–4.28 ft) in total body length.

In 2021, Qin et al. described an additional specimen from Guizhou (Panzhou District) as a new species of Wumengosaurus, W. rotundicarpus.

== Classification ==
In the 2023 description of Luopingosaurus, Xu et al. recovered Wumengosaurus as a derived pachypleurosaurid, as the sister taxon to the clade formed by Luopingosaurus and Honghesaurus. The results of their phylogenetic analyses are shown in the cladogram below:

- Sauropterygia
  - Placodontia
  - Hanosaurus
  - Eosauropterygia
    - Pachypleurosauroidea
      - - Majiashanosaurus
        - - Diandongosaurus
          - Dianmeisaurus
      - - - Dawazisaurus
          - - Panzhousaurus
            - - Keichousauridae
                - Dianopachysaurus
                - Keichousaurus
              - Pachypleurosauridae
                - - Dactylosaurus
                  - - Anarosaurus
                    - Odoiporosaurus
                - - - Serpianosaurus
                    - Neusticosaurus
                  - - Prosantosaurus
                    - - Qianxisaurus
                      - - Wumengosaurus
                        - - Luopingosaurus
                          - Honghesaurus
    - Eusauropterygia
      - Nothosauroidea
      - Pistosauroidea
