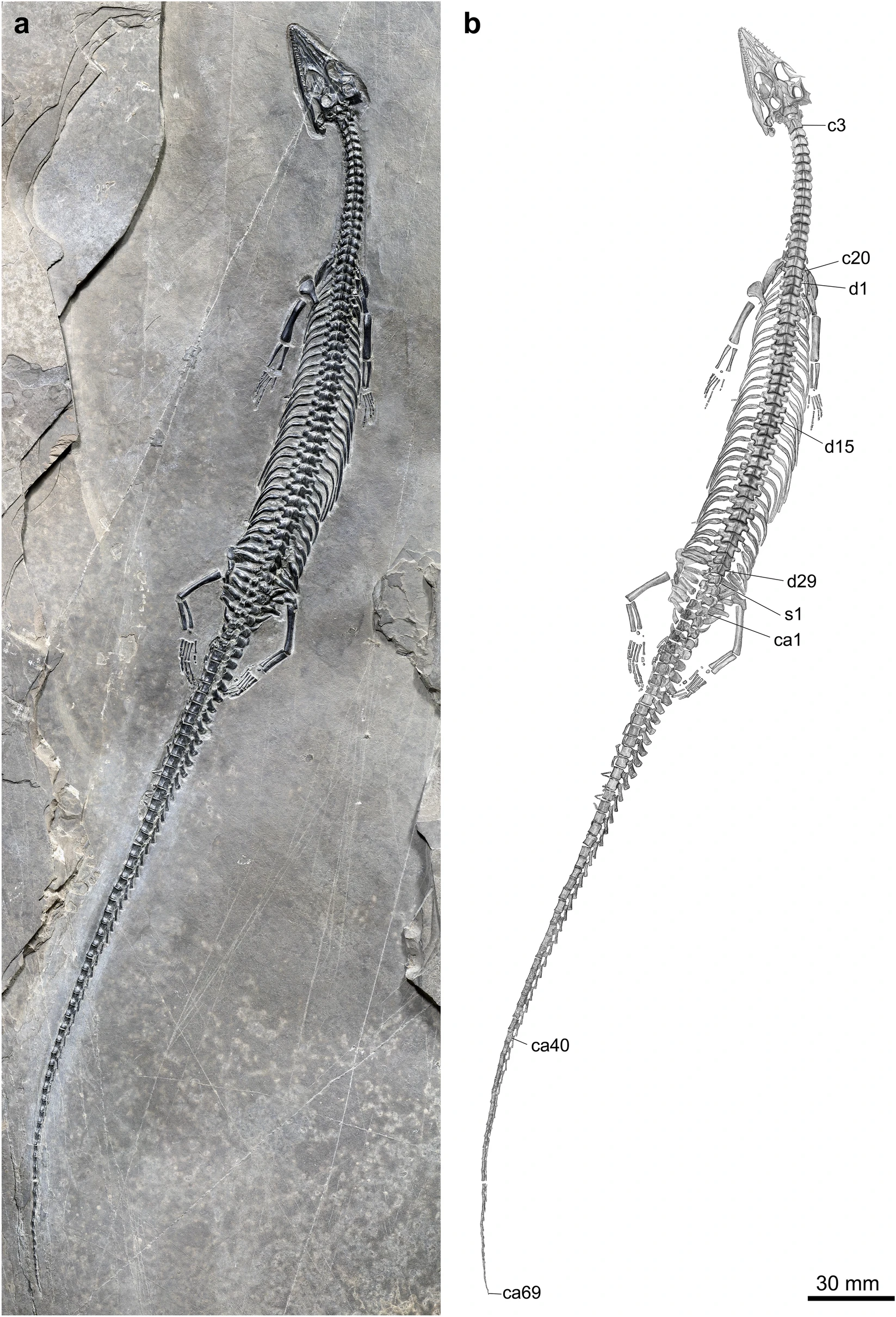
- Photo and line-drawing of holotype specimen (IVPP V30380)

Scientific classification
- Domain: Eukaryota
- Kingdom: Animalia
- Phylum: Chordata
- Class: Reptilia
- Superorder: †Sauropterygia
- Family: †Pachypleurosauridae
- Genus: †Honghesaurus; Xu et al., 2022

Type species
- †Honghesaurus longicaudalis Xu et al., 2022

= Honghesaurus =

Honghesaurus Temporal range: Middle Triassic, Anisian

Extinct genus of pachypleurosaur

Honghesaurus is an extinct genus of pachypleurosaur from the Anisian-age Guanling Formation of China. The type specimen measures about 47.1 cm (18.5 in) in total body length.

== Classification ==
The cladogram below follows Xu and colleagues (2022), when they used Youngina as a reference point for rooting the tree. Using a selection of placodonts resulted in a less resolved topology.

- Pachypleurosauroidea
  - - Majiashanosaurus
    - - Diandongosaurus
      - Dianmeisaurus
  - - Dawazisaurus
    - - Panzhousaurus
      - - Dianopachysaurus
        - Keichousaurus
      - - - Dactylosaurus
          - - Anarosaurus
            - Odoiporosaurus
        - - - Serpianosaurus
            - Neusticosaurus
          - - Qianxisaurus
            - - Honghesaurus
              - Wumengosaurus
