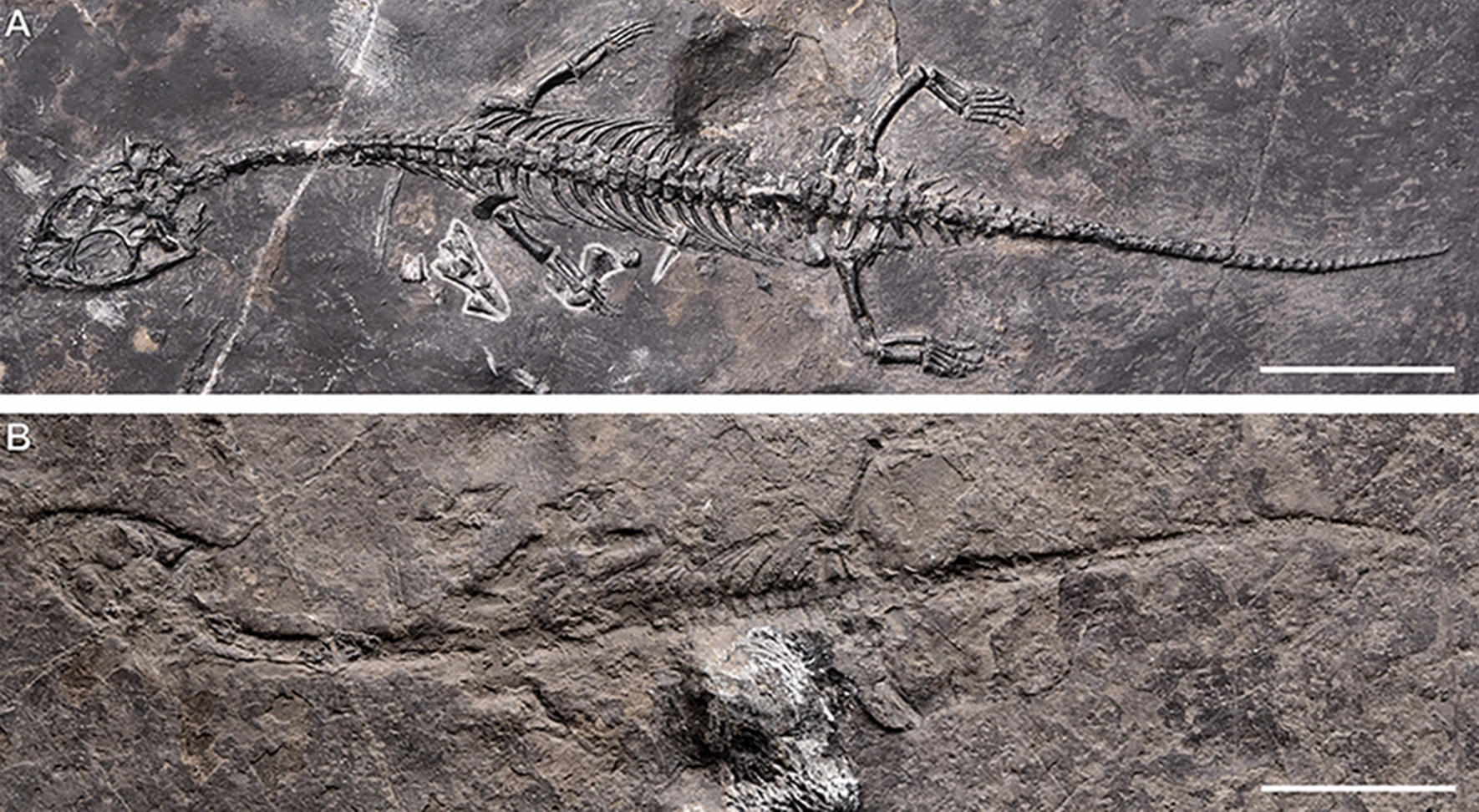
- Holotype specimen of D. mutaensis, likely representing an immature individual

Scientific classification
- Domain: Eukaryota
- Kingdom: Animalia
- Phylum: Chordata
- Class: Reptilia
- Superorder: †Sauropterygia
- Suborder: †Pachypleurosauria
- Genus: †Dianmeisaurus; Shang & Li, 2015

Type species
- †Dianmeisaurus gracilis Shang & Li, 2015

Other species
- †D. mutaensis Hu, Li & Liu, 2024

= Dianmeisaurus =

Dianmeisaurus Temporal range: Middle Triassic, Anisian

Extinct genus of reptiles

Dianmeisaurus is an extinct genus of pachypleurosaur from the Middle Triassic Guanling Formation in China. The type species is D. gracilis. An additional species, D. mutaensis, was named in 2024 based on a small skeleton likely belonging to an immature individual.

== Classification ==
In their 2024 description of Dianmeisaurus mutaensis, Hu, Li & Liu recovered the two species of Dianmeisaurus as the sister taxon to Panzhousaurus in a clade of basally-branching pachypleurosaurs. In their analyses, they recovered the Pachypleurosauria as the sister taxon to the Nothosauroidea. The results of their phylogenetic analyses are shown in the cladogram below:

- Sauropterygia
  - Placodus
  - Eosauropterygia
    - Pistosauridae
    - - Majiashanosaurus
      - - Hanosaurus
        - - Nothosauroidea
          - Pachypleurosauria
            - - Panzhousaurus
              - - Dianmeisaurus gracilis
                - Dianmeisaurus mutaensis
            - - - Dianopachysaurus
                - Dawazisaurus
              - - - Keichousaurus
                  - Diandongosaurus
                - - Odoiporosaurus
                  - - - Anarosaurus
                      - Dactylosaurus
                    - - - Serpianosaurus
                        - Neusticosaurus
                      - - Prosantosaurus
                        - - Qianxisaurus
                          - Honghesaurus
