= Guanling Formation =

Geological formation in China

- Stratigraphic range: Early-Mid Anisian (Pelsonian); ~247–245 Ma
- Type: Geological formation
- Underlies: Yangliujing Formation
- Overlies: Jialingjiang Formation

Lithology
- Primary: Mudstone, limestone
- Other: Dolomite

Location
- Coordinates: 25.5°N 104.9°E
- Approximate paleocoordinates: 11.7°N 94.2°E
- Region: Guizhou & Yunnan Provinces
- Country: China
- Extent: Yunnan–Guizhou Plateau
- Guanling Formation (China) Guanling Formation (Guizhou)

The Guanling Formation is a Middle Triassic (Anisian or Pelsonian in the regional chronostratigraphy) geologic formation in southwestern China.

== Geology ==
The formation encompasses two members. The first member is primarily calcareous mudstone and dolomite, indicative of a coastal environment. The second member is a thicker marine sequence of dark micritic limestone with some dolomite. Two distinct fossil assemblages are found in the second member. The older Luoping biota preserves abundant arthropods (including isopods, decapods, mysidaceans and thylacocephalans) along with fossils from other invertebrates and vertebrates, which are rare but well-preserved. The slightly younger Panxian fauna has a more diverse and common assortment of marine reptiles such as sauropterygians.

A tuff bed in the Luoping biota has been dated to 244.5 ± 2.2 Ma via U-Pb SHRIMP dating. The Luoping biota as a whole was deposited over a period of 340 ± 71 kyr. This estimate is justified by cyclostratigraphic evidence, as indicated by fluctuations of terrestrial proxy metals.

== Fossil content ==
Color key
Taxon	Reclassified taxon	Taxon falsely reported as present	Dubious taxon or junior synonym	Ichnotaxon	Ootaxon	Morphotaxon

Notes
Uncertain or tentative taxa are in small text; ~~crossed out~~ taxa are discredited.

Among others, the following fossils were reported from the formation:

=== Invertebrates ===
==== Arthropoda ====
Arthropods of the Guanling Formation
Genus	Species	Locality	Member	Material	Notes	Image
Acanthochirana	A. spinifera	Luoping Biota	Upper Member	A preserved exoskeleton	An early aegerid prawn	
Anisaeger	A. brevirostrus	Luoping Biota	Upper Member	A preserved exoskeleton	An early aegerid prawn	
Aeger	A. luxii	Luoping Biota	Upper Member	A preserved exoskeleton	An early aegerid prawn	
Atropicaris	A. sinensis	Luoping Biota	Upper Member		A thylacocephalan	
Distaeger	D prodigiosus	Luoping Biota	Upper Member	A preserved exoskeleton	An early aegerid prawn	
Judahella	J. leii	Yunnan	Upper Member	A specimen	An early ostracod	
Koryncheiros	K. luopingensis	Luoping Biota	Upper Member	A preserved exoskeleton	A clytiopsid	
Protamphisopus	P. baii	Dawazi, Luoping and Ranjiazhai village, Guizhou	Upper Member	A preserved exoskeleton	An amphisopid	
Sinopemphix	S. guizhouensis	Dawazi, Luoping	Upper Member	A preserved exoskeleton	A pemphicid	
Sinosoma	S. luopingense	Dawazi, Luoping	Member II	A preserved exoskeleton	A chilognatha	
Tridactylastacus	T. sinensis	Luoping Biota	Upper Member	A preserved exoskeleton	A litogastroid	
Yunnanocopia	Y. grandis	Dawazi and Shangshikan Quarry, Luoping	Upper Member	A carapace	A eucopiid crustacean	
Yunnanocopia	Y. longicauda	Dawazi and Shangshikan Quarry, Luoping	Upper Member	A carapace	A eucopiid crustacean	
Yunnanolimulus	Y. luopingensis	Dawazi, Luoping	Upper Member	A carapace	A limulid (horseshoe crab)	
Yunnanopalinura	Y. schrami	Luoping Biota	Upper Member	A preserved exoskeleton	An early relative of spiny lobsters	

==== Ammonoidea ====
Ammonites of the Guanling Formation
Genus	Species	Locality	Member	Material	Notes	Image
Progonoceratites	P. pulcher	Guizhou		A fossilized shell	A ceratitid ammonite	

==== Bivalvia ====
Bivalves of the Guanling Formation
Genus	Species	Locality	Member	Material	Notes	Image
Asoella	A. illyrica					
Eumorphotis	E. (Asoella) paradoxica					
Myophoria	M. (Costatoria) goldfussi					
Pleuromya	P. elongata					

===== Brachiopoda =====
Brachiopods of the Guanling Formation
Genus	Species	Locality	Member	Material	Notes	Image
Lingula	L. deitersensis					
Lingula	L. marginia					
Lingula	L. polaris					
Pseudospiriferina	P. multicostata					
Pseudospiriferina	P. pinguis					
Punctospirella	P. fragilis					

===== Echinoidea =====
Sea Urchins of the Guanling Formation
Genus	Species	Locality	Member	Material	Notes	Image
Yunnanechinus	Y. luopingensis	Luoping Biota, Yunnan	Member II	A specimen	An early sea urchin	

=== Vertebrates ===
==== Fish ====
Color key: Taxon / Reclassified taxon / Taxon falsely reported as present / Dubious taxon or junior synonym / Ichnotaxon / Ootaxon / Morphotaxon

Notes
Uncertain or tentative taxa are in small text
~~crossed out~~ taxa are discredited.

===== Actinopterygii =====
Ray-finned fish of the Guanling Formation
Genus	Species	Locality	Member	Material	Notes	Image
Altisolepis	A. sinensis	Dawazi, Yunnan	Upper Member	A skeleton	A peltopleurid bony fish	
Diandongichthys	D. ocellatus	Luoping, Yunnan	Upper Member	A complete, laterally compressed specimen	A basal ginglymodian	
Diandongperleidus	D. denticulatus	Dawazi, Yunnan	Upper Member	A preserved skeleton	A perleidiform	
Feroxichthys	F. panzhouensis	Xinmin, Panxian	Upper Member	A skeleton	A colobodontid	
Feroxichthys	F. yunnanensis	Luoping Biota, Yunnan	Upper Member	A skeleton	A colobodontid	
Frodoichthys	F. luopingensis	Dawazi village, Yunnan	Upper Member	A skeleton	An early neopterygian	
Fuyuanperleidus	F. dengi	Dawazi village, Yunnan	Upper Member	A skeleton	A fuyuanperleidid	
Gimlichthys	G. dawaziensis	Dawazi village, Yunnan	Upper Member	A skeleton	An early neopterygian	
Gymnoichthys	G. inopinatus	Dawazi village, Yunnan	Upper Member	A skeleton	An amiiform	
Habroichthys	H. broughi	Dawazi village, Yunnan	Upper Member	A skeleton	A peltopleuriform	
Kyphosichthys	K. grandei	Luoping, eastern Yunnan Province	Upper Member	A complete preserved skeleton	A kyphosichthyiform	
Lashanichthys	L. sui	Yangjuan, Guizhou	Upper Member	A partial skeleton	A lashanichthyid	
Lashanichthys	L. yangjuanensis	Dawazi Village, Yunnan	Upper Member	A skeleton	A lashanichthyid	
Luopingichthys	L. bergi	Dawazi Village, Yunnan	Member II	A skeleton	A louwoichthyiform	
Luoxiongichthys	L. hyperdorsalis	Luoxiong Town, Yunnan	Lower member	A nearly complete skeleton and skull, a partial skull, and other referred materials	A halecomorph	
Louwoichthys	L. pusillus	Yunnan	Member II	A skeleton	A louwoichthyid fish	
Luopingperleidus	L. sui	Dawazi, Yunnan	Upper Member	A skeleton	A perleidid	
Marcopoloichthys	M. ani	Dawazi village, Yunnan	Upper Member	A complete specimen	A teleosteomorph	
Panxianichthys	P. imparilis	Xinmin, Guizhou and Yanjuan	Upper Member	A skeleton	A panxianichthyiform	
Perleidus	P. sinensis	Dawazi village, Yunnan	Upper Member	A specimen	A perleidid	
Platysiagum	P. sinensis	Dawazi, Yunnan	Upper Member	A skeleton	A platysiagid	
Pteronisculus	P. changae	Dawazi village, Yunnan	Upper Member	A skeleton	An early ray-finned fish of uncertain affinites	
Pteronisculus	P. nielseni	Luoping Biota, Yunnan	Upper Member	A skeleton	An early ray-finned fish of uncertain affinites	
Ptycholepis	P. huoae	Luoping Biota, Yunnan	Upper Member		A ptycholepiform	
Robustichthys	R. luopingensis	Luoping Biota, Yunnan	Upper Member	A skeleton	A Ionoscopiform	
Saurichthys	S. dawaziensis	Dawazi village, Yunnan	Upper member	A broad skull and crushing dentition	A saurichthyiform	
Saurichthys	S. spinosa	Dawazi village, Yunnan	Upper member		A saurichthyiform	
Sinosaurichthys	S. longimedialis	Yangjuan, Guizhou and Dawazi of Luoping, Yunnan	Upper Member	A skeleton	A saurichthyiform	
Sinosaurichthys	S. longipectoralis	Yangjuan, Guizhou and Dawazi of Luoping, Yunnan	Upper Member	A skeleton	A saurichthyiform	
Sinosaurichthys	S. minuta	Yangjuan, Guizhou and Dawazi of Luoping, Yunnan	Upper Member	A skeleton	A saurichthyiform	
Subortichthys	S. triassicus	Luoping biota, Yunnan	Member II	A skeleton	A subortichthyid	
Venusichthys	V. comptus	Luoping biota, Yunnan	Member II	Multiple skeletons	A neopterygian in the monotypic family Venusichthyidae	
Yelangichthys	Y. macrocephalus	Xindian, Guizhou	Upper Member	A broad skull and crushing dentition.	A saurichthyiform	
Yudaiichthys	Y. eximius	Luoping biota, Yunnan	Member II	A skeleton	A lashanichthyid	

===== Sarcopterygii =====
Lobe-finned fish of the Guanling Formation
Genus	Species	Locality	Member	Material	Notes	Image
Luopingcoelacanthus	L. eurylacrimalis	Luoping Biota, Yunnan	Upper Member	Multiple skeletons	A coelacanthiform	Luopingcoelacanthus eurylacrimalis
Yunnancoelacanthus	Y. acrotuberculatus	Luoping Biota, Yunnan	Upper Member	A skeleton	A coelacanthiform	

==== Reptiles ====
===== Ichthyosauria =====
Ichthyosaurs of the Guanling Formation
Genus	Species	Locality	Member	Materials	Notes	Image
Barracudasauroides	B. panxianensis	Yangjuan village, Xinmin	Upper Member	A skeleton	A small mixosaurid ichthyosaur; either a member of its own genus or a species of Mixosaurus.	Barracudasauroides Phalarodon Mixosaurus
Mixosaurus	M. kuhnschnyderi	Xinzhai Village, Luoping	Upper Member	A specimen	A small mixosaurid ichthyosaur	Barracudasauroides Phalarodon Mixosaurus
Mixosaurus	M. luxiensis	Huale Village, Luxi	Upper Member	A largely complete but disarticulated skeleton	A small mixosaurid ichthyosaur	Barracudasauroides Phalarodon Mixosaurus
Mixosaurus	M. panxianensis	Yangjuan Hill locality	Middle Member	A skeleton	A small mixosaurid ichthyosaur	Barracudasauroides Phalarodon Mixosaurus
Mixosaurus	M. xindianensis	Xindian, Qingshan Pu'an	Upper Member		A small mixosaurid ichthyosaur	Barracudasauroides Phalarodon Mixosaurus
Phalarodon	P. atavus		Upper Member	A complete skeleton	A small mixosaurid ichthyosaur; might represent a member of its own genus, Contectopalatus.	Barracudasauroides Phalarodon Mixosaurus
Phalarodon	P. fraasi	Yangjuan Village	Upper Member	A skull with durophagous dentition.	A small mixosaurid ichthyosaur	Barracudasauroides Phalarodon Mixosaurus
Xinminosaurus	X. catactes	Near Yangjuan Village, Guizhou	Upper Member	A nearly complete skeleton	A medium-sized early ichthyosaur with durophagous dentition, possibly a member of Cymbospondylidae.	Barracudasauroides Phalarodon Mixosaurus

===== Pseudosuchia =====
Pseudosuchians of the Guanling Formation
Genus	Species	Locality	Member	Materials	Notes	Image
Chirotherium	C. bartheii	Zhenfeng County, Guizhou	Upper Member	Several trackways	A pseudosuchian archosaur	Qianosuchus
Qianosuchus	Q. mixtus	Xinmin, Panxian		Two nearly complete skeletons and a crushed skull	An aquatic poposauroid archosaur	Qianosuchus

===== Sauropterygia =====
Color key: Taxon / Reclassified taxon / Taxon falsely reported as present / Dubious taxon or junior synonym / Ichnotaxon / Ootaxon / Morphotaxon

Notes
Uncertain or tentative taxa are in small text
~~crossed out~~ taxa are discredited.

====== Nothosauria ======
Nothosaurs of the Guanling Formation
Genus	Species	Locality	Member	Materials	Notes	Image
Dawazisaurus	D. brevis	Dawazisaurus-type locality, Yunnan	Member II	A nearly complete skeleton exposed in dorsal view	A sauropterygian of possible nothosauroid affinities	Dawazisaurus Nothosaurus
Dikoposichnus	D. luopingensis	Qingyuan Village, Guizhou, and Luoping Biota, Yunnan	Member I	12 trackways and footprints	A probable nothosaur ichnotaxon	Dawazisaurus Nothosaurus
Lariosaurus	L. hongguoensis	Yangjuan village, Guizhou	Upper Member	A near-complete skeleton	A small Lariosaurinae nothosaur	Dawazisaurus Nothosaurus
Nothosaurus	N. fortihumeralis	Luxi	Upper Member	A partial skeleton consists of the forearm, ribs, hind leg bones, and iliac blade.	A nothosaur	Dawazisaurus Nothosaurus
Nothosaurus	N. rostellatus	Panxian, Guizhou	Upper Member	A complete skull and incomplete postcranial skeleton	A nothosaur	Dawazisaurus Nothosaurus
Nothosaurus	N. yangjuanensis	Panxian, Guizhou	Middle Member	A partial skeleton	A nothosaur	Dawazisaurus Nothosaurus
Nothosaurus	N. zhangi	Bed 165 of the Dawazi section, Yunnan	Upper Member	A complete lower jaw associated with a partial postcranial skeleton	A nothosaur	Dawazisaurus Nothosaurus
Sanchiaosaurus	S. dengi	Sanchiao in the vicinity of Guiyang and Chinchungchiao, Guizhou	Middle member	A partial skeleton	A nothosaur	Dawazisaurus Nothosaurus

====== Pachypleurosauria ======
Pachypleurosaurs of the Guanling Formation
Genus	Species	Locality	Member	Materials	Notes	Image
Diandongosaurus	D. acutidentatus	Dawazi, Yunnan	Member II	A complete and articulated skeleton with skull	A small pachypleurosaur	Luopingosaurus Wumengosaurus
Dianopachysaurus	D. dingi	Dawazi, Luoping	Member II	A near-complete articulated skeleton	A keichousaurid pachypleurosaur	Luopingosaurus Wumengosaurus
Dianmeisaurus	D. gracilis	Luoping, Yunnan	Upper Member	A small skeleton likely belonging to an immature individual	A pachypleurosaur	Luopingosaurus Wumengosaurus
Dianmeisaurus	D. mutaensis	Northwest of Muta village, Luxi	Upper Member	A complete and articulated skeleton exposed in dorsal view	A pachypleurosaur	Luopingosaurus Wumengosaurus
Honghesaurus	H. longicaudalis	Luxi, Yunnan	Member II	A skeleton	A pachypleurosaurid	Luopingosaurus Wumengosaurus
Luopingosaurus	L. imparilis	Luoping, Yunnan	Upper Member	A skeleton	A pachypleurosaurid	Luopingosaurus Wumengosaurus
Panzhousaurus	P. rotundirostris	Dapianpo Quarry from Yangjuan Village, Guizhou	Upper Member	A near-complete skeleton	A pachypleurosaur	Luopingosaurus Wumengosaurus
Wumengosaurus	W. delicatomandibularis	Yangjuan Village, Xinmin	Member II	A skeleton	A small pachypleurosaur	Luopingosaurus Wumengosaurus
Wumengosaurus	W. rotundicarpus	Panzhou, Guizhou	Member II	A specimen	A small pachypleurosaur	Luopingosaurus Wumengosaurus

====== Other sauropterygians ======
Miscellaneous sauropterygians of the Guanling Formation
Genus	Species	Locality	Member	Materials	Notes	Image
Atopodentatus	A. unicus	Dawazi, Yunnan	Upper Member	Three skulls with associated specimens	A bizarre, likely herbivorous sauropterygian	
Placodus	P. inexpectatus	Yangjuan Village, Xinmin	Upper Member	A skeleton	A medium-sized placodontid placodont	
Spatulidentatus	S. breviceps	Border between Yunnan and Guizhou	Upper Member	A skull and skeleton	A probable basal sauropterygian of uncertain affinities	

====== Saurosphargidae ======
Saurosphargidae of the Guanling Formation
Genus	Species	Locality	Member	Materials	Notes	Image
Anshunpes	A. aquacursor	Qingyuan Village, Guizhou	Songzikan Member (Member I)	A trackway consisting of 10 right and 9 left autopodial (?manus) imprints	An ichnotaxon of Saurosphargidae	Sinosaurosphargis
Largocephalosaurus	L. polycarpon	Luoping, Yunnan	Upper Member	A nearly complete and articulated skull and skeleton missing most of its tail	A mid-sized basal saurosphargid sauropterygian	Sinosaurosphargis
Largocephalosaurus	L. qianensis	Panxian, Gauizhou	Upper Member	Multiple specimens	A mid-sized basal saurosphargid sauropterygian	Sinosaurosphargis
Sinosaurosphargis	S. yunguinensis	Yangmazhai of Luoping County, Yunnan and Yangjian of Pan County, Guizhou	Upper Member	Multiple specimens	A small armoured saurosphargid sauropterygian	Sinosaurosphargis

===== Tanysauria =====
Tanysaurians of the Guanling Formation
Genus	Species	Locality	Member	Materials	Notes	Image
Austronaga	A. minuta	Waina Village, Yunnan	Member II	A nearly complete skull articulated, the first six cervical vertebrae, and 65 caudal vertebrae	A trachelosaurid	Dinocephalosaurus Pectodens
Dinocephalosaurus	D. orientalis	Paxian, Gaizhou and Luoping, Yunnan	Member II	Multiple specimens	A trachelosaurid	Dinocephalosaurus Pectodens
Gracilicollum	G. latens	Near Xinmin Village in Panzhou, Guizhou	Member II	A skull and partial neck	A probable trachelosaurid	Dinocephalosaurus Pectodens
Luxisaurus	L. terrestris	Near Suomeiluo in Luxi County, Yunnan	Upper Member	An articulated partial skeleton	A tanystropheid	Dinocephalosaurus Pectodens
Pectodens	P. zhenyuensis	Luoping, Yunnan	Member II	A well-preserved and near-complete skeleton	A small trachelosaurid	Dinocephalosaurus Pectodens
