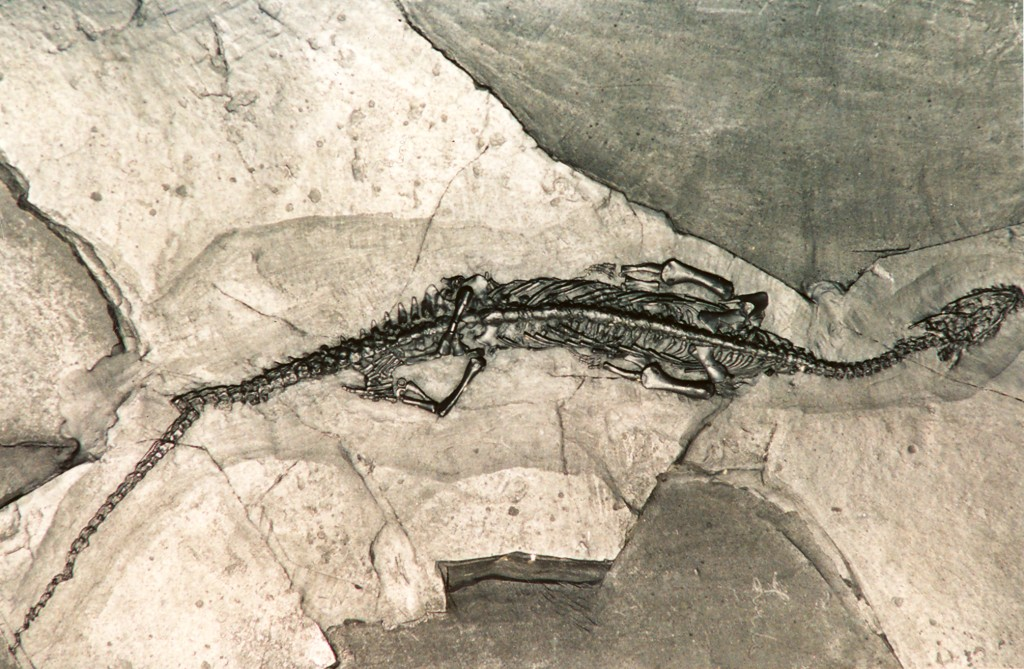
- Fossil specimen of the pachypleurosaur Neusticosaurus edwardsii

Scientific classification
- Domain: Eukaryota
- Kingdom: Animalia
- Phylum: Chordata
- Class: Reptilia
- Superorder: †Sauropterygia
- Clade: †Eosauropterygia
- Suborder: †Pachypleurosauria; Nopcsa, 1928

Genera
- †Dawazisaurus?; †Diandongosaurus; †Dianmeisaurus; †Hanosaurus?; †Honghesaurus; †Majiashanosaurus; †Panzhousaurus; †Qianxisaurus; †Wumengosaurus; †Keichousauridae; †Dianopachysaurus; †Keichousaurus; †Pachypleurosauridae; †Anarosaurus; †Chusaurus; †Dactylosaurus; †Luopingosaurus; †Neusticosaurus; †Odoiporosaurus; †Prosantosaurus; †Serpianosaurus

= Pachypleurosauria =

Pachypleurosaurs Temporal range: Induan-Carnian, 251–227 Ma

Extinct suborder of reptiles

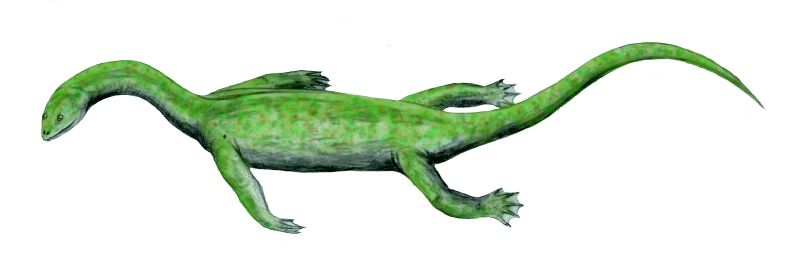
Life restoration of the pachypleurosaur Keichousaurus

Pachypleurosauria is an extinct clade of primitive sauropterygian reptiles from the Triassic period. Pachypleurosaurs vaguely resembled aquatic lizards, with elongate forms ranging in size from 0.2–1 metre (0.66–3.28 ft), with small heads, long necks, paddle-like limbs, and long, deep tails. The limb girdles are greatly reduced, so it is unlikely these animals could move about on land. The widely spaced peg-like teeth project at the front of the jaws, indicating that these animals fed on fish. In the species Prosantosaurus, it was observed that they fed on small fishes and crustaceans which they devoured entirely and that its teeth regrew after they broke off. This was the first observation of tooth replacement in a European pachypleurosaur, with the only other discovery of such an event having been made in China.

== Classification ==
Pachypleurosaurs were traditionally included within the Nothosauroidea (Carroll 1988, Benton 2004). In some more recent cladistic classifications, however, (Rieppel 2000), they are considered the sister group to the Eosauropterygia, the clade that also includes the nothosaurs and pistosauroids. In the 2023 description of Luopingosaurus, Xu et al. supported a similar hypothesis, recovering Pachypleurosauroidea as the sister taxon to the Eusauropterygia. The results of their phylogenetic analyses are shown in the cladogram below:

- Sauropterygia
  - Placodontia
  - Hanosaurus
  - Eosauropterygia
    - Pachypleurosauroidea
      - - Majiashanosaurus
        - - Diandongosaurus
          - Dianmeisaurus
      - - - Dawazisaurus
          - - Panzhousaurus
            - - Keichousauridae
                - Dianopachysaurus
                - Keichousaurus
              - Pachypleurosauridae
                - - Dactylosaurus
                  - - Anarosaurus
                    - Odoiporosaurus
                - - - Serpianosaurus
                    - Neusticosaurus
                  - - Prosantosaurus
                    - - Qianxisaurus
                      - - Wumengosaurus
                        - - Luopingosaurus
                          - Honghesaurus
    - Eusauropterygia
      - Nothosauroidea
      - Pistosauroidea

== Sources ==
- Benton, M. J. (2004), Vertebrate Paleontology, 3rd ed. Blackwell Science Ltd
- Carroll, R.L. (1988), Vertebrate Paleontology and Evolution, WH Freeman & Co.
- Rieppel, O., (2000), Sauropterygia I, placodontia, pachypleurosauria, nothosauroidea, pistosauroidea: In: Handbuch der Palaoherpetologie, part 12A, 134pp. Verlag Dr. Friedrich Pfeil Table of contents
