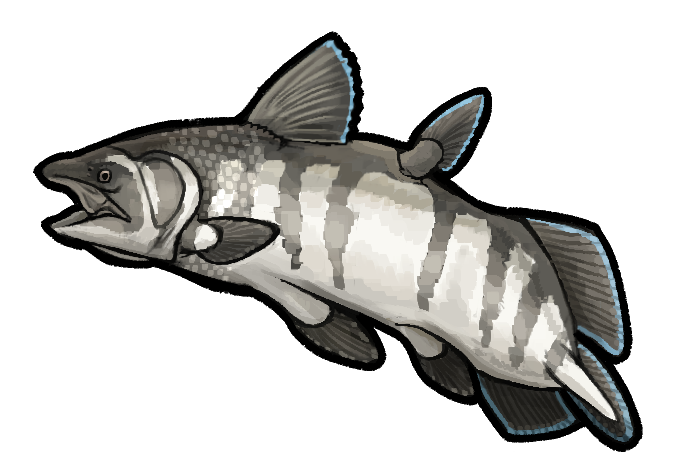

Scientific classification
- Kingdom: Animalia
- Phylum: Chordata
- Class: Actinistia
- Order: Coelacanthiformes
- Genus: †Luopingcoelacanthus
- Species: †L. eurylacrimalis

Binomial name
- †Luopingcoelacanthus eurylacrimalis Wen et al., 2013

= Luopingcoelacanthus =

Luopingcoelacanthus Temporal range: Anisian

Extinct genus of fishes

Luopingcoelacanthus is an extinct genus of coelacanth that lived during the Anisian stage of the Middle Triassic epoch.

== Distribution ==
Luopingcoelacanthus eurylacrimalis is known from the Guanling Formation of China.
