= Yunnancoelacanthus =

Yunnancoelacanthus Temporal range: Anisian
- Skull diagram

Scientific classification
- Kingdom: Animalia
- Phylum: Chordata
- Class: Actinistia
- Order: Coelacanthiformes
- Genus: †Yunnancoelacanthus
- Species: †Y. acrotuberculatus

Binomial name
- †Yunnancoelacanthus acrotuberculatus Wen et al., 2013

Extinct genus of fishes

Yunnancoelacanthus is an extinct genus of coelacanthiform that lived during the Anisian stage of the Middle Triassic epoch.

== Distribution ==
Yunnancoelacanthus acrotuberculatus is known from the Guanling Formation of China.
