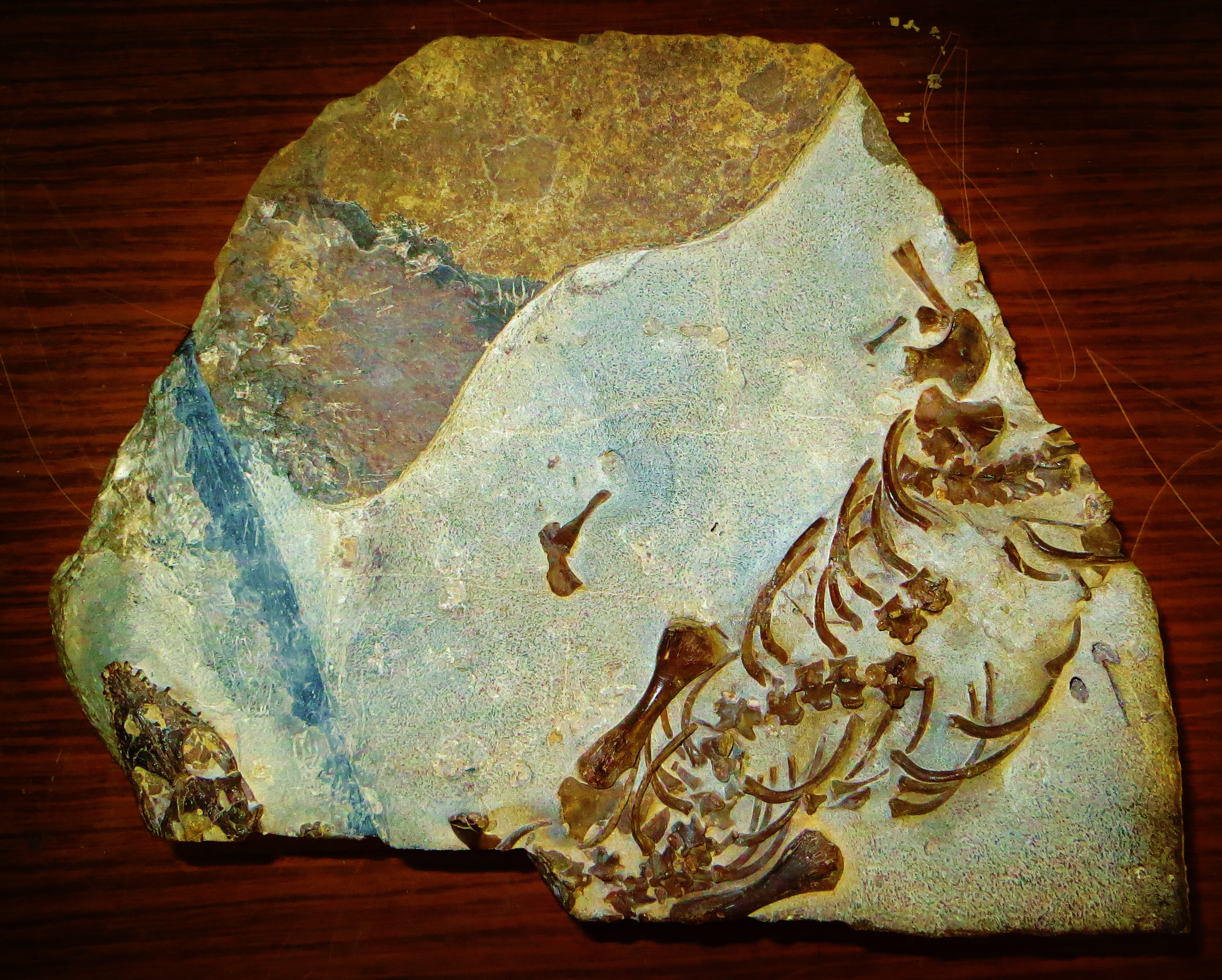
- Fossil in Museo di Storia Naturale di Milano

Scientific classification
- Domain: Eukaryota
- Kingdom: Animalia
- Phylum: Chordata
- Class: Reptilia
- Superorder: †Sauropterygia
- Family: †Pachypleurosauridae
- Genus: †Odoiporosaurus; Renesto et al., 2014

Type species
- †Odoiporosaurus teruzzii Renesto et al., 2014

= Odoiporosaurus =

Odoiporosaurus Temporal range: Middle Triassic, Anisian

Extinct genus of reptiles

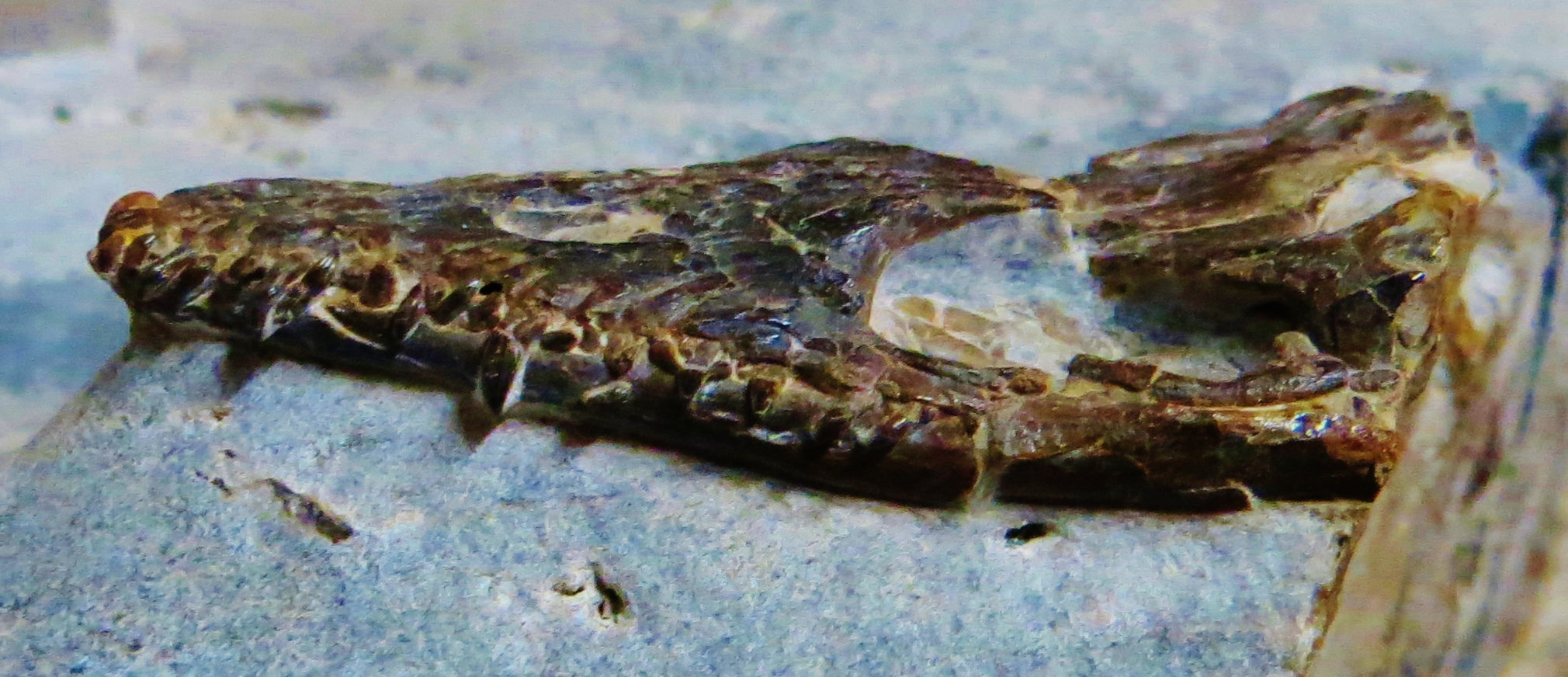
Skull

Odoiporosaurus is an extinct genus of pachypleurosaur known from the Middle Triassic (middle Anisian stage) Besano Formation (Grenzbitumenzone) of northern Italy. It contains a single species, Odoiporosaurus teruzzii. Odoiporosaurus is the sister taxon of the group formed by Serpianosaurus and Neusticosaurus, and together with the older and more primitive Dactylosaurus plus Anarosaurus clade, they form a monophyletic group of European pachypleurosaurids.
