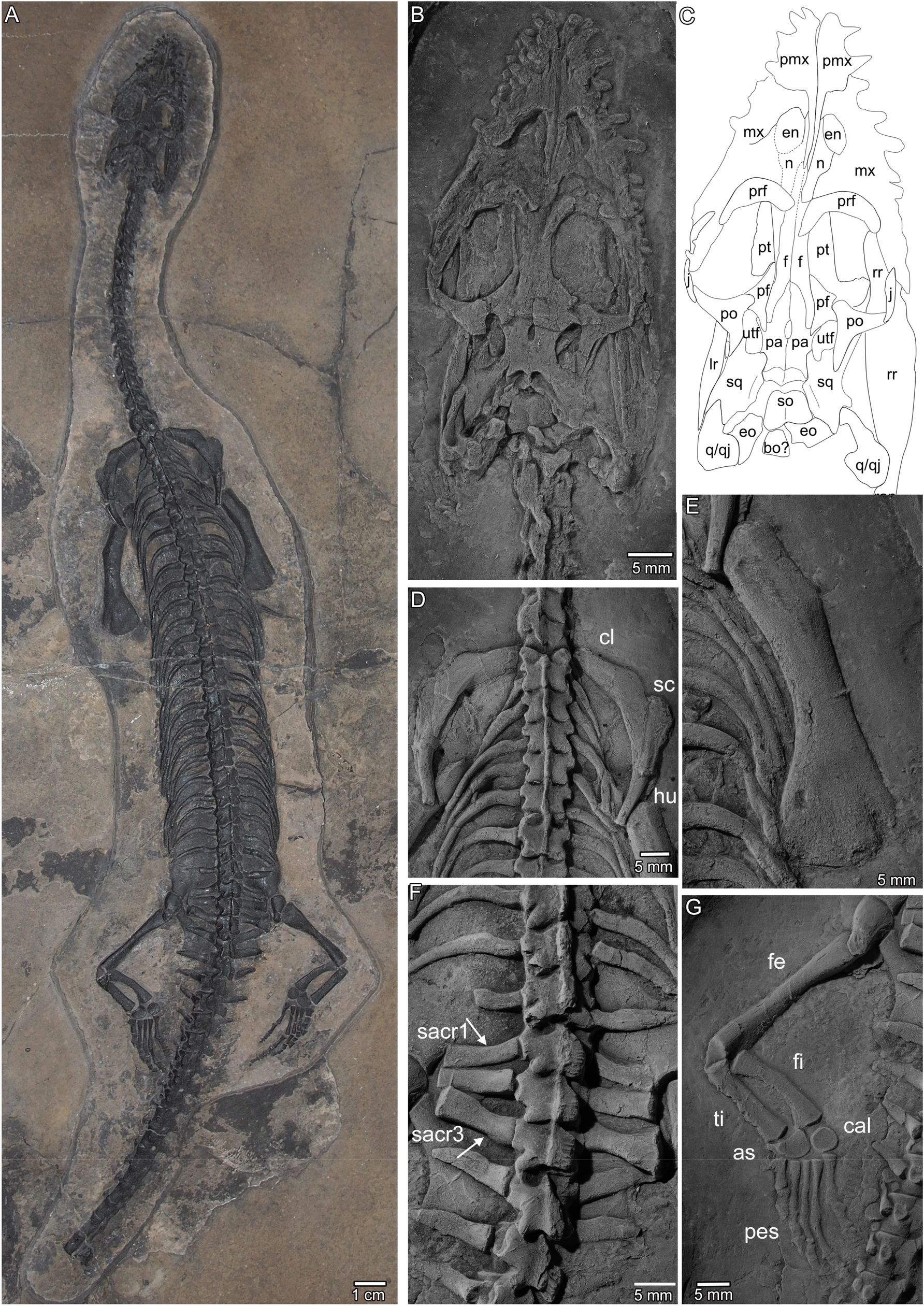
- Holotype specimen (PIMUZ A/III 1274)

Scientific classification
- Domain: Eukaryota
- Kingdom: Animalia
- Phylum: Chordata
- Class: Reptilia
- Superorder: †Sauropterygia
- Genus: †Prosantosaurus; Klein et al., 2022
- Species: †P. scheffoldi

Binomial name
- †Prosantosaurus scheffoldi Klein et al., 2022

= Prosantosaurus =

Prosantosaurus Temporal range: Ladinian

Extinct genus of sauropterygian

Prosantosaurus is a monotypic genus of pachypleurosaurian sauropterygian containing the single species Prosantosaurus scheffoldi discovered in Canton Grison of Switzerland. The genus is named after the Prosanto Formation near the Ducan mountains, where the skeletons were found, and the species for Beat Scheffold, a scientific illustrator from Zurich who contributed prominently to the research of the Triassic marine reptiles.

== Discovery ==
Six skeletons of the species have been discovered within lime and marlstone sediments of the Upper Prosanto Formation in the Ducanfurgga southeast of Davos, Canton Grisons, at about 2700 m above sea level. They have been dated to the very early Ladinian of the Triassic period. Today, the Ducan mountains are located about 100 km (62 mi) northeast of Mount San Giorgio, a UNESCO world heritage site where other pachypleurosauria were found. In the past, the two locations have been up to 200 km (120 mi) apart from each other. The skeletons are accessible in the palaeontological institute of the University of Zurich.

== Description ==
Prosantosaurus scheffoldi were 50 cm (20 in) long lizard-like vertebrates inhabiting the coastal areas of the Tethys Ocean in the Mesozoic era. The Tethys Ocean covered large parts of the present-day Switzerland. Their teeth are less pointed and also broader at their basis from comparable pachypleurosaurs. If its teeth broke off, they regrew. The regrowing teeth were observed for the first time on a European pachypleurosaurus, the other discovery having occurred on a pachypleuosaurus in China. Prosantosaurus were carnivores and it is assumed they fed on small fishes and crustaceans which it swallowed whole after hunting them down. Other bones that differ from other known pachypleurosaurus are those at the calvaria and the rostrum. Research comparing the new species to other European pachypleurosaurs such as Anarosaurus or Neusticosaurus has been conducted by a team of palaeontologists at the University of Zurich.
