= Sanchiaosaurus =

Sanchiaosaurus Temporal range: Middle Triassic, Anisian

Scientific classification
- Domain: Eukaryota
- Kingdom: Animalia
- Phylum: Chordata
- Class: Reptilia
- Superorder: †Sauropterygia
- Order: †Nothosauroidea
- Genus: †Sanchiaosaurus; Young, 1965

Type species
- †Sanchiaosaurus dengi Young, 1965

Extinct genus of reptiles

Sanchiaosaurus is an extinct genus of a basal nothosauroid known from the Middle Triassic (Anisian age) of Guizhou Province, southwestern China. It contains a single species, Sanchiaosaurus dengi.

== Discovery ==
Sanchiaosaurus is known solely from the holotype IVPP V3228, a partial skeleton housed at the Institute of Vertebrate Paleontology and Paleoanthropology. This skeleton is exposed in ventral view, i.e. from below, and preserves the skull and lower jaw, 1 isolated tooth and a partially preserved postcranial skeleton. IVPP V.3228 was collected near the Jinzhong Bridge, in the suburbs of Guiyang City, Chinchungchiao, Sanchiao in the vicinity of Guiyang, Guizhou Province, from the first member of the Guanling Formation, dating to the Anisian stage of the early Middle Triassic, about 245 million years ago.

== Etymology ==
Sanchiaosaurus was first described and named by Yang Zhongjian, also known as Chung-Chien Young, in 1965 and the type species is Sanchiaosaurus dengi. The generic name is derived from Sanchiao, in reference to the locality where the holotype was found, and from Greek sauros, meaning "lizard", a common suffix for genus names of extinct reptile.
