= Qianxisaurus =

Qianxisaurus Temporal range: Ladinian, 242–237 Ma

Scientific classification
- Domain: Eukaryota
- Kingdom: Animalia
- Phylum: Chordata
- Class: Reptilia
- Superorder: †Sauropterygia
- Clade: †Eosauropterygia
- Genus: †Qianxisaurus; Cheng et al., 2012

Type species
- †Qianxisaurus chajiangensis Cheng et al., 2012

Extinct genus of reptiles

Qianxisaurus is an extinct genus of pachypleurosaur or alternatively a basal eosauropterygian known from the Middle Triassic (Ladinian age) of Guizhou Province, southwestern China. It contains a single species, Qianxisaurus chajiangensis.

== Discovery ==
Qianxisaurus is known solely from the holotype NMNS-KIKO-F044630, a nearly complete and articulated skeleton missing only the tip of the tail and the right hindlimb, housed at the National Museum of Natural Science in Taichung, Taiwan. The holotype is exposed mostly in a view from above, with the tail gradually turning to left side view. The skull measures at 7.6 cm (3.0 in) in length, and the total length of the individual is estimated to have been over 80 cm (2 ft 7 in). Only the first 31 tail vertebrae are preserved, out of at least 42-48 vertebrae that are expected to comprise the tail based on other closely related pachypleurosaurs, which implies a total body length longer than 80 cm for this individual. NMNS-KIKO-F044630 was discovered in 2006 near the Huangnihe River at Chajiang of Xingyi, southwesternmost Guizhou Province. It was most probably collected from the Zhuganpo Member of the Falang Formation based on field expeditions to the area in 2006, somewhere between the Geju railway station and Chajiang railway station along the east side of the river which is the provincial boundary between Guizhou and Yunnan, thus dating to the Ladinian stage of the late Middle Triassic, about 238 million years ago.

== Etymology ==
Qianxisaurus was first described and named by Yen-Nien Cheng, Xiao-Chun Wu, Tamaki Sato and Hsi-Yin Shan in 2012 and the type species is Qianxisaurus chajiangensis. The generic name is derived from Qianxi, which refers to the western part of Guizhou Province where the holotype was found, a spelling based on the Chinese Pinyin, and from Greek saûros (σαῦρος), Latinized as saurus, meaning "lizard", a common suffix for genus names of extinct reptiles. The specific name is derived from Chajiang, a town near which the specimen was collected, with the edition of the Latin suffix -ensis, meaning "from".

== Description ==
Qianxisaurus is a basal eosauropterygian, potentially related to Nothosauroidea, with an estimated total body length of at least 80 cm (2 ft 7 in). Originally considered to be a juvenile of the nothosaurid Lariosaurus due to the presence of four sacral vertebrae, further preparation revealed its unique skull roof and dentition morphology. Qianxisaurus bears a premaxilla with eight teeth, contributing a small portion to the elongated oval external naris, teeth with a slightly constricted peduncle and a short conical crown, and a very small supratemporal fenestra, only slightly larger than the foramen of the parietal bone. These autapomorphic traits are unique to Qianxisaurus among all known eosauropterygians. Other unusual traits include a snout longer than the rest of skull, an irregular shape of postorbital bone with a truncated projection of the top surface and a forked projection of the back surface, short and stout retroarticular process that is not concave but truncated in its back portion, a relatively long body with 28 back vertebrae, the presence of four sacral vertebrae, ribs which are not pachyostotic, and a coracoid with a narrow, column-shaped side portion and a widened, foot-shaped mid portion. Qianxisaurus shares the presence of a longitudinal groove on upper-back-facing surface of dorsal ribs exclusively with the potential basal pistosauroids Corosaurus, Sanchiaosaurus, Kwangsisaurus and Chinchenia.
