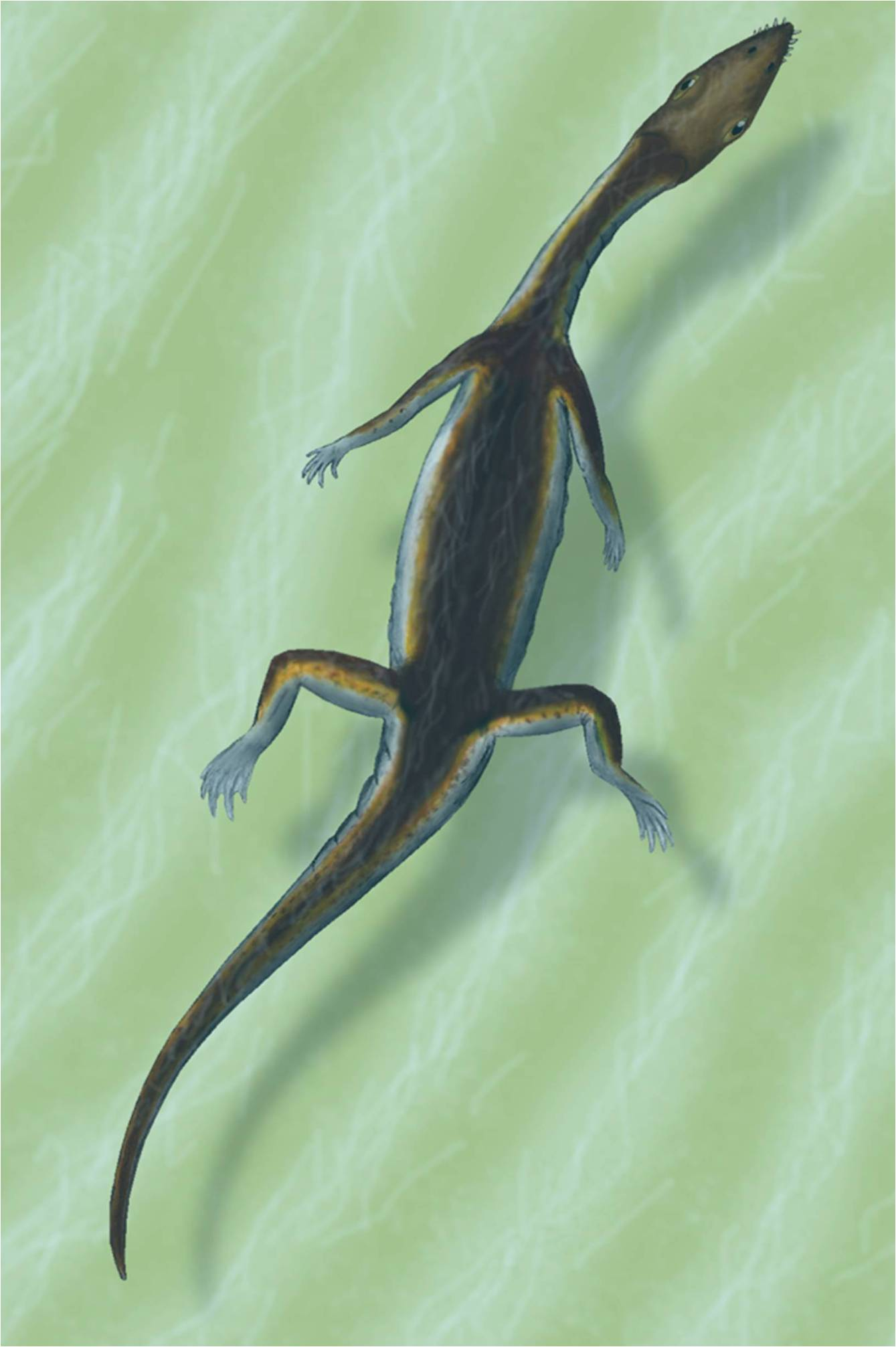
- Life restoration of Serpianosaurus mirigiolensis

Scientific classification
- Kingdom: Animalia
- Phylum: Chordata
- Class: Reptilia
- Superorder: †Sauropterygia
- Suborder: †Pachypleurosauria
- Family: †Pachypleurosauridae
- Genus: †Serpianosaurus; Rieppel, 1989

Type species
- †Serpianosaurus mirigiolensis Rieppel, 1989

Species
- †S. mirigiolensis Rieppel, 1989 (type); †S. germanicus Diedrich, 2013

= Serpianosaurus =

Serpianosaurus Temporal range: Anisian-Ladinian ~242 Ma

Extinct genus of reptiles

Serpianosaurus (meaning "Serpiano lizard") is an extinct genus of pachypleurosaurs known from the Middle Triassic (late Anisian and early Ladinian stages) deposits of Switzerland and Germany. It was a small reptile, with the type specimen of S. mirigiolensis measuring 75 cm (2.46 ft) long.

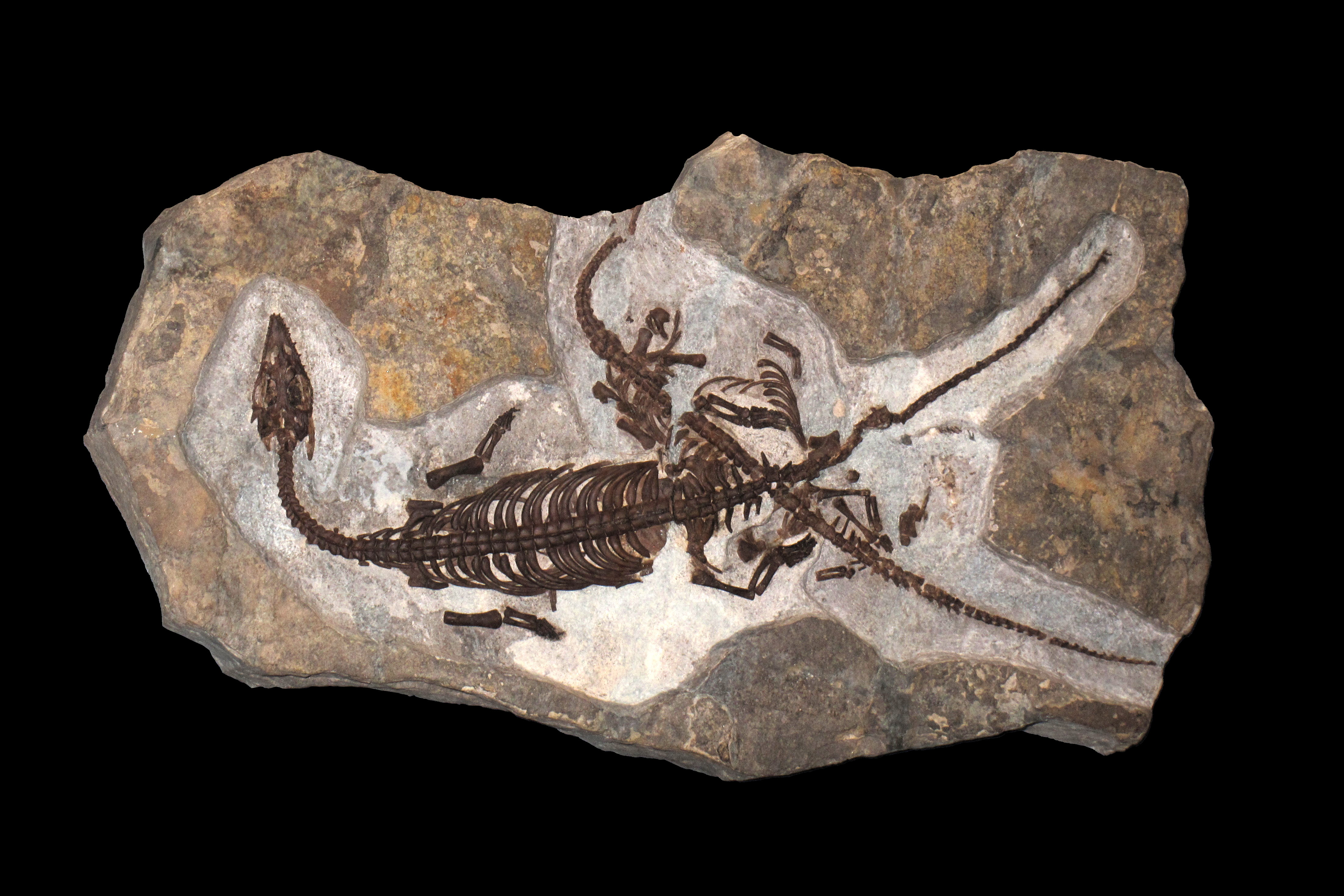
Serpianosaurus mirigiolensis on display at the Paleontological Institute and Museum of the University of Zurich

Fossils of the type species, S. mirigiolensis, have been found from the middle Grenzbitumenzone, the oldest strata of Monte San Giorgio in Switzerland, an area well known for its abundant pachypleurosaur remains. The locality dates back to sometime around the Anisian/Ladinian boundary of the Middle Triassic, around 242 Ma, with Serpianosaurus most likely occurring strictly during the latest Anisian. This makes it one of the oldest sauropterygians from Monte San Giorgio, with only the rare pachypleurosaur Odoiporosaurus being older. Certain aspects of its morphology also suggest it is one of the most basal forms.

In 2013, Cajus G. Diedrich described and named a second species of the genus, S. germanicus, based on a postcranial skeleton and various additional isolated remains from the Karlstadt Formation in Germany. This species represents the oldest well-known record of this genus, as it comes from the upper Pelsonian, dating to the late Anisian stage of the Middle Triassic.

Serpianosaurus can be distinguished from other closely related pachypleurosaurs by its proportionally large skull and straight jaw. Like many other pachypleurosaurs, sexual dimorphism can be seen in Serpianosaurus. Males and females are thought to differ in humeral size and shape. Any pachyostosis of the ribs is absent in Serpianosaurus specimens. It is considered closely related to the genus Neusticosaurus.
