= Dactylosaurus =

Scientific classification
- Kingdom: Animalia
- Phylum: Chordata
- Class: Reptilia
- Superorder: †Sauropterygia
- Suborder: †Pachypleurosauria
- Family: †Pachypleurosauridae
- Genus: †Dactylosaurus; Gürich, 1884

Type species
- †Dactylosaurus gracilis Gürich, 1884

Synonyms
- Dactylosaurus schroederi Nopcsa, 1928 (junior synonym for D. gracilis)

Extinct genus of reptiles

Dactylosaurus is a genus of nothosaur in the family Pachypleurosauridae. Along with Anarosaurus, Dactylosaurus was one of the earliest known pachypleurosaurs to come from Europe.

== Etymology ==
Dactylosaurus comes from the Greek daktulos (δακτυλος), "finger" and sauros (σαυρος), meaning "lizard" or "reptile."

== Description ==
Dactylosaurus was a small reptile measuring up to 50 cm (1.6 ft) long. The nasal bones of Dactylosaurus meet and are broadly structured. The upper temporal fenestra is large and kidney-shaped. There are 17 cervical vertebrae and the cervical ribs have anterior processes. The maxillae of Dactylosaurus extended broadly up the side of the snout.

=== D. gracilis ===
The holotype specimen (MGUWR WR 3871s) of D. gracilis was only a partial skeleton, consisting of the anterior end alone. Because it differed slightly from the fossils of D. gracilis, it was first thought to belong to the species D. schroederi, which is now considered a junior synonym for juvenile D. gracilis. Once this was established, the juvenile fossil, which was found before the adult fossils, became the holotype. The one limb that was found (a left forelimb), was noted to have a slimmer radius and ulna than Neusticosaurus, a similar nothosaur from Europe. D. gracilis is the smallest known species in its family, which includes the much more recognized Keichousaurus, a nothosaur often remembered for its small size. The original holotype of D. gracilis is considered a juvenile, however the size of a nothosaur when its bones harden is used to show size, making the estimate as smallest member of its family still valid.

== Distribution ==
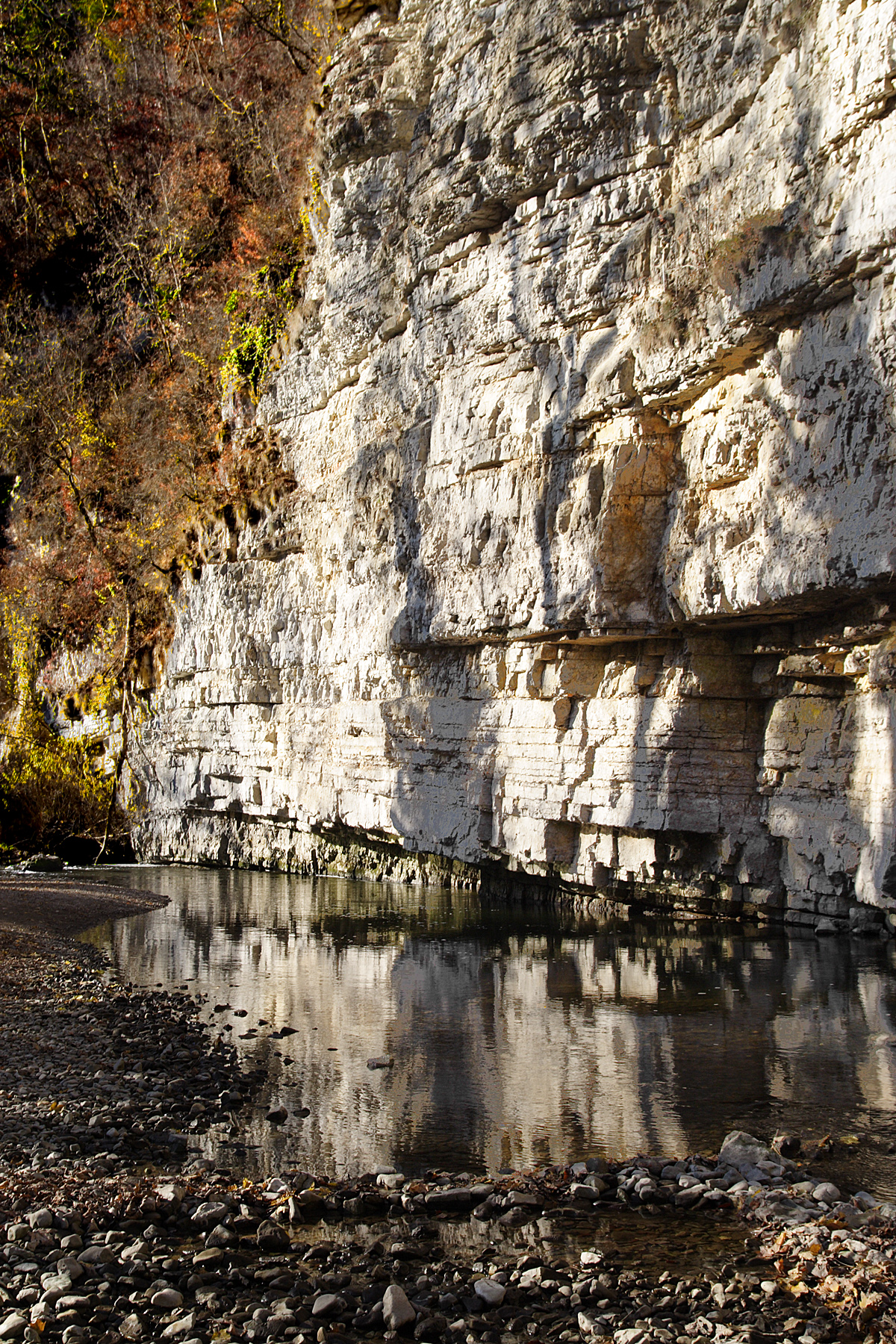
Muschelkalk, a German form of shelly limestone, occasionally produces Dactylosaurus fossils in its lowest layers.

Dactylosaurus lived in the Early and Middle Triassic period during the Late Olenekian and Anisian faunal stage, of central Europe.

In terms of geology, they are found: 1) in the uppermost Röt (uppermost Buntsandstein; Lower Triassic): e.g. Michałkowice (Siemianowice Śląskie) and Kamień Śląski, S Poland, (the second location is not sure because Röt is not exposed there), 2) in the lowermost Muschelkalk (Middle Triassic), inter alia in the Gogolin Formation - Gogolin and its vicinity, S Poland.

In 2012, the new Röt site (~ 247 Ma; Lower Triassic; the latest Olenekian) with abundant disarticulated remains of Dactylosaurus was found in Gogolin. Presently, this in the only site where Dactylosaurus remains are accessible to collect.
