= Dianopachysaurus =

Dianopachysaurus Temporal range: Anisian, 247.2–242 Ma

Scientific classification
- Kingdom: Animalia
- Phylum: Chordata
- Class: Reptilia
- Superorder: †Sauropterygia
- Suborder: †Pachypleurosauria
- Family: †Keichousauridae
- Genus: †Dianopachysaurus; Liu et al., 2011

Type species
- †Dianopachysaurus dingi Liu et al., 2011

Extinct genus of reptiles

Dianopachysaurus is an extinct genus of pachypleurosaur known from the lower Middle Triassic (Anisian age) of Yunnan Province, southwestern China. It was found in the Middle Triassic Lagerstätte of the Guanling Formation. It was first named by Jun Liu, Olivier Rieppel, Da-Yong Jiang, Jonathan C. Aitchison, Ryosuke Motani, Qi-Yue Zhang, Chang-Yong Zhou and Yuan-Yuan Sun in 2011 and the type species is Dianopachysaurus dingi, thanking a Professor Ding for his help.

Dianopachysaurus is most closely related to Keichousaurus, another Chinese pachypleurosaur. Both belong to the family Keichousauridae. Pachypleurosaurs are hypothesized to have originated in the eastern Tethys Ocean (South China) before spreading and diversifying in the western Tethys in what is now Europe. A large ghost lineage of eastern pachypleurosaurs has long been inferred based on the phylogeny of the group. Dianopachysaurus represents an early stage in the radiation of pachypleurosaurs and its early age fills in much of the gap.

== Description ==
The holotype, and only fossil so far, is an almost complete articulated skeleton. It measured 14.3 cm (5.6 in) long from nose tip to the last caudal vertebra known, although the end of the tail is missing after the 17th caudal vertebra. It is estimated to have measured about to 20 cm (7.9 in) in total body length.

=== Skull ===
The skull is broad and flat, with the eyes quite far forward and the snout shorter than the postorbital region. Much of the occipital region has been covered by the displaced cervical vertebrae, so it is not visible and cannot be studied easily, but there appears to be no occipital crest. The premaxillae are quite broad, and form the anterior margin of the naris. They show some weak signs of snout constriction, being slightly narrower than the rest of the skull, but it is not very pronounced. At the very anterior end of the rostrum they are fused. The maxillae are partially covered, and only a few maxillary teeth are at all visible, all smaller than the premaxillary teeth. They extend back, forming the posterolateral border of the naris and the lateral border of the orbit to just beyond the midpoint. A few striations are visible on the maxillae. The nares are small, only 1.5 millimetres (0.059 in) long, and almost square or trapezoid. The nasal bones are elongated and thin, but still shorter than the frontals. They are separated anteriorly by the posterior process of the premaxillae, but meet in a suture posteriorly. There are many small pits present on their surfaces. The orbit is large, at 6 millimetres (0.24 in) in diameter, but has no scleral ossicles present. The prefrontals form the anterior border of the orbit, and are raised in a large ridge just in front of it. The frontals are fully fused into one large bone, and this forms the small ridge between the orbits, which were on the top of the head. Its most noticeable feature is the two processes extending backwards into the parietal almost up to the pineal foramen. The postfrontals are triradiate and come between the orbits and the upper temporal fenestrae, but their anterior processes are mostly covered by the postorbitals. The jugals are very reduced, only thin slivers of bone bounding the orbits and just touching the upper temporal fenestrae. They form no part of the upper temporal arch. The upper temporal fenestrae are only 4.5 mm long, and much thinner, making them relatively small. There is only one parietal, as it is completely fused, and this bounds much of both upper temporal fenestrae and forms most of the upper temporal arch. It is quite broad and flat, but uniquely to this species there is a weak constriction where it meets the squamosals. The pineal foramen is close to the centre of the parietal, but slightly anteriorly displaced. Very small pits are present on the surface of the parietal bone. The postorbitals are quite small, and there is weak sculpturing on the posterior processes. The squamosals, which form the posterior margins of the upper temporal fenestrae, are large and triradiate, with forked anterior processes. Their lateral processes just descend to meet the lower jaw. The quadratojugal is barely exposed at all, but the quadrate is just noticeable near the location of the occipital condyle. Only part of the supraoccipital is exposed, but it has a deeply concave posterior margin. The surangular, which is only exposed in the postorbital region, has no lateral ridge, and the angular is very small. A small fragment of splenial is exposed, but the dentary is barely visible and no teeth can be seen.

=== Vertebrae ===
20 cervical vertebrae, 19 dorsal vertebrae, 3 sacral vertebrae and at least 17 caudal vertebrae are present. The atlas, axis and eighth-tenth cervical vertebrae are disarticulated, as is the posterior-most region of the tail (in fact missing). The dorsal vertebrae have no elongated transverse processes, but the zygapophyses are very pachyostotic.

=== Ribs ===
The cervical ribs are double-headed and start from the third cervical vertebra. The dorsal ribs are single-headed, significantly more elongate, and highly pachyostotic. The last dorsal rib is noticeably shorter than the preceding one, but still much longer than the following sacral ribs. It points laterally instead of trending towards the ilium. The sacral ribs are all articulated with the ilium but do not fuse to their vertebrae. The first caudal rib is far away from the ilium, but trends towards it.

=== Pectoral girdle and forelimbs ===
The clavicles are attached to the medial edge of the scapulae. The scapulae have highly developed dorsal wings, which are posteriorly directed and taper to blunt points. The proximal ends of the humeri are mostly covered by the scapulae, and the deltapectoral flanges are not highly developed. The humeri are 10 mm long, and have unequal attachments for the ulnae and radii. The ulnae is no wider than the radii are, and they are both 5 mm long. An unknown carpal bone, probably an intermedium as it is quite elongate, is preserved between the ulna and radius of the right forelimb and there are three rounded carpal elements preserved in the left forelimb, one of which is the ulnare. The phalangeal formula is not known due to incomplete preservation.

=== Pelvic girdle and hindlimbs ===
The ilia have a triangular acetabulum, and a reduced but still quite robust dorsal process. The pubis is round, and has an open obdurator foramen, but the ischium is almost entirely hidden. The femurs are slender and slightly sigmoid, with distinct striations on both ends. They are 14 mm long. The fibulae are slightly longer than the tibiae, at 6.5 rather than 6 mm long. The astragali are larger than the calcanea, but both have flat proximal margins. The first metatarsals are distinctly shorter than the others, and many metatarsals are covered by phalanges and so not fully visible. Enough phalanges are preserved in their original positions, however, to let us see that all the most distal phalanges have pointed tips, which may originally have been claws, and to give a probable phalangeal formula for the foot of 2,3,4,5,4.
