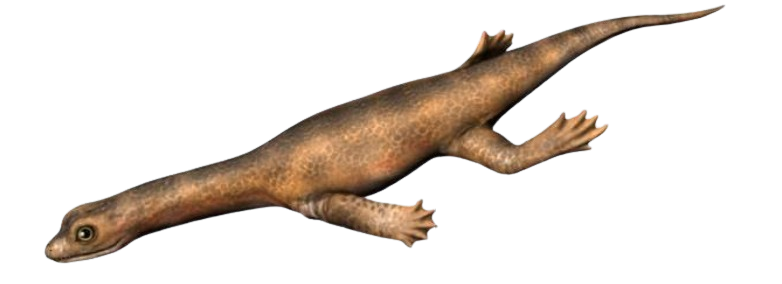
- Life reconstruction of M. discocoracoidis

Scientific classification
- Kingdom: Animalia
- Phylum: Chordata
- Class: Reptilia
- Superorder: †Sauropterygia
- Clade: †Eosauropterygia
- Genus: †Majiashanosaurus; Jiang et al., 2014

Type species
- †Majiashanosaurus discocoracoidis Jiang et al., 2014

= Majiashanosaurus =

Majiashanosaurus Temporal range: Early Triassic, 248 Ma

Extinct genus of reptiles

Majiashanosaurus is an extinct genus of pachypleurosaur or alternatively a basal eosauropterygian known from the Early Triassic (Olenekian age) of Anhui Province, eastern China. It contains a single species, Majiashanosaurus discocoracoidis.

== Discovery ==
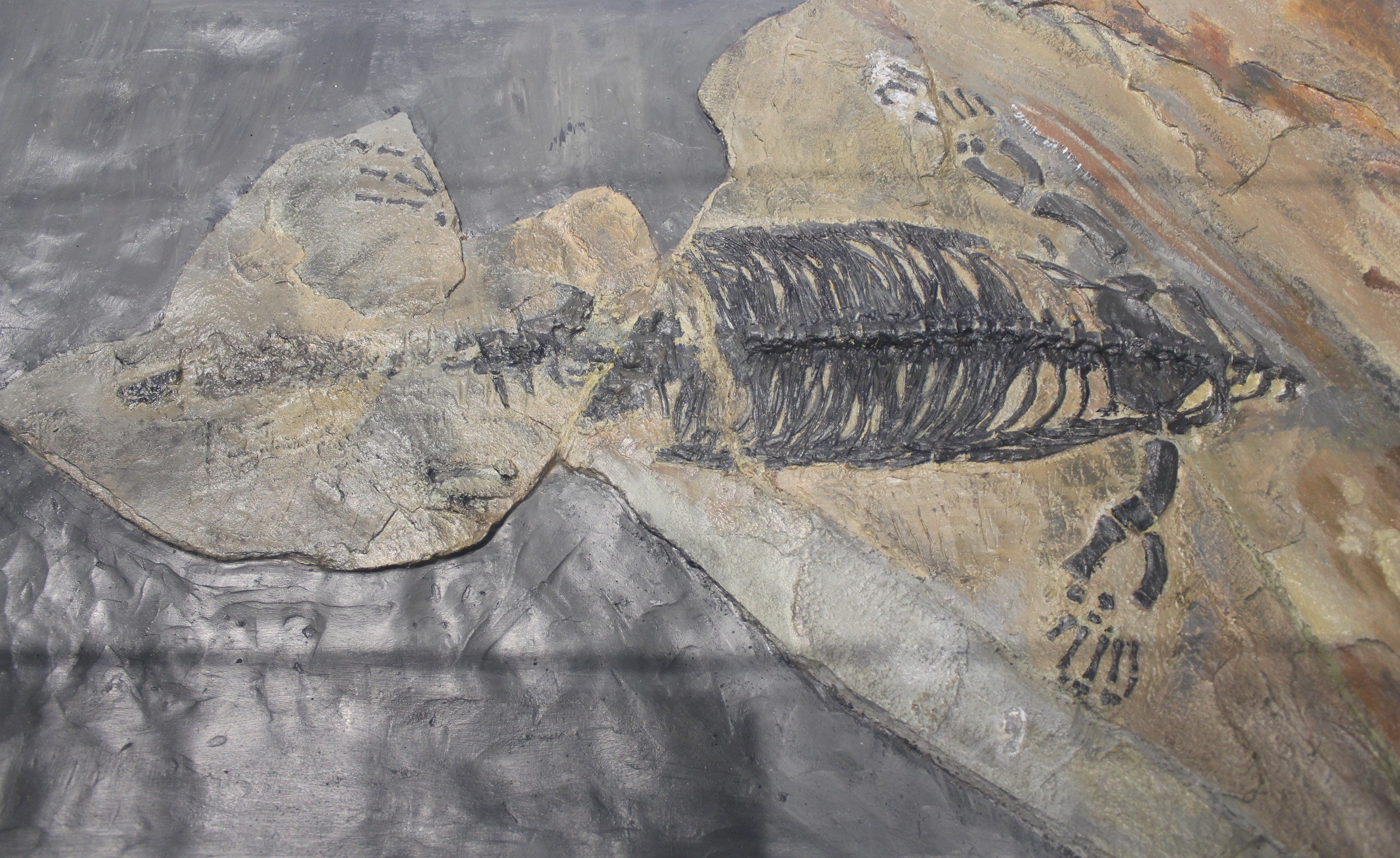
Holotype specimen (AGM-AGB5954), Geological Museum of China

Majiashanosaurus is known solely from the holotype AGM-AGB5954, a nearly complete and articulated postcranial skeleton missing, apart from the skull, some neck vertebrae and a small portion of the tail. This 47.4 cm (18.7 in) long skeleton is exposed in ventral view, i.e. from below, and preserves the last three neck vertebrae together with 19 back, three sacral, and more than 18 tail vertebrae, as well as pectoral and pelvic girdles, most of the forelimbs and hindlimbs, and ribs. AGM-AGB5954 was collected at Majiashan, Chaohu of Anhui Province, from the Upper Member of the Nanlinghu Formation, dating to the late Olenekian stage (Spathian) of the late Early Triassic, about 248 million years ago. The ichthyopterygian Chaohusaurus was found co-occurring with Majiashanosaurus in the same locality.

== Etymology ==
Majiashanosaurus was first described and named by Da-Yong Jiang, Ryosuke Motani, Andrea Tintori, Olivier Rieppel, Guan-Bao Chen, Jian-Dong Huang, Rong Zhang, Zuo-Yu Sun and Cheng Ji in 2014 and the type species is Majiashanosaurus discocoracoidis. The generic name is derived from Majiashan, in reference to the locality where the holotype was found, and from Greek sauros, meaning "lizard", a common suffix for genus names of extinct reptile. The specific name is derived from Greek δίσκος, diskos meaning "disk", plus coracoid (from corax, meaning "raven/crow"), in reference to its plate-like round coracoid that lacks a narrowing - such a trait is unique among eosauropterygians, but resembles the condition seen in placodonts.
