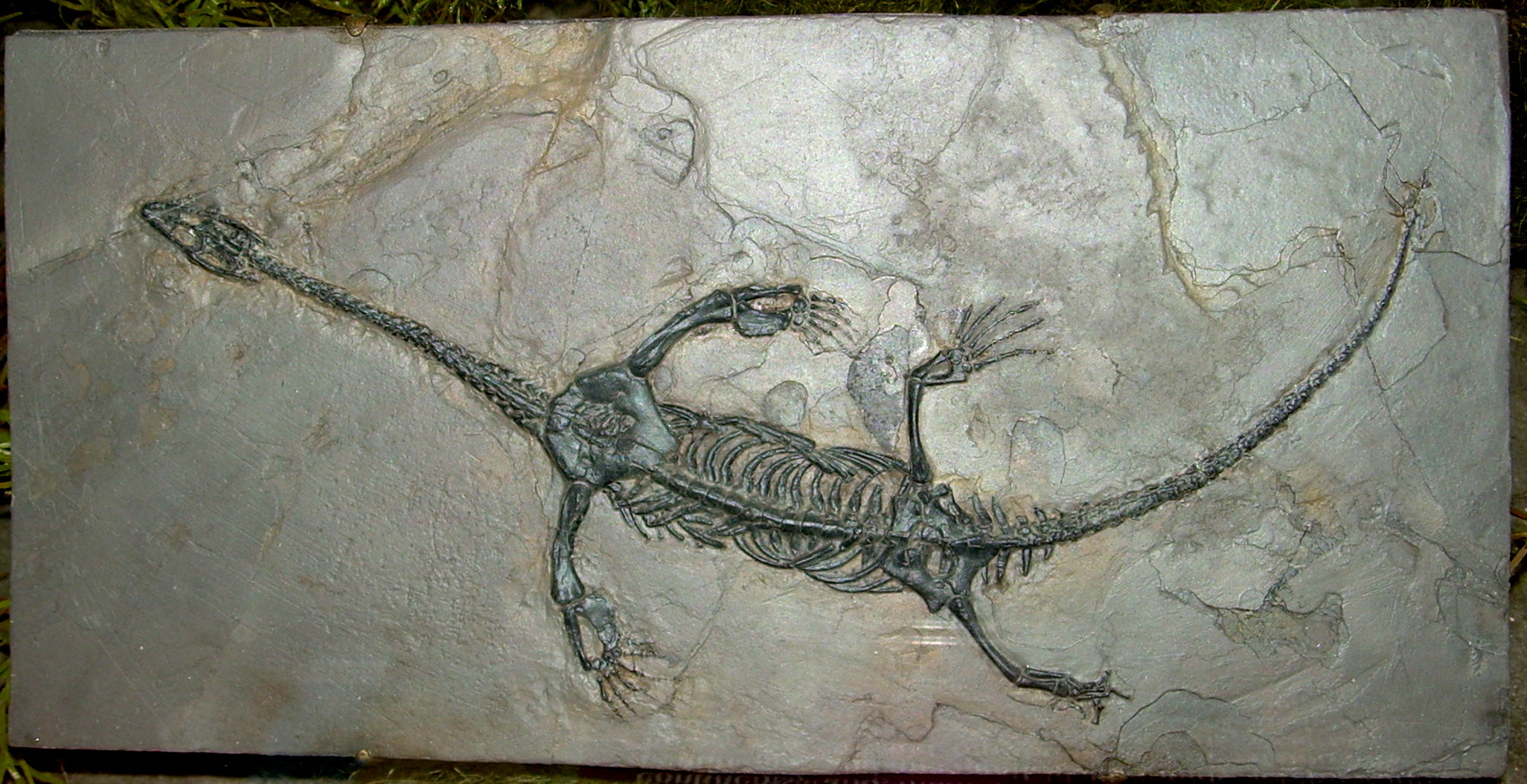
- Keichousaurus hui fossil at the North American Museum of Ancient Life

Scientific classification
- Kingdom: Animalia
- Phylum: Chordata
- Class: Reptilia
- Superorder: †Sauropterygia
- Suborder: †Pachypleurosauria
- Family: †Keichousauridae
- Genus: †Keichousaurus; Young, 1958

Species
- †K. hui Young, 1958 (type); †K. yuananensis Young, 1965

= Keichousaurus =

Keichousaurus Temporal range: Early-Late Triassic, 251–227 Ma

Extinct genus of reptiles

Keichousaurus (meaning "Kweichow lizard") is an extinct genus of pachypleurosaurian marine reptile from the Chialingchiang and Falang Formations of China with two known species attributed to the genus: K. hui and K. yuananensis.

Keichousaurus is among the most common sauropterygian fossils recovered and are often found as nearly complete, articulated skeletons, making them popular among collectors. Keichousaurus, and the pachypleurosaur family broadly, are sometimes classified within Nothosauroidea, but are otherwise listed as a separate, more primitive lineage within Sauropterygia.

== Discovery and naming ==
The holotype of K. hui, was discovered in the Falang Formation of Guizhou Province, China in 1957 by Hu Chengzhi and was named by Young (1958).

The second species, K. yuananensis, was discovered in the Jialingjiang Formation of Hebei, China and was named by Young (1965) based on the holotype specimen IVPP V.2799, a partial skeleton.

== Description ==
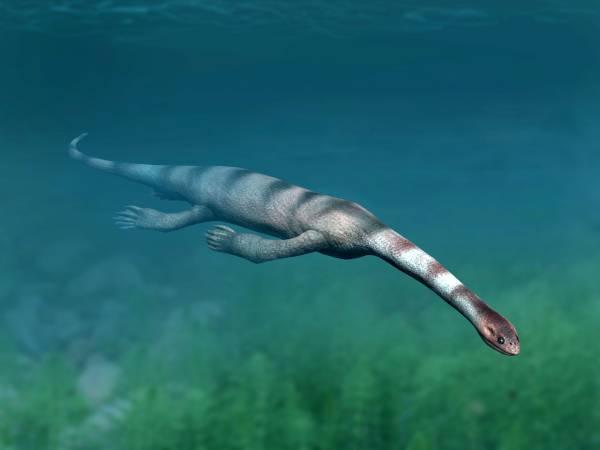
Life restoration of Keichousaurus hui

Keichousaurus, like all sauropterygians, was highly adapted to the aquatic environment. Most specimens had small body, males sexually mature with 12.6 centimetres (5.0 in) snout-vent length (SVL), and in females by 12.2 centimetres (4.8 in) SVL. Mean SVL for mature males is approximately 16.1 centimetres (6.3 in) SVL, and for mature females, at most 14.9 centimetres (5.9 in) SVL.

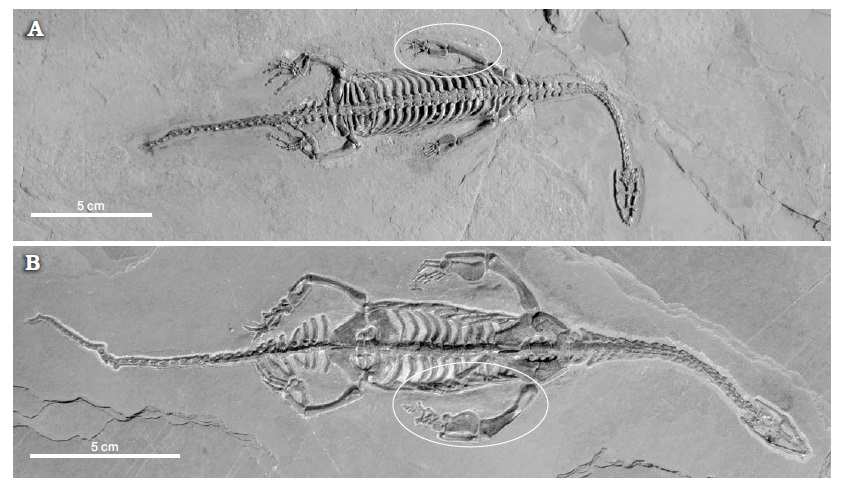
Female (top) and male (bottom) specimens, showing sexual dimorphism

This fossil is distinguished by its broad ulna which makes it unlike other European genera. The broad ulna increased the surface area of the forelimbs, making it more effective in locomotion. Keichousaurus shows many characteristics of its family Pachypleurosauridae such as its short snout and elongated temporal openings. Keichousaurus also had a long serpentine neck with a relatively small head and long tail. The anterior caudal vertebrae possess lateral transverse processes. The morphology of Keichousaurus is most like that of Dactylosaurus, showing long and narrow upper temporal openings that extends to the rear of the skull of which is not found in other pachypleurosaurids. Other differences from pachypleurosaurids include Keichousaurus' more robust humerus, very broad ulna, and slight hyperphalangy in the manus. The sternum was also lacking in this animal, and the forelimbs were more paddled-shaped, possibly indicating a greater importance of the forelimbs in movement. The pectoral girdle was formed by the paired clavicles, interclavical, scapulae, and coracoids. Keichousaurus was a primitive quadrupedal tetrapod with limbs laterally placed to the body. Different parts of Keichousaurus grew at different rates, a phenomenon called allometric growth.

== Locomotion ==
Skeletal mount of K. hui, National Natural History Museum of China

Keichousaurus possibly utilized a rowing swimming motion using its paddle-like limbs.

== Ecology ==
Based on analysis of exceptionally preserved specimens of Keichousaurus hui with preserved gut content, Keichousaurus is thought to have been a primarily piscivorous predator, catching prey with the backwardly curved teeth at the front of the mouth, and swallowing its prey whole.

== Reproduction ==
Preserved foetal specimens of Keichousaurus hui within their mothers suggests that the species was viviparous and gave birth to live young. No evidence for the presence of any eggshell has been found. The young appear to have emerged from their mothers head first.
