= Diandongosaurus =

Diandongosaurus Temporal range: Anisian, 247.2–242 Ma

Scientific classification
- Domain: Eukaryota
- Kingdom: Animalia
- Phylum: Chordata
- Class: Reptilia
- Superorder: †Sauropterygia
- Clade: †Eosauropterygia
- Genus: †Diandongosaurus; Shang et al., 2011

Type species
- †Diandongosaurus acutidentatus Shang et al., 2011

Extinct genus of reptiles

Diandongosaurus is an extinct genus of eosauropterygian known from the lower Middle Triassic (Anisian age) of Yunnan Province, southwestern China. It is known from the holotype IVPP V 17761, a complete and articulated skeleton with skull, which was found in the middle Triassic Lagerstätte of the Guanling Formation. It was first named by Qing-Hua Shang, Xiao-Chun Wu, Chun Li in 2011 and the type species is Diandongosaurus acutidentatus. A referred specimen suggests a total body length of 34 cm (13 in).
