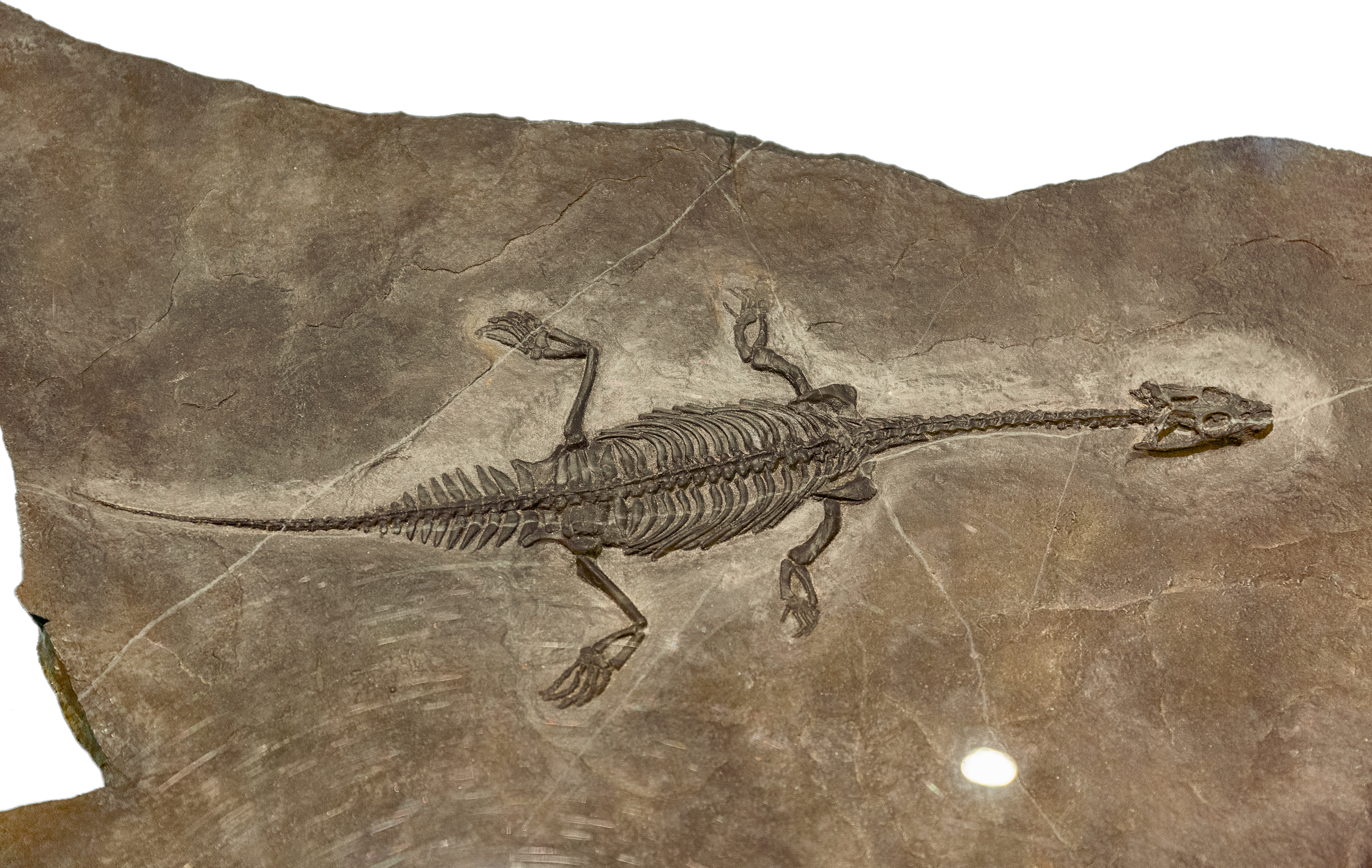
- Replica of holotype, National Taiwan Museum

Scientific classification
- Domain: Eukaryota
- Kingdom: Animalia
- Phylum: Chordata
- Class: Reptilia
- Superorder: †Sauropterygia
- Order: †Nothosauroidea
- Genus: †Dawazisaurus; Cheng et al., 2016

Type species
- †Dawazisaurus brevis Cheng et al., 2016

= Dawazisaurus =

Dawazisaurus Temporal range: Anisian, 247–242 Ma

Extinct genus of reptiles

Dawazisaurus is an extinct genus of sauropterygian of possible nothosauroid affinities from the Middle Triassic Guanling Formation in China. The type species is D. brevis.
