= Panzhousaurus =

Panzhousaurus Temporal range: Middle Triassic, Anisian

Scientific classification
- Kingdom: Animalia
- Phylum: Chordata
- Class: Reptilia
- Superorder: †Sauropterygia
- Suborder: †Pachypleurosauria
- Genus: †Panzhousaurus; Jiang et al., 2019

Type species
- †Panzhousaurus rotundirostris Jiang et al., 2019

Extinct genus of reptiles

Panzhousaurus is an extinct genus of pachypleurosaur from the Middle Triassic of China. The type species is P. rotundirostris. The preserved portion of the holotype measures 36 cm (14 in) long, and its total body length may have been less than 50 cm (20 in).

== Discovery and naming ==
In 2019, Jiang et al. described Panzhousaurus rotundirostrus as a new genus and species of pachypleurosaur based on the following 4 autapomorphies (distinctive features): a shortened and rounded snout, a neck that consists of 24 cervical vertabrae and an upper back that consists of 20 dorsal vertabrae, an ulna which was straight with a posterior margin and concave in appearance, as well as four distally located carpal (wrist) bones.
