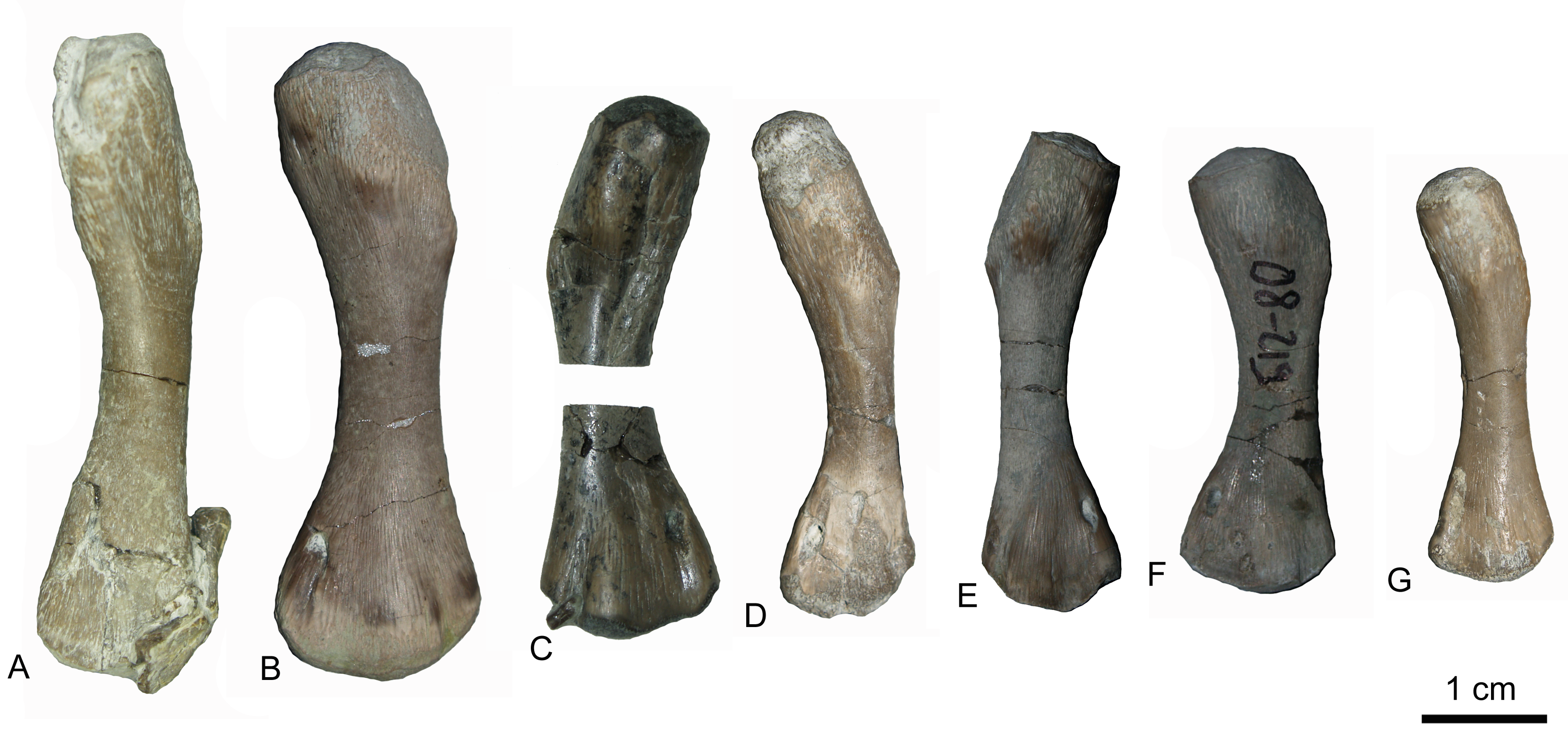
- Anarosaurus heterodontus humeri

Scientific classification
- Kingdom: Animalia
- Phylum: Chordata
- Class: Reptilia
- Superorder: †Sauropterygia
- Suborder: †Pachypleurosauria
- Family: †Pachypleurosauridae
- Genus: †Anarosaurus; Dames, 1890

Species
- †A. pumilio Dames, 1890 (type); †A. heterodontus Rieppel & Kebang, 1995

= Anarosaurus =

Anarosaurus Temporal range: Anisian, 247–242 Ma

Extinct genus of reptiles

Anarosaurus is an extinct genus of pachypleurosaurs that lived in the Middle Triassic period (Anisian) and has been found in the Jena Formation and the Karlstadt Formation of Germany and the Winterswijk Quarry (Lower Muschelkalk) of The Netherlands. Two species are known: A. pumilio (the type species) and A. heterodontus. The holotype of A. pumilio was originally housed at the Institut und Museum fur Geologie und Palaontologie, Georg-August-Universitat, Göttingen, but can no longer be located today because it was lost or destroyed during World War II. Anarosaurus was a small reptile with an estimated body length of 50–60 cm (1.6–2.0 ft).

== See also ==
- List of plesiosaurs
