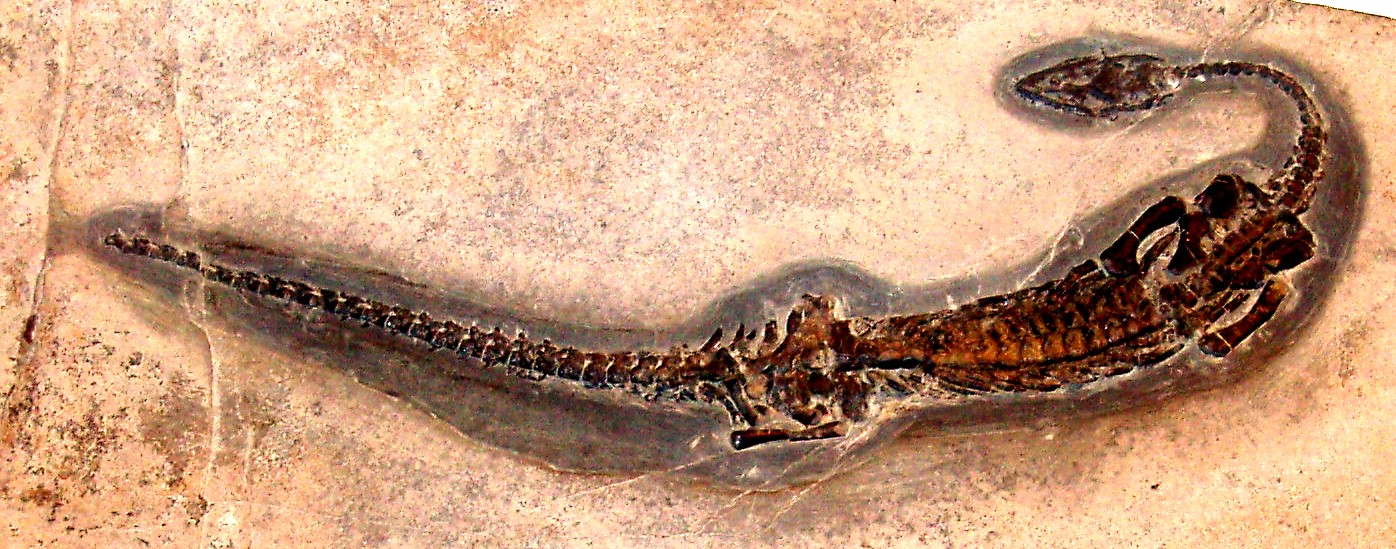
- Neusticosaurus pusillus

Scientific classification
- Domain: Eukaryota
- Kingdom: Animalia
- Phylum: Chordata
- Class: Reptilia
- Superorder: †Sauropterygia
- Family: †Pachypleurosauridae
- Genus: †Neusticosaurus; Seeley, 1882

Species
- †N. edwardsii (Cornalia, 1854 [originally Pachypleura]); †N. peyeri Sander, 1989; †N. pusillus (Fraas, 1881 [originally Simosaurus]) (type); †N. toeplitschi (Nopcsa, 1928 [originally Psilotrachelosaurus])

Synonyms
- Genus synonymy: Pachypleura Cornalia, 1854; Pachypleurosaurus Broili, 1927 (nomen dubium); Psilotrachelosaurus Nopcsa, 1928; Species synonymy: Neusticosaurus pygmaeus Fraas, 1896; Pachypleura edwardsii Cornalia, 1854; Pachypleurosaurus staubi Kuhn-Schnyder, 1959 (nomen dubium; junior synonym of N. pusillus); Psilotrachelosaurus toeplitschi Nopcsa, 1928; Simosaurus pusillus Fraas, 1881

= Neusticosaurus =

Neusticosaurus Temporal range: Middle Triassic, Ladinian

Extinct genus of reptiles

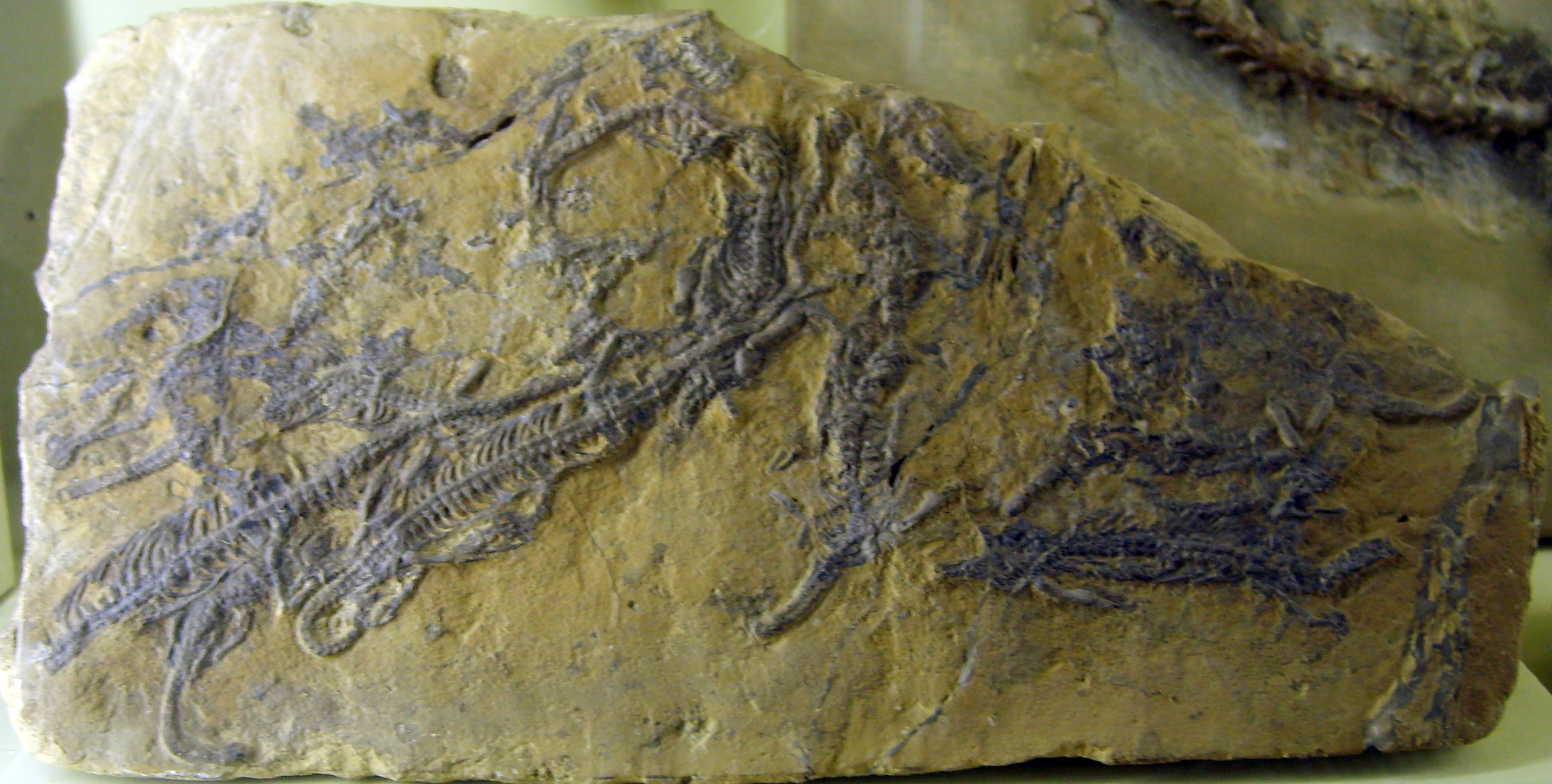
Several Neusticosaurus pusillus at the Museum für Naturkunde, Berlin

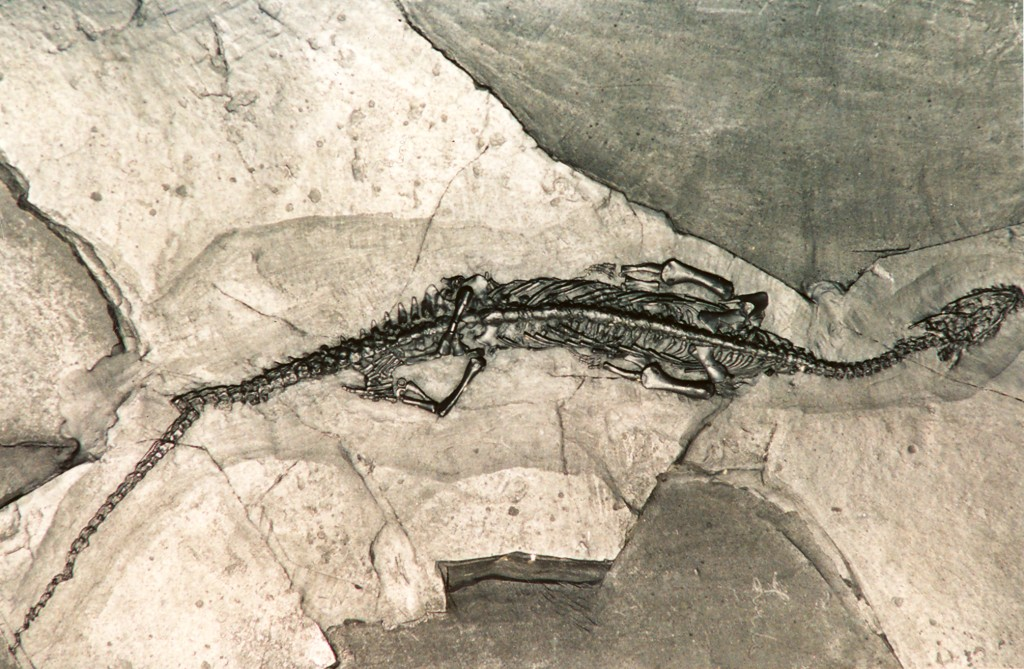
Neusticosaurus edwardsii

Neusticosaurus (sometimes misspelled Neuticosaurus) ("swimming lizard"), is an extinct genus of marine reptile belonging to the pachypleurosaurs, from Italy, Switzerland and Germany. Neusticosaurus was one of the smallest nothosaurs and probably fed on small fish. The type specimen is held at the Natural History Museum UK (NHMUK PV R53).
