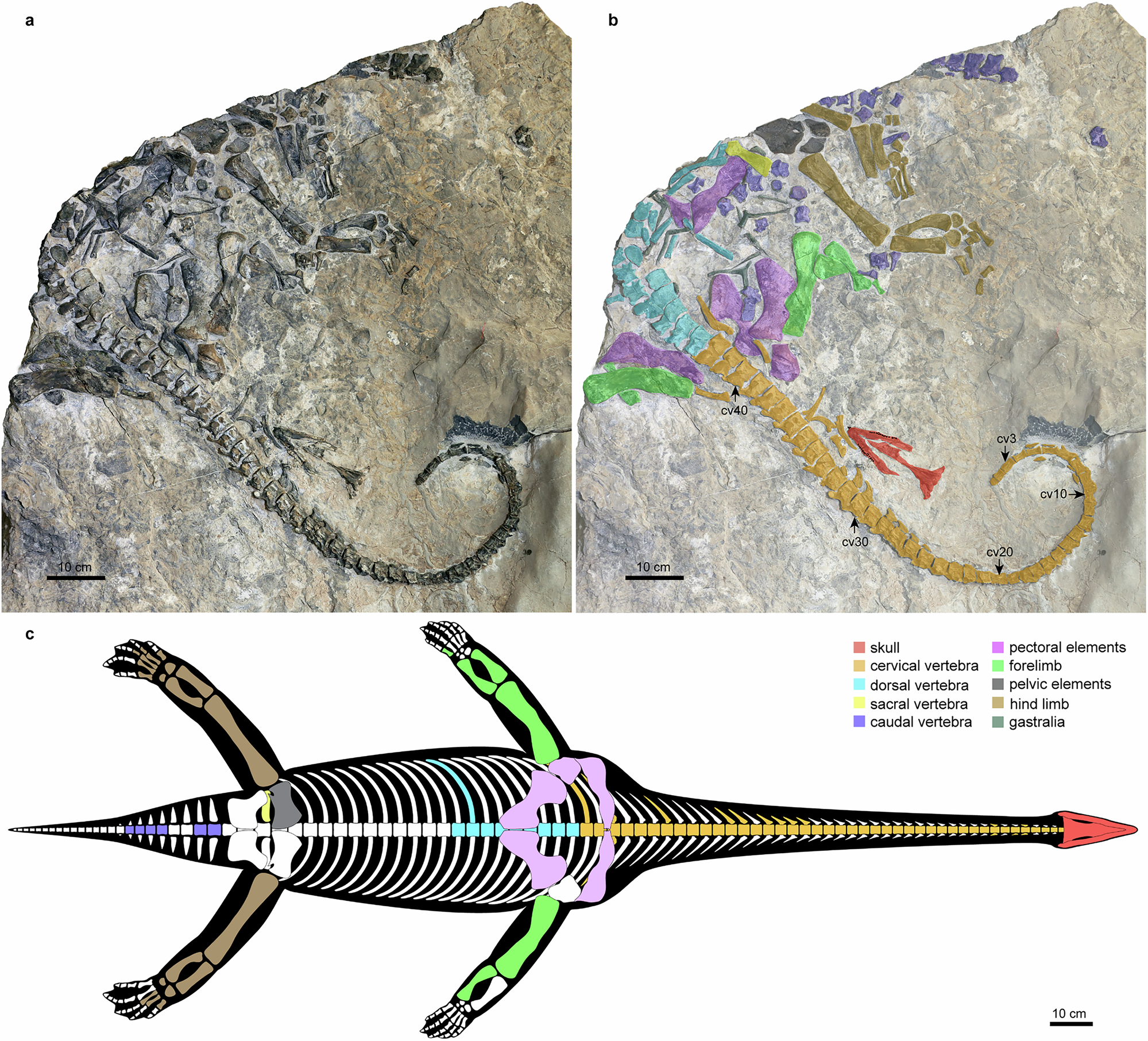
- Holotype (top) and reconstructed skeleton (bottom) L. yongshengensis

Scientific classification
- Kingdom: Animalia
- Phylum: Chordata
- Class: Reptilia
- Superorder: †Sauropterygia
- Order: †Nothosauroidea
- Suborder: †Nothosauria
- Genus: †Lijiangosaurus; Wang et al., 2025
- Species: †L. yongshengensis

Binomial name
- †Lijiangosaurus yongshengensis Wang et al., 2025

= Lijiangosaurus =

Lijiangosaurus Temporal range: Middle Triassic, Anisian

Extinct marine reptile genus

Lijiangosaurus is an extinct genus of nothosaurian sauropterygian reptiles known from the Middle Triassic (Anisian age) Beiya Formation of China. The genus contains a single species, Lijiangosaurus yongshengensis, known from a partial articulated skeleton including the skull. With 42 cervical vertebrae, Lijiangosaurus is characterized by its unusually elongated neck, longer than all other members of the marine reptile clade Sauropterygia except for pistosauroids (the group including the longer-necked plesiosaurs).

== Discovery and naming ==
In c. 2015, villagers in Banqiao village (Yongsheng County, Yunnan Province) in southwestern China discovered and collected a partial marine reptile skeleton in outcrops of the Beiya Formation (equivalent to the better-known Chinese Guanling Formation). They donated it to the local Yunnan Biantun Cultural Museum of Yongsheng (YSBB), where it is now permanently accessioned as specimen YSBB208. Part of the skeleton had already been exposed by natural weathering when it was found, so fossil preparators from the Institute of Vertebrate Paleontology and Paleoanthropology aided in further removing the additional obscuring sediment. The specimen, comprising a partially articulated skeleton, includes the skull and mandible, the complete cervical (neck) series of 42 vertebrae articulated with the first six dorsal (back) vertebrae, several dorsal ribs, a sacral rib, five partial caudal (tail vertebrae), the pectoral girdle (clavicles, coracoids, and right scapula), much of the forelimb (humerus, radius, ulna, and two metacarpals), a partial right pelvic girdle (pubis and fragmentary ilium and ischium), and much of the forelimbs (femur, tibia, fibula, tarsals, and metatarsals).

In 2025, Wei Wang and colleagues described Lijiangosaurus yongshengensis as a new genus and species of nothosaurians based on these fossil remains, establishing YSBB208 as the holotype specimen. The generic name, Lijiangosaurus, combines a reference to the discovery of the specimen in Lijiang City with the Ancient Greek σαῦρος (sauros), meaning 'lizard'. The specific name, yongshengensis, references the type locality in Yongsheng County. The L. yongshengensis holotype is the first Mesozoic reptile collected from this region.

== Description ==
Lijiangosaurus is a medium-to-large-sized nothosaurian, with an estimated total body length of more than 2.5 metres (8.2 ft). As such, it is larger than most nothosaurians except for Nothosaurus giganteus and Nothosaurus mirabilis. It has a proportionately small skull, measuring 18.2 cm (7.2 in) long, representing less than 8% of the total body length. The neck of Lijiangosaurus is unusually long, at 115 cm (45 in) long, composed of 42 vertebrae. As such, it has more cervical vertebrae than any other member of the Nothosauria. This is also more than most sauropterygians except for pistosauroids, the clade including plesiosaurs, known for their hyperelongate necks. The early-diverging pistosauroid Yunguisaurus has 50 cervical vertebrae.

Lijiangosaurus has a unique form of intervertebral articulation in comparison to related taxa; there is an accessory articulation between the infraprezygapophysis and infrapostzygapophysis, which may have limited the animal's ability to locomote via lateral undulation.

== Classification ==
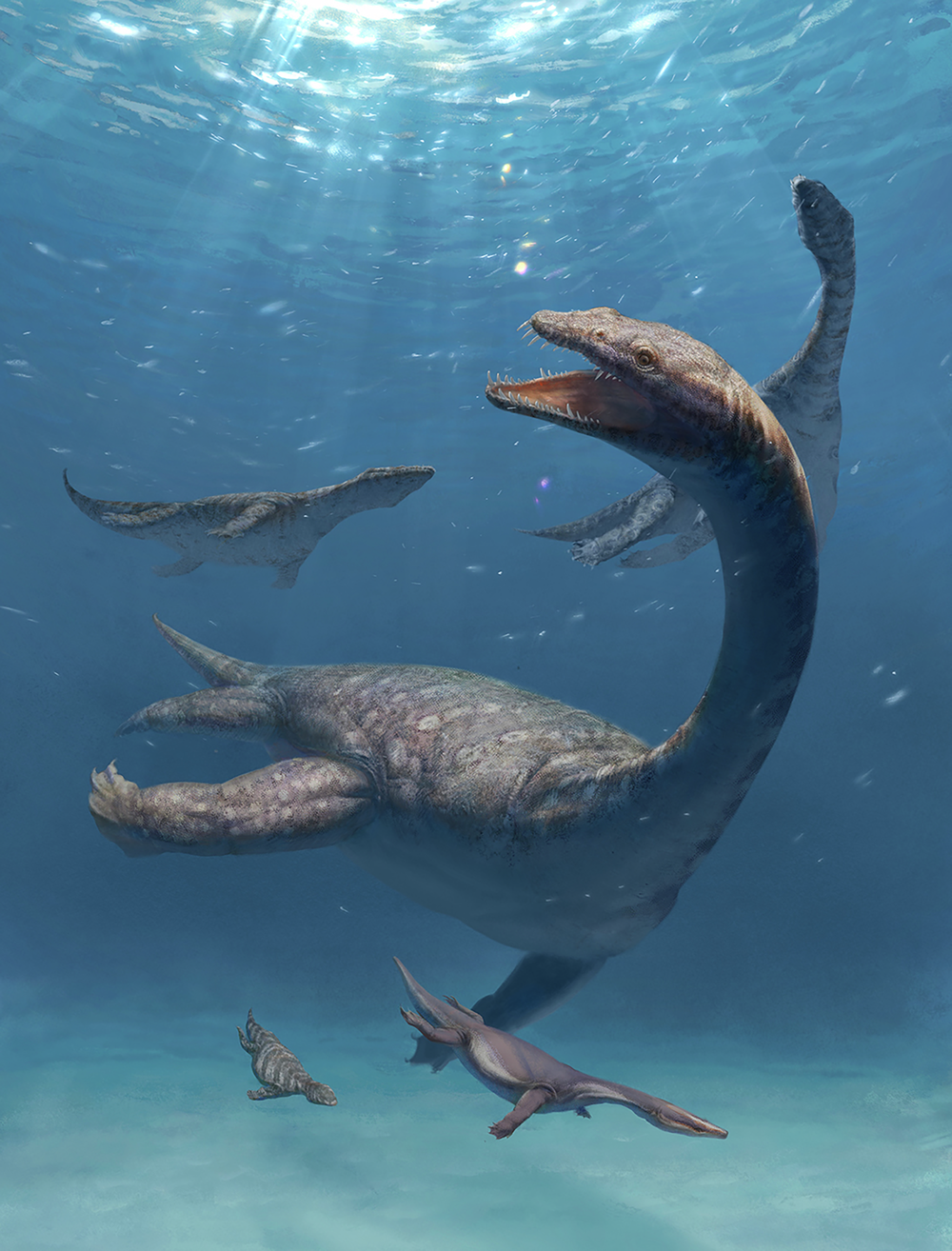
Restoration of several nothosaurians known from the Middle Triassic of China (Lijiangosaurus at center) Key • Lijiangosaurus yongshengensis (central) • Nothosaurus yangjuanensis (upper left) • Nothosaurus luopingensis (upper right) • Brevicaudosaurus jiyangshanensis (lower left) • Lariosaurus hongguoensis (lower right)

To test the relationships and affinities of Lijiangosaurus within Sauropterygia, Wang and colleagues added it to an expanded version of the phylogenetic dataset of Wang et al. (2022). In their 2025 phylogenetic analysis, as a member of the 'derived' sauropterygian clade Eusauropterygia, as the sister taxon to Wangosaurus within the Nothosauria. Nothosauria is the sister group to Pistosauroidea, the clade containing plesiosaurs, which are well known for their hyperelongated necks. These results are displayed in the cladogram below:

- Sauropterygiformes
  - Hanosaurus hupehensis
  - Pomolispondylus biani
  - - Largocephalosaurus qianensis
    - Sinosaurosphargis yunguiensis
  - Eusaurosphargis dalsassoi
  - Sauropterygia
    - Helveticosaurus zollingeri
    - - Atopodentatus unicus
      - Palatodonta bleekeri
      - Placodontia
      - Eosauropterygia
        - Wumengosaurus delicatomandibularis
        - - - Prosantosaurus scheffoldi
            - - Luopingosaurus imparilis
              - Honghesaurus longicaudalis
          - - Qianxisaurus chajiangensis
            - - - - Neusticosaurus pusillus
                  - Serpianosaurus mirigiolensis
                - - Dactylosaurus gracilis
                  - - Anarosaurus heterodontus
                    - Odoiporosaurus teruzzii
              - - - Majiashanosaurus discocoracoidis
                  - Panzhousaurus rotundirostris
                - - Dawazisaurus brevis
                  - Diandongosaurus acutidentatus
                  - Dianmeisaurus gracilis
                  - Dianopachysaurus dingi
                  - - Keichousaurus hui
                    - Eusauropterygia
                      - Simosauridae
                      - - Nothosauria
                          - Brevicaudosaurus jiyangshanensis
                          - - Germanosaurus schafferi
                            - - - Lijiangosaurus yongshengensis
                                - Wangosaurus brevirostris
                              - Nothosauridae
                                - Lariosaurus xingyiensis
                                - Nothosaurus youngi
                        - Pistosauroidea
                          - - Corosaurus alcovensis
                            - Cymatosaurus fridericianus
                          - - Yunguisaurus liae
                            - - - Augustasaurus hagdorni
                                - Pistosaurus longaevus
                              - - Plesiosauria
