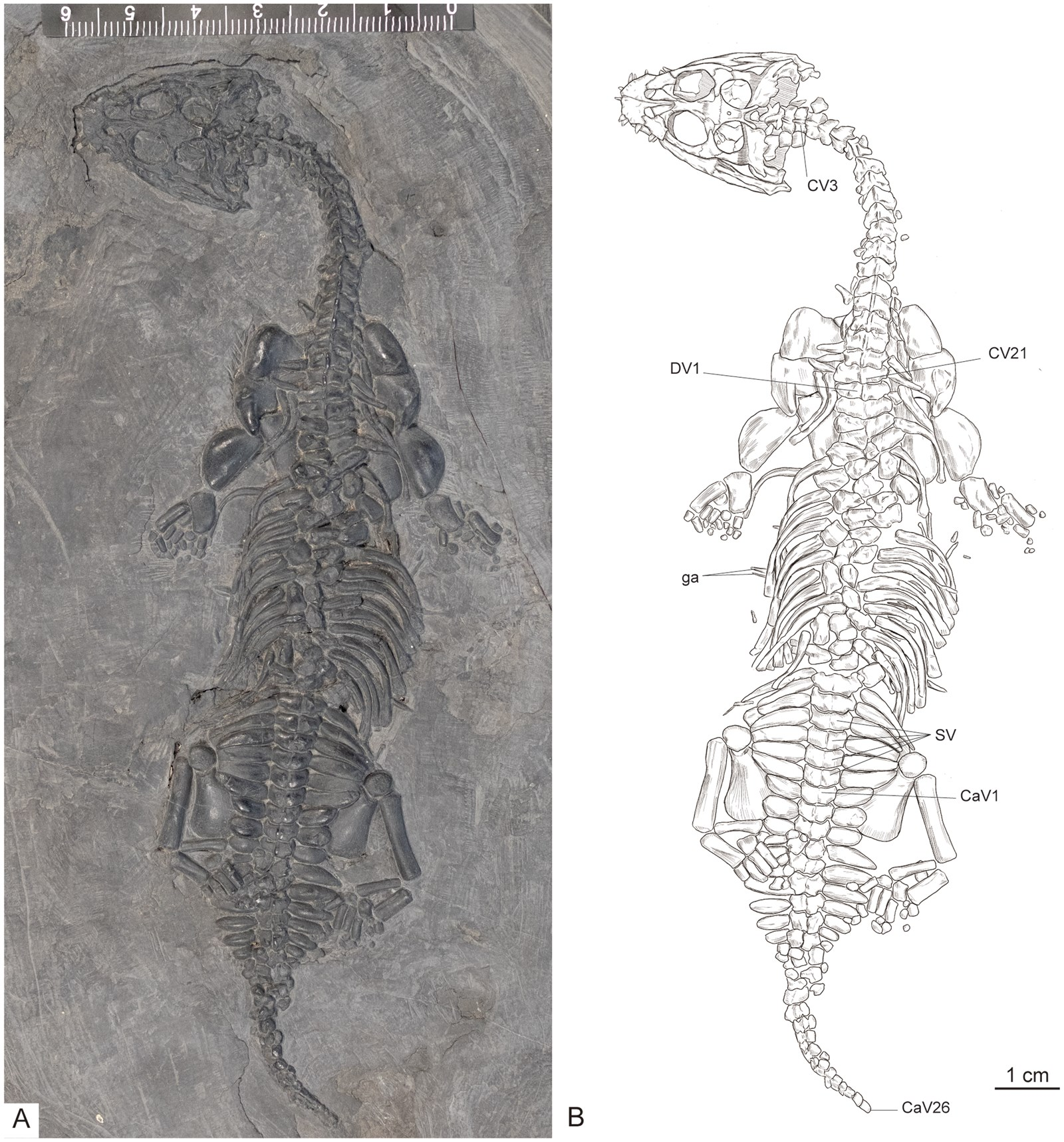
- Juvenile skeleton (WGSC SPC V 1304)

Scientific classification
- Kingdom: Animalia
- Phylum: Chordata
- Class: Reptilia
- Superorder: †Sauropterygia
- Order: †Nothosauroidea
- Genus: †Brevicaudosaurus; Shang, Wu & Li, 2020

Type species
- †Brevicaudosaurus jiyangshanensis Shang, Wu & Li, 2020

= Brevicaudosaurus =

Brevicaudosaurus Temporal range: 240 Ma

Extinct genus of aquatic reptiles

Brevicaudosaurus is an extinct genus of marine sauropterygians from the Middle Triassic of China. The genus contains a single species, Brevicaudosaurus jiyangshanensis. It was a small animal; the holotype specimen measures approximately 58.8 centimetres (23.1 in) in total length. The body is broad and flat, with an unusually short and flattened tail compared to other related taxa, which indicates that it likely could not swim quickly and may have been a benthic carnivore. A juvenile specimen, about one-third the length of adult individuals, was described in 2025. In contrast to the fanglike teeth in the mature skulls, the teeth are small and conical in the juvenile.

== Classification ==
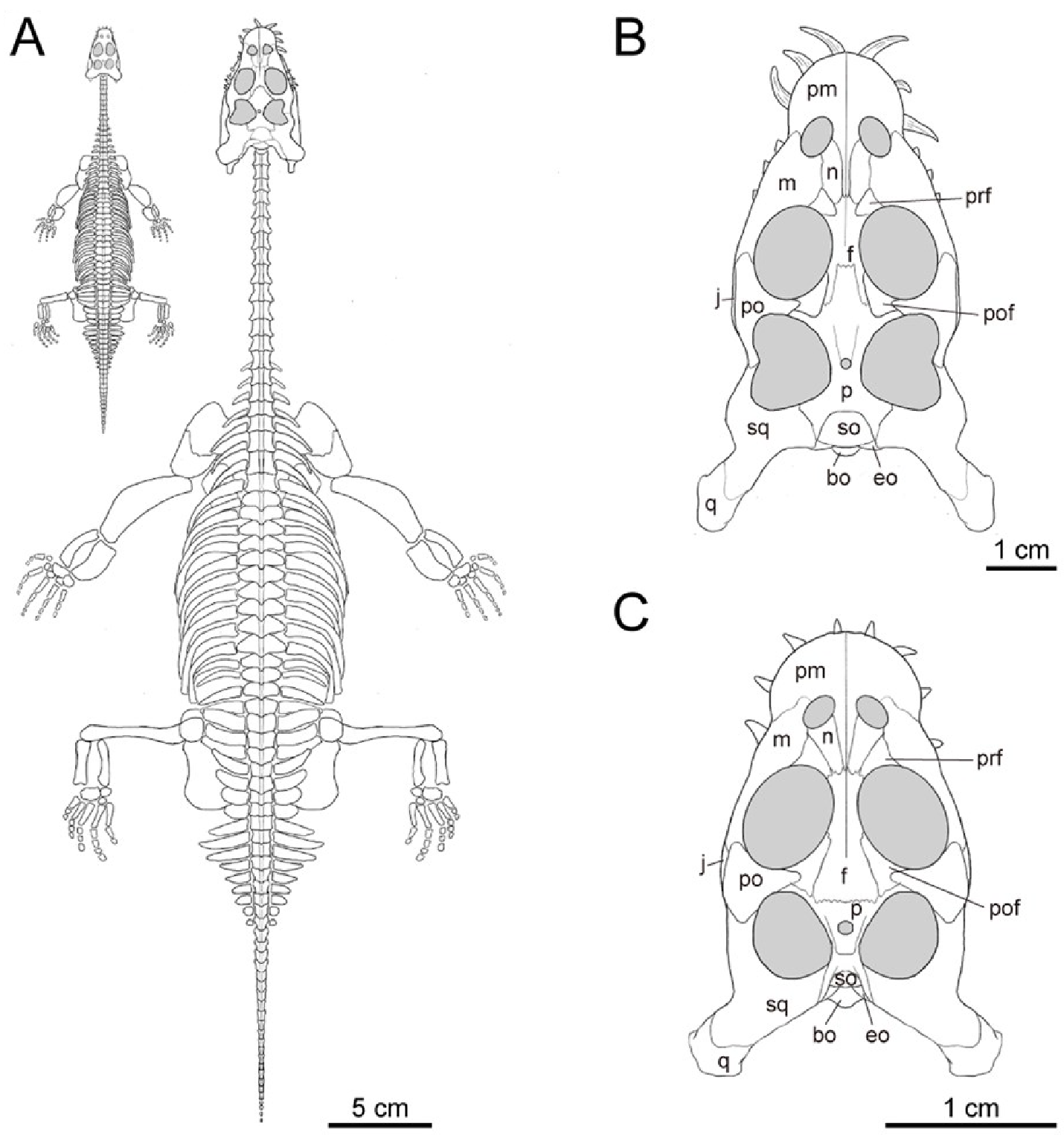
Reconstructed skeletons (left) and skulls (right) of the juvenile and adult individuals

In their 2020 phylogenetic analysis including Brevicaudosaurus, Shang, Wu & Li recovered it as the sister taxon to the Nothosauridae within the Nothosauroidea, more closely related to nothosaurids than pistosauroids. When describing the juvenile individual in 2025, Liu et al. recovered it outside of the clade including nothosaurids and pistosauroids within the Eusauropterygia. These results are displayed in the cladogram below:

- Eosauropterygia
  - Hanosaurus
  - - Majiashanosaurus
    - - Chusaurus
      - - Pachypleurosauridae
        - Eusauropterygia
          - - Dianopachysaurus
            - Dawazisaurus
            - - Diandongosaurus
              - Dianmeisaurus
          - - Panzhousaurus
            - - Keichousaurus
              - - - Paludidraco
                  - Simosaurus
                - - Brevicaudosaurus
                  - - Nothosauridae
                      - Lariosaurus
                      - Nothosaurus
                    - Pistosauroidea
                      - Wangosaurus
                      - - Germanosaurus
                        - - Corosaurus
                          - - Cymatosaurus
                            - - Yunguisaurus
                              - - Augustasaurus
                                - Pistosaurus
