= 1965 in paleontology =

List of years in paleontology	(table)
- … 1955; 1956; 1957; 1958; 1959; 1960; 1961; 1962; 1963; 1964; 1965; 1966; 1967; 1968; 1969; 1970; 1971; 1972; 1973; 1974; 1975 …
- In science 1962 1963 1964 1965 1966 1967 1968
- Art; Archaeology; Architecture; Literature; Music; Philosophy; Science; +...

Paleontology or palaeontology is the study of prehistoric life forms on Earth through the examination of plant and animal fossils. This includes the study of body fossils, tracks (ichnites), burrows, cast-off parts, fossilised feces (coprolites), palynomorphs and chemical residues. Because humans have encountered fossils for millennia, paleontology has a long history both before and after becoming formalized as a science. This article records significant discoveries and events related to paleontology that occurred or were published in the year 1965.

== Archosauromorphs ==
=== Newly named non-avian dinosaurs ===
Data courtesy of George Olshevsky's dinosaur genera list.

Name	Novelty	Status	Authors	Age	Unit	Location	Notes	Images
Tatisaurus	Gen. et sp. nov	Valid taxon	Simmons	Early Jurassic (Hettangian-Sinemurian)	Lower Lufeng Formation	China	A basal thyreophoran.	

=== Newly named birds ===
Name	Novelty	Status	Authors	Age	Unit	Location	Notes	Images
Bubo binagadensis	Sp. nov.	Valid	Burchak-Abramovich	Middle Pleistocene	Binagade	Azerbaijan	A Strigidae	
Fulica podagrica	Sp. nov.	nomen dubium	Brodkorb	Late Pleistocene		Barbados	A Rallidae, possibly a Chimera	
Neochen barbadiana	Sp. nov.	Valid	Brodkorb	Late Pleistocene		Barbados	An Anatidae.	
Phalacrocorax goletensis	Sp. nov.	Valid	Howard	Pliocene	Goleta Formation	Mexico	A Phalacrocoracidae.	
Protostrix californiensis	Sp. nov.	jr synonym	Howard	Late Eocene	Poway Formation	USA	A Protostrigidae, transferred to the genus Minerva.	

== Plesiosaurs ==
=== New taxa ===
Name	Novelty	Status	Authors	Age	Unit	Location	Notes	Images
Chinchenia	Gen et sp nov	Valid	Young	upper Middle Triassic		China	A basal pistosauroidean	
