= Kwangsisaurus =

Kwangsisaurus Temporal range: Early-Middle Triassic, 251–247 Ma

Scientific classification
- Domain: Eukaryota
- Kingdom: Animalia
- Phylum: Chordata
- Class: Reptilia
- Superorder: †Sauropterygia
- Clade: †Pistosauroidea
- Genus: †Kwangsisaurus; Young, 1965

Type species
- †Kwangsisaurus orientalis Young, 1965

Extinct genus of reptiles

Kwangsisaurus is an extinct genus of a basal pistosauroid known from the Early or Middle Triassic (Olenekian or Anisian age) of Guangxi, southern China. It contains a single species, Kwangsisaurus orientalis.

== Discovery ==
Kwangsisaurus is known solely from the holotype IVPP V2338, a fragmentary postcranial skeleton housed at the Institute of Vertebrate Paleontology and Paleoanthropology. The skeleton consists of 20 back vertebrae, six front-most tail vertebrae, badly persevered shoulder girdle, and the right forelimb. Yang misoriented the specimen, mistaking the neck for a tail and the shoulder for a pelvis. IVPP V2338 was collected at Fupingtun, Dengilu of Wuming, Guangxi Province, from the Beisi Formation of the Loulou Group. Its dating is uncertain, but falls within the Olenekian or Anisian stage of the late Early Triassic or early Middle Triassic.

A second species, K. lusiensis, named by Young in 1978 based on IVPP RV 100 and collected at Luxi, Yunnan Province from the Falang Formation, was removed from the genus and is now considered to be related to Lariosaurus.

== Etymology ==
Kwangsisaurus was first described and named by Yang Zhongjian, also known as Chung-Chien Young, in 1965 and the type species is Kwangsisaurus orientalis. The generic name is derived from Kwangsi, an alternative spelling of the former province Guangxi, where the holotype was found, and from Greek sauros, meaning "lizard", a common suffix for genus names of extinct reptile. The specific name orientalis is Latin for "of the east", as an emphasis on the east-Asian occurrence of Kwangsisaurus whose relatives were known from Europe and the Middle East at the time of its discovery.
