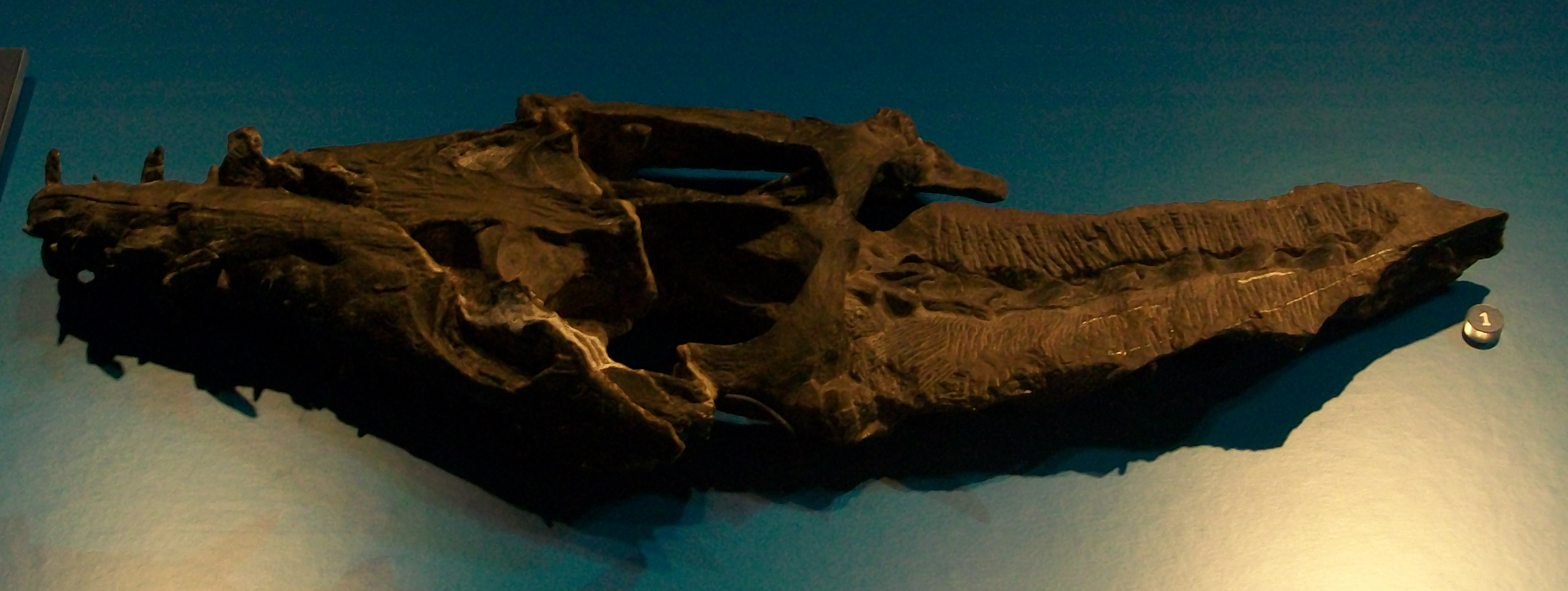
- Holotype skull (FMNH PR 1974)

Scientific classification
- Kingdom: Animalia
- Phylum: Chordata
- Class: Reptilia
- Superorder: †Sauropterygia
- Clade: †Eosauropterygia
- Clade: †Pistosauroidea
- Clade: †Pistosauria
- Genus: †Augustasaurus; Sander et al., 1997

Type species
- †Augustasaurus hagdorni Sander et al., 1997

= Augustasaurus =

Augustasaurus Temporal range: Middle Triassic, Late Anisian, 244.6–242 Ma

Extinct genus of reptiles

Augustasaurus is an extinct genus of sauropterygians that lived during the Anisian stage of the Middle Triassic in what is now North America. Only one species is known, A. hagdorni, described in 1997 from fossils discovered in the Favret Formation, Nevada, USA.

Augustasaurus is a pistosauroid estimated to be 2.5–3 m (8.2–9.8 ft) long. The skull has fang-like teeth, indicating a diet of fish and squid. Its postcranial anatomy is similar to that of future plesiosaurs, with which it visibly shares a common ancestor according to the most recent phylogenetic analyses.

The Favret Formation, from which Augustasaurus is known, contains numerous fossils of marine reptiles dating from the Middle Triassic. The fossils mainly include ichthyosaurs, Augustasaurus being the only sauropterygian to have been identified in the area.

== Discovery and naming ==
The first known fossil of Augustasaurus was discovered in 1993 in Muller Canyon, in the Augusta Mountains located in Nevada, United States. It was excavated in the Fossil Hill Member of the Favret Formation, a site dating from the Late Anisian to the Middle Triassic. The fossil consists of a partial skeleton, cataloged as FMNH PR 1974, having been partly destroyed due to weathering. After analysis, paleontologists Paul Martin Sander, Olivier Cedric Rieppel and Hugo Bucher established it as the holotype of a new genus and species under the name Augustasaurus hagdorni. The genus name is a combination of Augusta and the Ancient Greek word σαῦρος (saûros, "lizard"), all meaning "Augusta lizard", in reference to its type locality. The specific name is named in honor of the German paleontologist Hans Hagdorn, who participated with the description team in the research of numerous European marine reptiles that lived during the Triassic.

In the 1997 paper, the authors mention that the skeleton is not completely prepared and is therefore only partially described. A second study concerning the taxon was published in 2002 and this time concerned the skull, which was recovered shortly after the discovery of the partial postcranial skeleton. The skull and the postcranial skeleton are also part of the same individual.

== Description ==
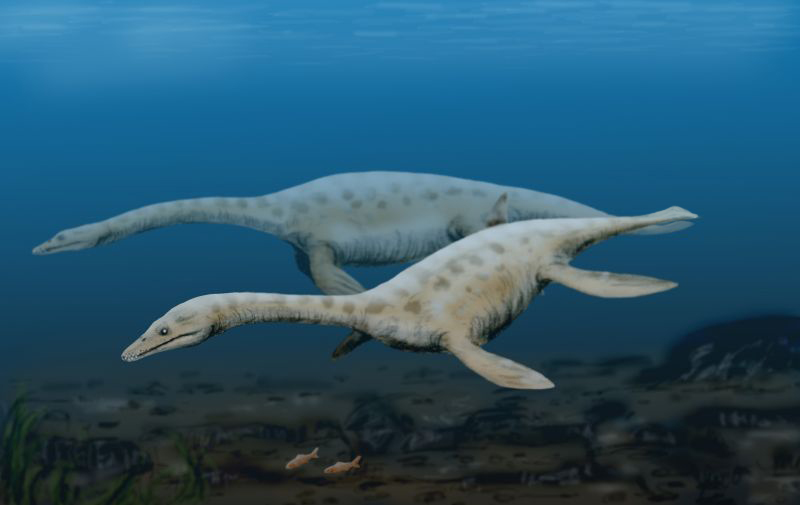
Life restoration of two A. hagdorni

Augustasaurus measured 2.5–3 m (8.2–9.8 ft) long and weighed 100 kg (220 lb). Its skull shares many general characteristics with its relative, Pistosaurus, such as tall, blade-like upper temporal arches. The skull's elongated rostrum tapers to a dull point, the anterior premaxillary and maxillary teeth have been described as "fang-like", and the squamosal makes a box-like suspensorium.

The dorsal neural spines of Augustasaurus are low with rugose tops. Its coracoids are large plates similar to those in other plesiosaurs. However, the coracoid foramina are missing from Agustasaurus, in a way similar to those in the pistosauroid Corosaurus. Its cervical ribs have anterior processes, and like most plesiosaurs, Augustasaurus' vertebrae have "thickened transverse processes".

== Classification ==
Augustasaurus belongs to the Pistosauroidea clade, a group of sauropterygians including the ancestors of the famous plesiosaurs. Early descriptions placed Augustasaurus in the proposed family Pistosauridae, classified as a sister taxon to the type genus Pistosaurus. However, the monophyly between the two genera was no longer supported by Cheng et al. (2006), where it is now classified as the sister taxon of Plesiosauria. A 2011 study led by Hilary F. Ketchum and Roger B. J. Benson gives a similar cladistic result.

Below is a cladogram of pistosauroid relationships from Ketchum & Benson, 2011:

- Pistosauroidea
  - Cymatosaurus
  - Pistosauria
    - "Pistosaurus" postcranium
    - - Bobosaurus
      - Pistosaurus
      - Yunguisaurus
      - - Augustasaurus
        - Plesiosauria

== Paleobiology ==
With its long neck, small head and fang-like teeth, Augustasaurus would have fed on fish and squid, in the same way as other pistosauroids.

== Palaeoecology ==
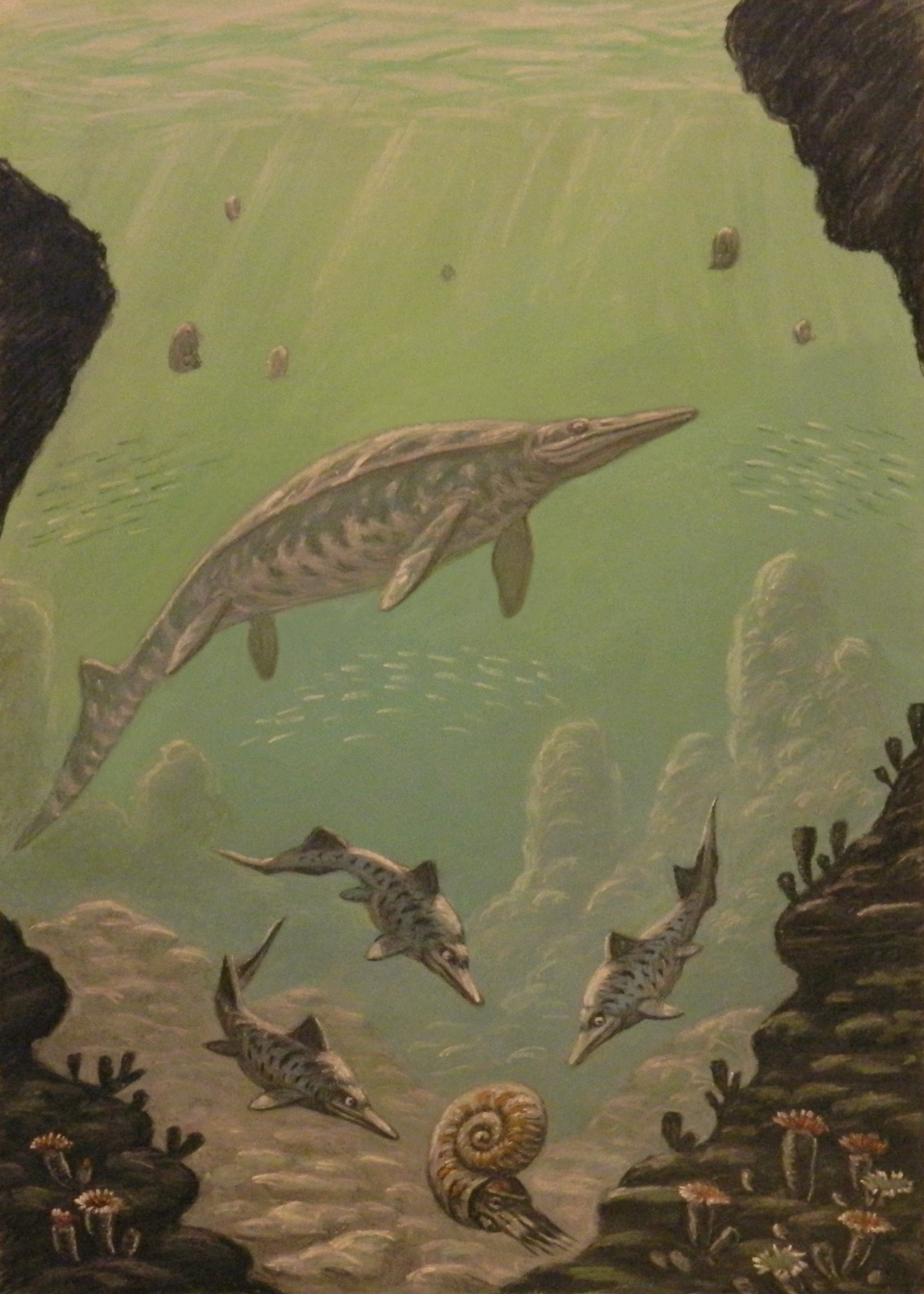
Life restoration of a Cymbospondylus swimming near a group of Phalarodon, two ichthyosaurs contemporary with Augustasaurus

Augustasaurus is known from the Favret Formation, which, along with the Prida Formation, constitutes one of the recognized geological formations of the Star Peak Group, located in Nevada. These two formations are linked by a single member, known as the Fossil Hill Member. In the Prida Formation, this member outcrops west of the Humboldt Range, and extends to the Favret Formation, outcropping in the Augusta Mountains, where it reaches up to more than 300 metres (980 ft) wide. Although they are neighbors, the two formations do not share precisely the same age, the Prida one dating from the Middle Anisian, while Favret dates from the Late Anisian, between approximately 244 and 242 million years ago.

The significant presence of marine reptiles, ammonites and other invertebrates in the Fossil Hill Member indicates that the surface waters were well aerated, but there is little animal presence in the benthic zones, with the notable exception of bivalves of the family Halobiidae. The fossils found show that the stratigraphic unit was once a pelagic ecosystem with a stable food web. Bony fish are little known and have currently only been discovered in the Favret Formation. Among the fish discovered are the actinopterygians Saurichthys and an undetermined representative, while among the sarcopterygians, numerous specimens of indeterminate coelacanthids are known. The most abundant marine reptiles of the Fossil Hill Member are the ichthyosaurs, including the apex predator Thalattoarchon, Phalarodon, Omphalosaurus and the large Cymbospondylus. Few other marine reptiles are known from the Fossil Hill Member, the only clearly identified being the sauropterygian Augustasaurus itself.

== See also ==
- Timeline of plesiosaur research
