= Chinchenia =

Chinchenia Temporal range: Anisian-Ladinian, 247–237 Ma

Scientific classification
- Domain: Eukaryota
- Kingdom: Animalia
- Phylum: Chordata
- Class: Reptilia
- Superorder: †Sauropterygia
- Clade: †Pistosauroidea
- Genus: †Chinchenia; Young, 1965

Type species
- †Chinchenia sungi Young, 1965

Extinct genus of reptiles

Chinchenia is an extinct genus of a basal pistosauroid known from the Middle Triassic (possibly Ladinian age) of Guizhou Province, southwestern China. It contains a single species, Chinchenia sungi.

== Discovery ==
Chinchenia is known from at least 4 extremely fragmentary individuals all preserved and collected together. The lectotype of Chinchenia was chosen to be IVPP V3227, the front end of the left mandible, since that at the time of its original description, its type material was not specified. Other elements from its original description are considered to be paratypes and include the front part of a left lower jaw with 5 broken teeth, 11 neck, six lower back and one sacral vertebrae in various degrees of completeness, 8 unidentified neural arch fragments, many fragments of dorsal and sacral ribs including one proximal part of a left dorsal rib, two right scapulae one of which is very incomplete, two complete humeri, 5 incomplete humeri of which four are distal ends and one is proximal, two complete thigh bones, a proximal and a distal tibiae, and a fibula fragment. Other fragments of potentially coracoids, ilia, ischia, etc., were originally mentioned. A yet another fragmentary skeleton, IVPP V 4004, was mentioned by Young & Dong (1972). All specimens are housed at the Institute of Vertebrate Paleontology and Paleoanthropology. The material was collected near the Cangxi Bridge at Shangpu, Tsanchichiao, 7 km west of Qingzhen of Guizhou Province. Although originally said to come from the first member of the Anisian Guangling Formation, a Ladinian age was considered more likely by subsequent authors for the material.

== Etymology ==
Chinchenia was first described and named by Yang Zhongjian, also known as Chung-Chien Young, in 1965 and the type species is Chinchenia sungi. The generic name is derived from Chinchen, an alternative spelling of the city of Qingzhen where the holotype was found.
