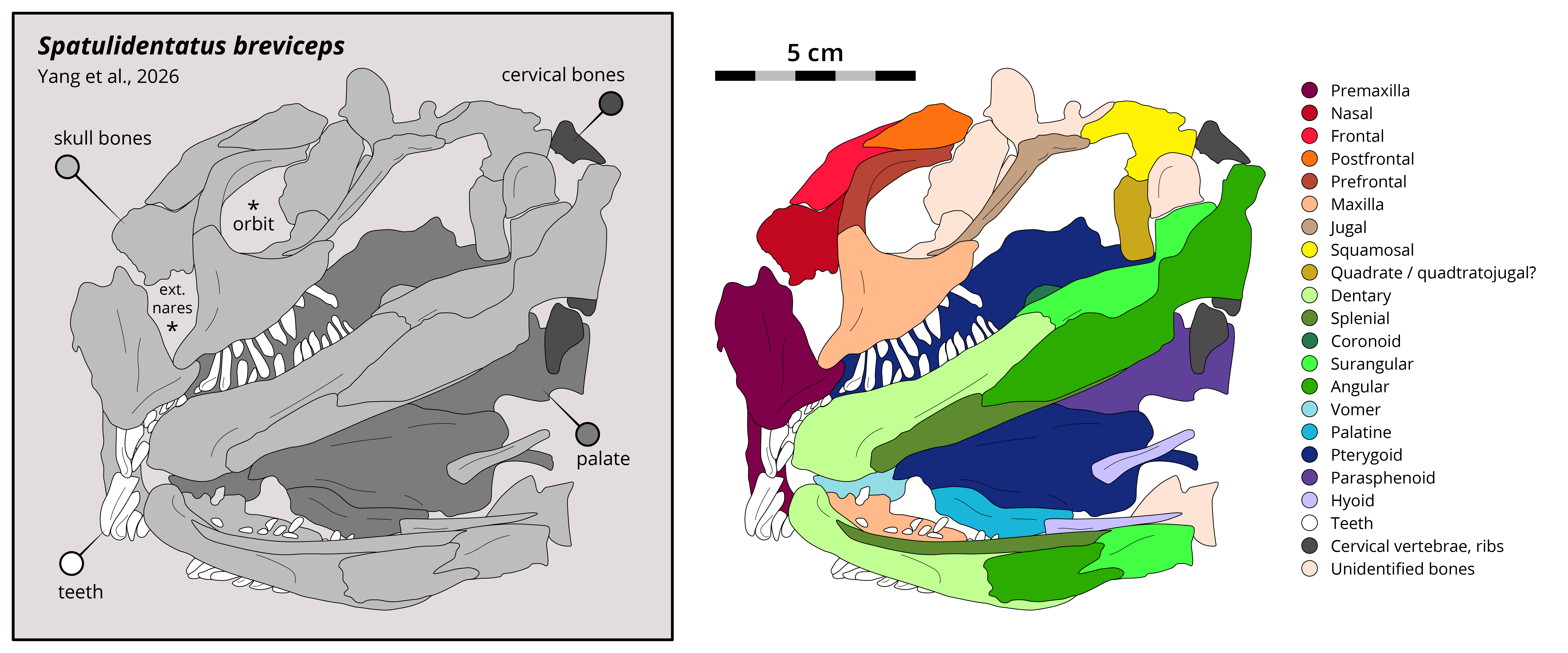
- Diagrams of the holotype skull

Scientific classification
- Kingdom: Animalia
- Phylum: Chordata
- Class: Reptilia
- Clade: Neodiapsida
- Clade: †Sauropterygiformes
- Superorder: †Sauropterygia
- Genus: †Spatulidentatus; Yang et al., 2026
- Species: †S. breviceps

Binomial name
- †Spatulidentatus breviceps Yang et al., 2026

= Spatulidentatus =

Spatulidentatus Temporal range: Middle Triassic, Anisian

Extinct genus of marine reptile

Spatulidentatus (lit. 'spoon-shaped teeth') is an extinct genus of basal sauropterygian, part of a group of marine reptiles, known from the Middle Triassic (Anisian age) Guanling Formation of China. The genus contains a single species, Spatulidentatus breviceps, known from a single articulated skeleton including the skull. With a body length of 2.7 m (8.9 ft), Spatulidentatus is a medium-sized sauropterygian. It is characterized by a short snout, a proportionally small skull, jaws bearing spatulate teeth, tall neural spines on the back and tail vertebrae, and an expanded end of the humerus.

== Discovery and naming ==
The Spatulidentatus fossil material was discovered in outcrops of the Guanling Formation (upper member) near the border between Yunnan and Guizhou provinces in Southwestern China. The specimen is housed in the Geological Museum of Guizhou (GMG), where it is permanently accessioned as specimen GMG10. It consists of a nearly complete, largely articulated skeleton including the skull, but missing some of the manual and pedal (hand and foot) phalanges and metatarsals. The specimen is exposed on a slab in lateral and ventrolateral views.

In 2026, Mei Yang and colleagues described Spatulidentatus breviceps as a new genus and species of early sauropterygian based on these fossil remains, designating GMG10 as the holotype specimen. The generic name, Spatulidentatus, combines the Latin words spatula, which refers to a broad, flat tool or spoon-like shape, and dentatus, meaning 'toothed'. The specific name, breviceps, combines the Latin roots brevi-, meaning 'short', and -ceps, meaning 'headed', in reference to the proportionally small head of this species.

== Description ==
Size compared to a human

The S. breviceps holotype is a medium-sized marine reptile, with a length of 2.69 metres (8.8 ft). The head is proportionately quite small, with a length of 13.3 cm (5.2 in), comprising about 5% of the total body length. The front of the snout has undergone some taphonomic distortion, but it was likely relatively short in life. The cranium is taphonomically compressed in such a way that the left lateral surface of the skull and mandible is primarily visible, in addition to the inside of the right lower jaw and part of the palate. The external nares (outer 'nose holes' of the skull) are circular, and the orbits are oval. The hyoids are slender.

The premaxilla (upper tooth-bearing bone at the front of the snout) bears five teeth, while the maxilla (primary upper tooth-bearing bone) has at least twelve. The right dentary (lower tooth-bearing bone) has seven teeth preserved, in addition to three empty alveoli (tooth positions). All of these marginal teeth have a unique spatulate (or 'spoon-like') morphology, where the tooth neck is constricted, while the crown is expanded. The crowns are flattened, curving lingually (toward the tongue). The teeth exhibit subthecodont implantation.

The neck is longer than the skull, comprising at least 12 vertebrae. The preservation style of the fossil obscures most of the dorsal (trunk) vertebrae, with only five being visible. At least 25 were present based on the rib count. The ribs are well-developed. The tail is long, with at least 58 vertebrae, comprising around 42% of the animal's total length. The neural spines of the dorsal and caudal vertebrae are notably elongated. Most of the components of the pectoral and pelvic girdles are preserved, being exposed in ventral (bottom) view. The scapula is robustly built, with a very prominent dorsal (toward the top) expansion. The coracoid has a sub-oval shape. The forelimbs are longer and more robust than the hindlimbs. The humerus has a distinct distal expansion (at the end facing away from the body) with a well-developed condyle.

=== Relationships ===
Yang and colleagues (2026) did not perform a phylogenetic analysis to test the relationships of Spatulidentatus, but they noted some anatomical features that support its placement as a basal (early-diverging) member of the Sauropterygia. The short snout, triangular maxilla, and robust mandible of Spatulidentatus are similar to some basal European sauropterygians from the Middle Triassic, including Paraplacodus (a placodont) and Eusaurosphargis. The transverse processes on the dorsal vertebrae are elongated, as in placodonts, saurosphargids, and Atopodentatus, though the taxonomic position and relationships of these taxa are unclear.

== Paleoecology ==
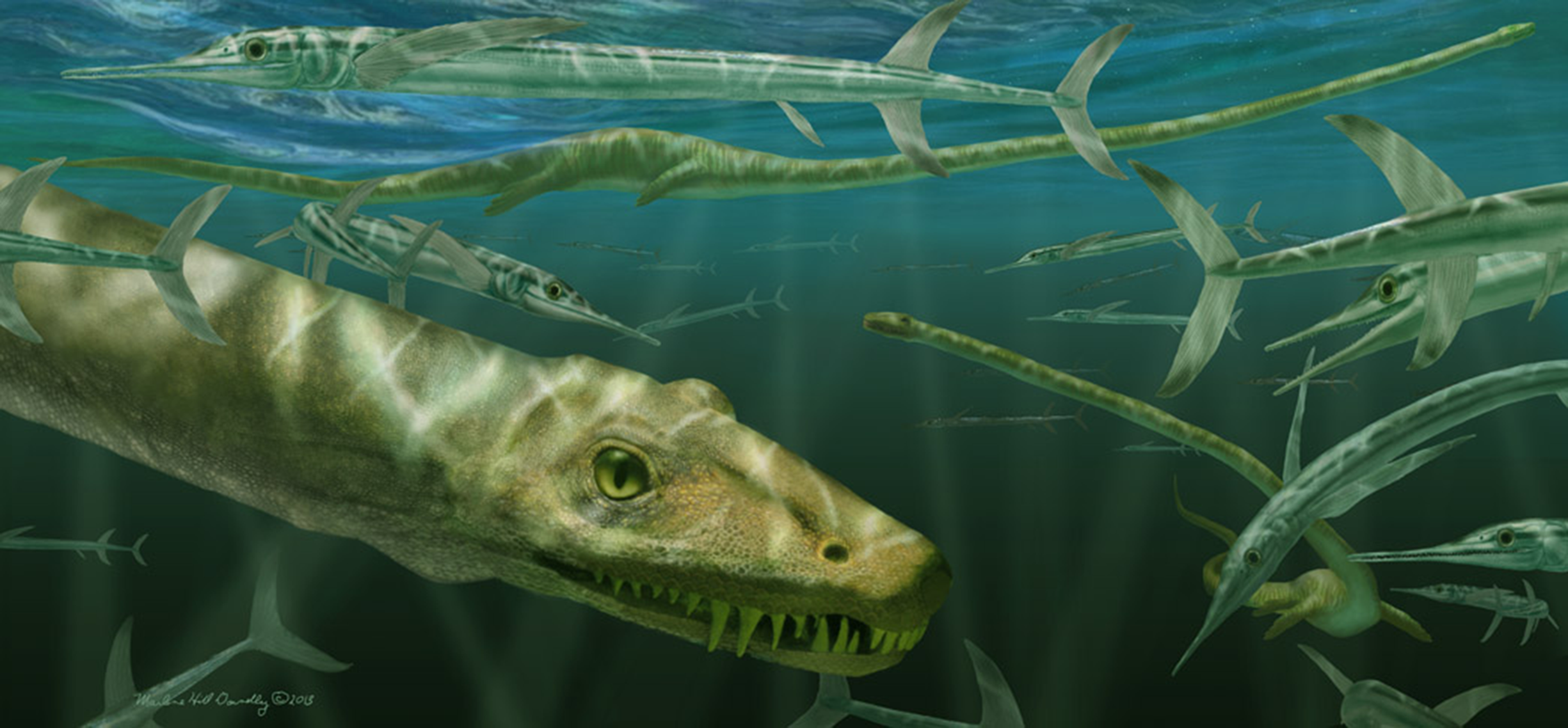
Paleoenvironmental reconstruction of the Guanling sea, including Dinocephalosaurus (a marine reptile) and Saurichthys (a predatory fish)

Spatulidenatus is known from the Guanling Formation, which dates to the Anisian age of the middle Triassic period. This formation was deposited in a near-coastal marine environment in the Tethys Ocean. A diverse faunal assemblage represented by well-preserved fossils has been recovered from this formation, including various marine invertebrates (especially crustaceans and molluscs), abundant fishes (including members of more than nine actinopterygian families and some rarer coelacanths), and many marine reptiles. Despite their relative rarity in comparison to invertebrates and fishes, the marine reptiles remain an important and diverse component of this ecosystem, some of them being the apex predators. Marine reptiles from this formation include ichthyosaurs, a pseudosuchian, several tanysaurs, and an especially diverse assemblage of sauropterygians (and allied taxa). These comprise members of the Nothosauria, Pachypleurosauria, Placodontia, and Saurosphargidae, in addition to the aberrant Atopodentatus, which may not belong to any of these clades.
