= Bobosaurus =

Bobosaurus Temporal range: Late Triassic, 228–223 Ma
- Scale diagram of Bobosaurus compared to a human

Scientific classification
- Kingdom: Animalia
- Phylum: Chordata
- Class: Reptilia
- Superorder: †Sauropterygia
- Clade: †Pistosauria
- Genus: †Bobosaurus; Dalla Vecchia, 2006
- Species: †B. forojuliensis

Binomial name
- †Bobosaurus forojuliensis Dalla Vecchia, 2006

Extinct genus of reptiles

Bobosaurus is an extinct genus of sauropterygian reptile related to plesiosaurs. It is based on the holotype MFSN 27285, a partial skeleton found in early Carnian-aged rocks (early Late Triassic) of the Rio del Lago Formation, northeastern Italy. Bobosaurus was named in 2006 by Fabio M. Dalla Vecchia and the type species is B. forojuliensis. It may be a pistosaurid, or closer to Plesiosauria. A recent cladistic analysis found it to be a more basal pistosaur. It was a relatively large animal, with more than 3 m (9.8 ft) in length.

== See also ==
- Timeline of plesiosaur research
- List of plesiosaur genera
