= Phalacrocorax goletensis =

Phalacrocorax goletensis Temporal range: Pliocene

Scientific classification
- Domain: Eukaryota
- Kingdom: Animalia
- Phylum: Chordata
- Class: Aves
- Order: Suliformes
- Family: Phalacrocoracidae
- Genus: Phalacrocorax
- Species: †P. goletensis

Binomial name
- †Phalacrocorax goletensis Howard, 1965

Extinct species of bird

Phalacrocorax goletensis is an extinct species of Phalacrocorax that lived during the Pliocene epoch.

== Distribution ==
Phalacrocorax goletensis fossils hail from the Goleta Formation of Mexico.
