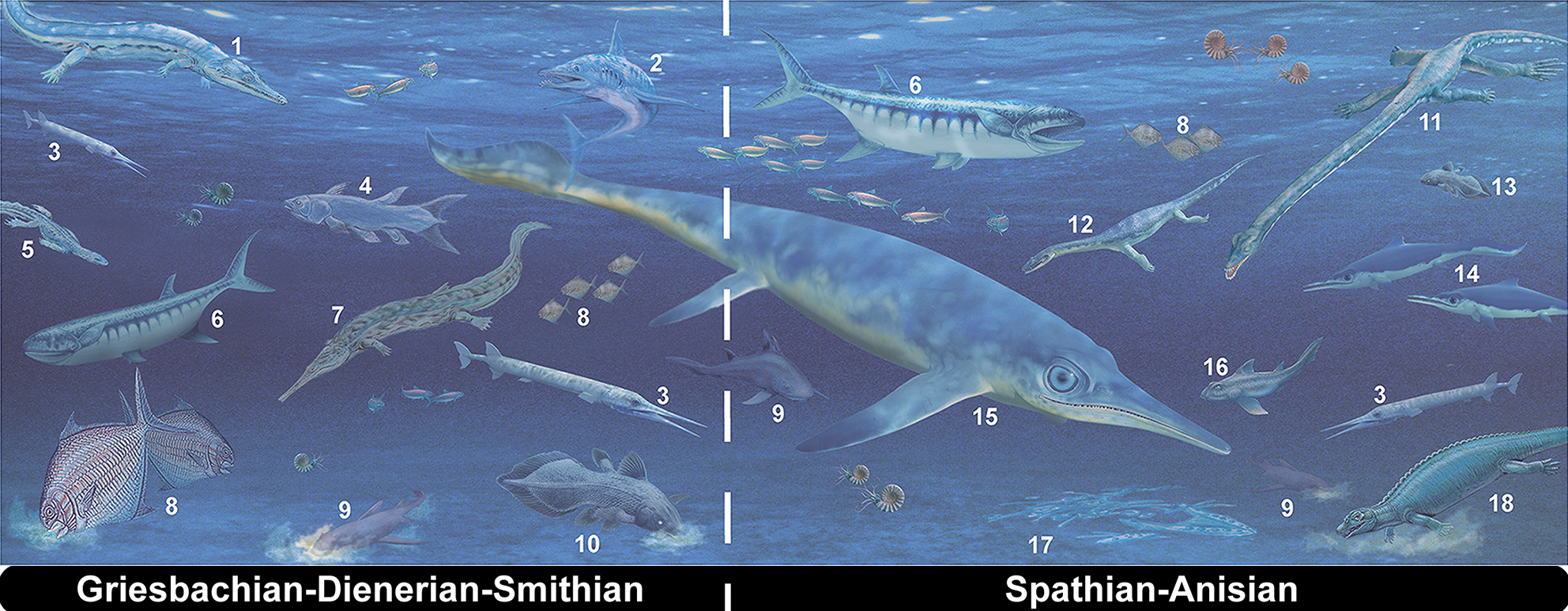
- Corosaurus (12) and other Early Triassic marine predators

Scientific classification
- Kingdom: Animalia
- Phylum: Chordata
- Class: Reptilia
- Superorder: †Sauropterygia
- Clade: †Pistosauroidea
- Family: †Corosauridae; Kuhn, 1961
- Genus: †Corosaurus; Case, 1936
- Species: †C. alcovensis

Binomial name
- †Corosaurus alcovensis Case, 1936

= Corosaurus =

Corosaurus Temporal range: Early Triassic, 247.4–245 Ma

Extinct genus of reptiles

Corosaurus is an extinct genus of pistosauroid known from Wyoming of the United States. The holotype measured about 1.65 m (5.4 ft) long, while larger specimens would have belonged to individuals measuring more than 4 m (13 ft) long.

== History of discovery ==
Corosaurus is known from the holotype UW 5485, a partial skeleton which includes the skull. Later, the referred specimens YPM 41030-41068, FMNH PR 135, FMNH PR 1368-1369, FMNH PR 242-246 and FMNH PR 1382-1383 were described by Glenn William Storrs in 1991. All specimens were collected in Jackson Canyon, Natrona County, from the Chugwater Group of the Alcova Limestone Formation, dating to the late Olenekian stage of the late Early Triassic, about 247.4-245 million years ago.

=== Etymology ===
Corosaurus was first named by Ermine Cowles Case in 1936 and the type species is Corosaurus alcovensis. The specific name is derived from the name of the Alcova Limestone Formation, in which the holotype was found.

== Classification ==
Corosaurus was placed in its own family, Corosauridae, which named by Oskar Kuhn, in 1961. After a revision of the holotype and referred material of Corosaurus, Olivier Rieppel found Corosaurus to be the sister-taxon to a clade comprising Cymatosaurus, Pistosaurus and Plesiosauria.
