= Wangosaurus =

Wangosaurus Temporal range: Middle Triassic, 237 Ma

Scientific classification
- Kingdom: Animalia
- Phylum: Chordata
- Class: Reptilia
- Superorder: †Sauropterygia
- Clade: †Eosauropterygia
- Genus: †Wangosaurus; Ma et al., 2015

Type species
- †Wangosaurus brevirostris Ma et al., 2015

Extinct genus of reptiles

Wangosaurus is an extinct genus of basal eosauropterygian, either a pisotosauroid or a nothosaur, known from the Middle Triassic (late Ladinian stage) Falang Formation of Xingyi in Guizhou Province, southwestern China. It contains a single species, Wangosaurus brevirostris, first described and named by Le-Tian Ma, Da-Yong Jiang, Olivier Rieppel, Ryosuke Motani and Andrea Tintori in 2015. The specific name brevirostris comes from Greek for "short snout". It is known solely from its holotype, a nearly complete and articulated skeleton measuring 2.2 m (7.2 ft) long (without only the rear part of its tail).
