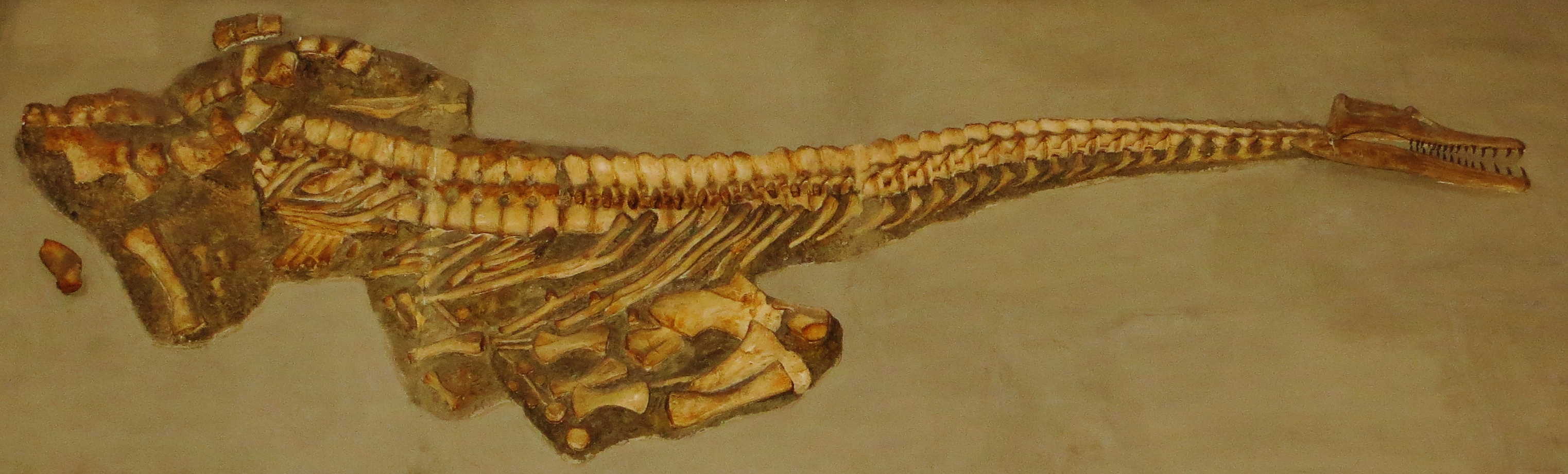
- Fossil

Scientific classification
- Kingdom: Animalia
- Phylum: Chordata
- Class: Reptilia
- Superorder: †Sauropterygia
- Family: †Pistosauridae; Zittel, 1887
- Genus: †Pistosaurus; Meyer, 1839

Type species
- †Pistosaurus longaevus Meyer, 1839

= Pistosaurus =

Pistosaurus Temporal range: Middle Triassic, Anisian–Ladinian

Extinct genus of reptiles

Pistosaurus (exact etymology uncertain) is an extinct genus of aquatic sauropterygian reptile closely related to plesiosaurs. Fossils have been found in France and Germany, and date to the Middle Triassic. It contains a single species, Pistosaurus longaevus, which is known as the oldest "subaquatic flying" reptile on earth.

The skull of Pistosaurus generally resembles that of other Triassic sauropterygians. However, there are several synapomorphies that distinguish it from them: the long, slender snout; the possession of splint-like nasals that are excluded from the external naris; and the posterior extension of the premaxilla to the frontals. Based on synapomorphies such as the small nasals' size and the presence of interpterygoid vacuity, Pistosaurus is more closely related to the Plesiosauria than to Nothosaurus.

Pistosaurus is often mistaken with Nothosaurus and plesiosaurs. The former genus belongs to the clade Nothosauroidea also from the Triassic (approximately 251–199 million years ago), while the latter belongs to stem group Plesiosauria. Both Pistosaurus and Plesiosauria belong to the clade Pistosauroidea, which originates from the Triassic.

== Description and paleobiology ==
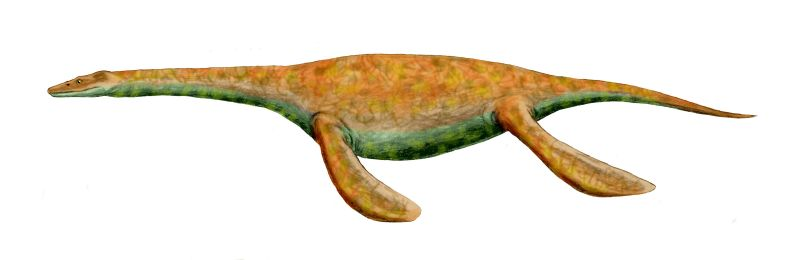
Restoration of Pistosaurus longaevus

Pistosaurus was about 3 metres (10 ft) long, and had a body form resembling that of nothosaurs, aquatic reptiles that flourished during the Triassic. However, the vertebral column was stiff, like that of a plesiosaur, implying that the animal used its paddle-like flippers to propel itself through the water, as the plesiosaurs probably did. The head also resembled that of a plesiosaur, but with the primitive palate of a nothosaur, and numerous, sharp teeth ideal for catching and eating fish.

=== Post-cranial skeleton ===
The description below is based on the specimen examined by paleontologist Sues in 1987.

==== Pectoral girdle and forelimbs ====
The structure of pectoral girdle and humerus are used to support the anterior part of the body. The scapula in pectoral girdle of Pistosaurus consists with a massive body and a short posterodorsal process. It is smaller in size compared to coracoid. And its lateral margin of the body is gently convex anteroposteriorly while the medial margin is more strongly convex.

The coracoid bone of Pistosaurus is flat and expanded medially. The glenoid region is similar to Nothosaurus in development: both the slight notching of its margin and a distinct facet contact with the humeral head. There is also a ridge like thickening which links the glenoid to posteromedial region of the coracoid. This feature is a synapomorphy that appears in plesiosaurs, which is a thickened ridge passes transversely across the anterior portion of the coracoid to connect the glenoid region. This feature is suggested related to compressional force by limb motion in Pistosaurus.

A specimen of the left humerus of Pistosaurus analyzed by Paleontologist A.R.I. Cruickshank is one of the largest specimens recorded: 245mm long and 45mm wide at the mid-shaft. The specimen showing that the axis of Pistosaurus' humerus is straight, with the distal end slightly expanded posteriorly. From proximal view, the head of the humerus is concave, which is a sign of a substantial cap of cartilage at the head of humerus. The humerus of Pistosaurus also lacks entepicondylar foramen.

Pistosaurus has a strongly flattened ulna. It has medium length and nearly symmetrical in dorsal view. Its anterior margin is more curved and thicker than the posterior one. This feature broads the wide spatium interosseum enclosed between radius and ulna. The proximal end of radius is less expanded than that of ulna, while the distal end is less expanded than proximal one but thickened. The anterior margin is nearly straight while the posterior margin is more curved compared to the anterior one. Like other sauropterygians, the radius of Pistosaurus is slightly longer than the ulna.

==== Pelvic girdle ====
The pelvic girdle of Pistosaurus is more similar to primitive sauropterygians than to plesiosaurs.

The ilium of Pistosaurus has an iliac blade, which has almost parallel anterior and posterior margins. Same as other non-plesiosaur sauropterygians, the ilium in Pistosaurus contacts both the pubis and the ischium, forming a ring-like structure. The ilium from Pistosaurus is relatively large in size compared to Nothosaurus, whose ilia did not appear to have any elongated blade.

The femur of Pistosaurus is longer than its humerus. Its anterior margin is almost straight whereas the posterior margin is concave. According to the specimen provided by paleontologist Sues, the proximal articular end is much more robust than the distal one, and is more or less triangular in transverse section.

== Classification ==
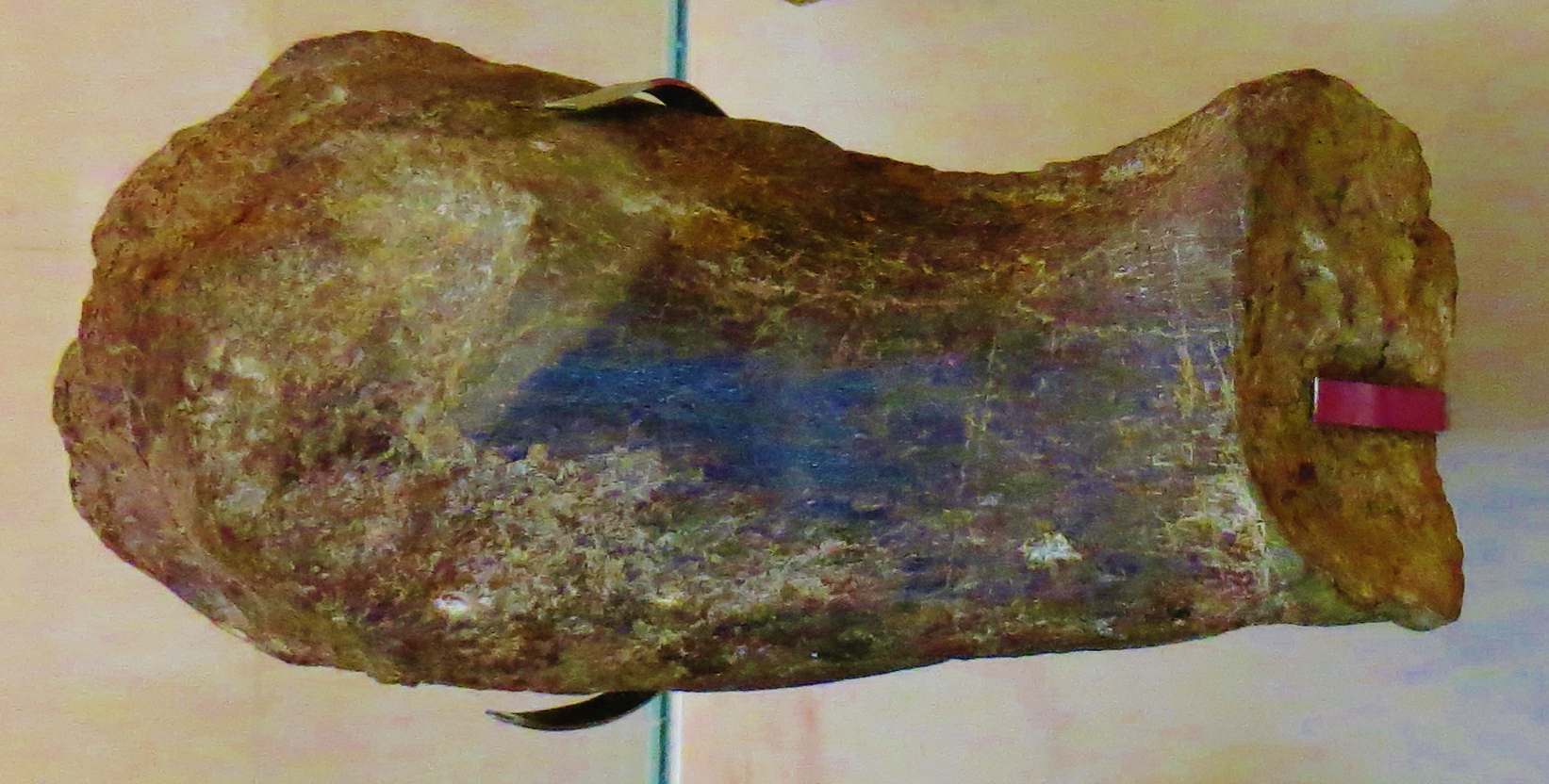
Limb bone

Although it is unlikely that Pistosaurus was a direct ancestor of the plesiosaurs, the mixture of features suggests that it was closely related to that group.

The following cladogram follows an analysis by Ketchum & Benson, 2011.

The classification for Plesiosauria was difficult at the first place. The anatomy of stem group Sauropterygia has very primitive synapomorphies such as dermal palate. Initially, Plesiosauria were suggested related to Pistosauroidea, which belongs to Eusauropterygia from Triassic. Three genera of Plesiosauria was known in the history: Corosaurus alvocensis, Cymatosaurus, and Pistosaurus longaevus. A later discovery of a new Pistosauridea from middle triassic of Nevada by paleontologist Sander indicates that Augustasaurus is closely related to Pistosaurus, while there are several difference including axial skeleton.

- Pistosauria
  - "Pistosaurus postcranium"
  - - Augustasaurus hagdorni
    - Bobosaurus forojuliensis
    - Pistosaurus
    - Yunguisaurus liae
    - Plesiosauria
      - Pliosauroidea
        - Pliosauridae
          - Thalassiodracon hawkinsii
          - - Hauffiosaurus spp.
            - - Attenborosaurus conybeari
              - advanced pliosaurids
        - Rhomaleosauridae
          - Anningasaura lymense
          - - advanced rhomaleosaurids
            - - "Plesiosaurus" macrocephalus
              - - Archaeonectrus rostratus
                - Macroplata tenuiceps
      - Plesiosauroidea
        - Stratesaurus taylori
        - - Plesiosauridae
            - Seeleyosaurus guilelmiimperatoris
            - - OUMNH J.28585
              - Plesiosaurus dolichodeirus
          - - Elasmosauridae and Cryptoclidia
            - - Microcleidus homalospondylus
              - - Hydrorion brachypterygius
                - Occitanosaurus tournemiensis

== Geological environment information ==
There are several different ways for aquatic tetrapods to counteract their positive buoyancy caused by their lungs: pachyostosis, osteosclerosis, pachyosteosclerosis, and calcified cartilage of bone. The ultimate goal of these processes is to increase density for different parts of the body to offset the buoyancy, in order to live in an aquatic/semi-aquatic environment. Bone histology of Pistosaurus studied by paleontologist Krahl showed that the medullary region of the humeri was filled, and it contained calcified cartilage incorporated into endoseal bone. According to Krahl, the small medullary region of is the result from a suppressed perimedullary resorption activity, which is associated with osteosclerosis.

Paleontologist Diedrich examined other pectoral and pelvic girdles of this taxon. Together with the muscle grooves, they determined that a slight subaquatic flying starts with Pistosaurus, and most of the propulsion occurs on the hindlimbs. The presence of enlarged coracoid and pubis bones in the pelvic girdle indicated that there was possibility for Pistosaurus to develop flipper-like extremities. Furthermore, the underwater flying mode suggested by paleontologist Michael A. Taylor indicates that the left and right limbs of Plesiosaurus would simultaneously beat together. This feature contrasts to the terrestrial reptiles who use their right and left limbs for locomotion alternatively.

== Historical information and discovery ==
Non-plesiosaurian sauropterygian fossils are found in various locations in China, Europe, North America, Palestine, and Tunisia. Although Nothosaurus, which is closely related to Pistosaurus, is known from several remains found across Europe, the latter's skull was only found in the Germanic Basin in Upper Muschelkalk.

The early discovery of Pistosaurus' skull was made by H. V. Meyer. He discovered two skulls and a postcranial skeleton at the same location, possibly from Pistosaurus. Later after that, a new and well-preserved postcranial skeleton was also found at the same location as the previous specimens. Geissler first described the skeletons and then Strunz developed a new hypothesis based on that. This skeleton was originally preserved at Strunz's collection in Senckenberg Museum at Frankfurt.

Although the Pistosauroidea has long been considered as structural antecedents of plesiosaurs, a new specimen of Augustasaurus, discovered by paleontologist Sandra from Nevada, had raised to debunk this theory. Opposed to previous hypotheses, the forelimb of Augustasaurus was greatly reduced compared to Plesiosaurus. Therefore, Pistosauroidea was removed from stem group Plesiosauria and became a paraphyletic group to Plesiosauria.

Avascular necrosis, also known as bone necrosis, is associated with decompression syndrome (DCS). It is caused by exposed rapid decrease of external pressure as well as rapid ascent in water column. These features are often recognized in Triassic sauropterygians. According to Surmik, the presence of decompression syndrome-related avascular necrosis in Pistosaurus forelimbs suggested that it lived in aquatic or semi-aquatic environments. He also stated the possibility of it being distributed in open marine cold waters, and their effective metabolism is one of the reasons why this animal can survive into the open sea.
