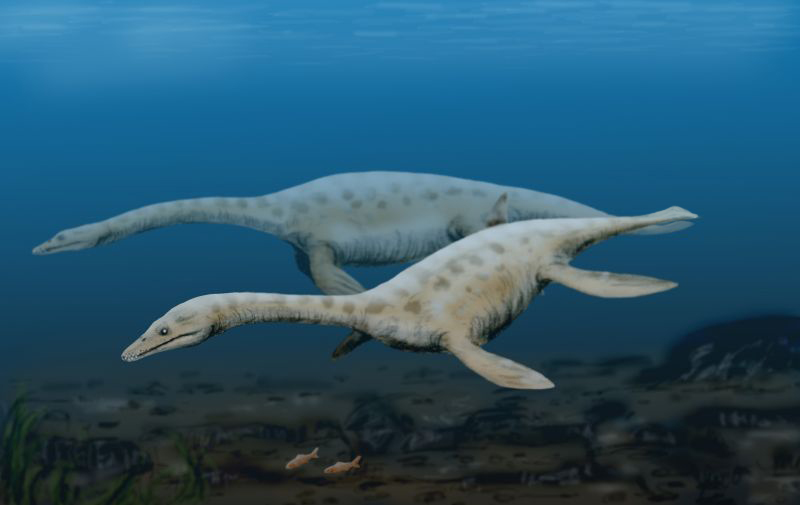
- Life restoration of Augustasaurus hagdorni

Scientific classification
- Kingdom: Animalia
- Phylum: Chordata
- Class: Reptilia
- Superorder: †Sauropterygia
- Clade: †Eosauropterygia
- Clade: †Pistosauroidea; Baur, 1887-90

Subgroups
- †Chinchenia; †Corosaurus; †Cymatosaurus; †Kwangsisaurus; †Tanaisosaurus; †Wangosaurus; †Pistosauria; †Augustasaurus; †Bobosaurus; †Pistosaurus; †Yunguisaurus; †Plesiosauria

= Pistosauroidea =

Pistosauroidea Temporal range: Early Triassic-Late Cretaceous, 251–66 Ma

Extinct clade of reptiles

Pistosauroidea is a group of marine reptiles within the superorder Sauropterygia that first appeared in the latter part of the Early Triassic and were the ancestors of plesiosaurs. Pistosauroids are rare in Triassic marine assemblages, and are represented by only a few fossils from central Europe, the United States, and China. Recent phylogenetic analyses consider the Triassic pistosauroids to be a paraphyletic grouping, meaning that they do not form a true clade. Plesiosauria is now placed within Pistosauroidea, while the traditional pistosauroids are successively more basal, or primitive, sauropterygians.

Below is a cladogram of pistosauroid relationships from Cheng et al. (2006):

- Sauropterygia
  - Placodontia
  - - Pachypleurosauria
    - Nothosauria
    - Pistosauroidea
      - Corosaurus
      - Cymatosaurus
      - - Pistosaurus
        - - Yunguisaurus
          - - Augustasaurus
            - Plesiosauria

Below is a cladogram of pistosauroid relationships from Ketchum & Benson, 2011:

- Pistosauroidea
  - Cymatosaurus
  - Pistosauria
    - "Pistosaurus postcranium"
    - - Bobosaurus
      - Pistosaurus
      - Yunguisaurus
      - - Augustasaurus
        - Plesiosauria
