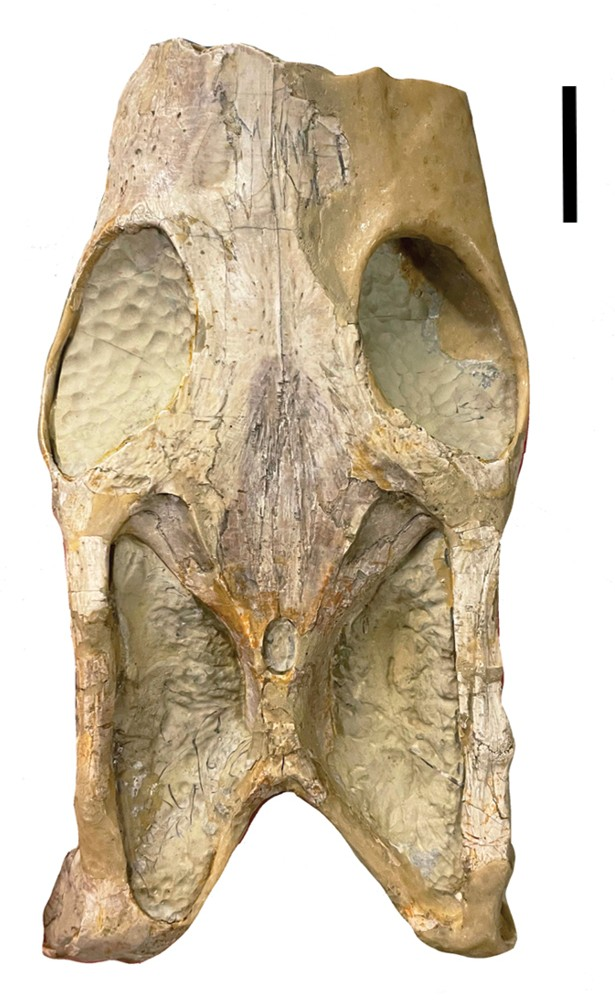
- C. erikae holotype skull

Scientific classification
- Kingdom: Animalia
- Phylum: Chordata
- Class: Reptilia
- Superorder: †Sauropterygia
- Clade: †Pistosauroidea
- Family: †Cymatosauridae
- Genus: †Cymatosaurus; Fritsch, 1894

Species
- †C. fridericianus Fritsch, 1894 (type); †C. latifrons Gürich, 1884; †C. multidentatus (von Huene, 1958); †C. minor Rieppel & Wernburg, 1998; †C. erikae Maisch, 2014

= Cymatosaurus =

Cymatosaurus Temporal range: Early-Middle Triassic, 247.5–237 Ma

Extinct genus of reptiles

Cymatosaurus is an extinct genus of pistosauroid or nothosauriform sauropterygian. It is known to have been alive from the Early Triassic to the Middle Triassic period (latest Olenekian to Anisian stages) of Germany and they seem to originate from the Netherlands. It was small to medium-sized for an eosauropterygian, measuring 1–1.2 metres (3.3–3.9 ft) long.

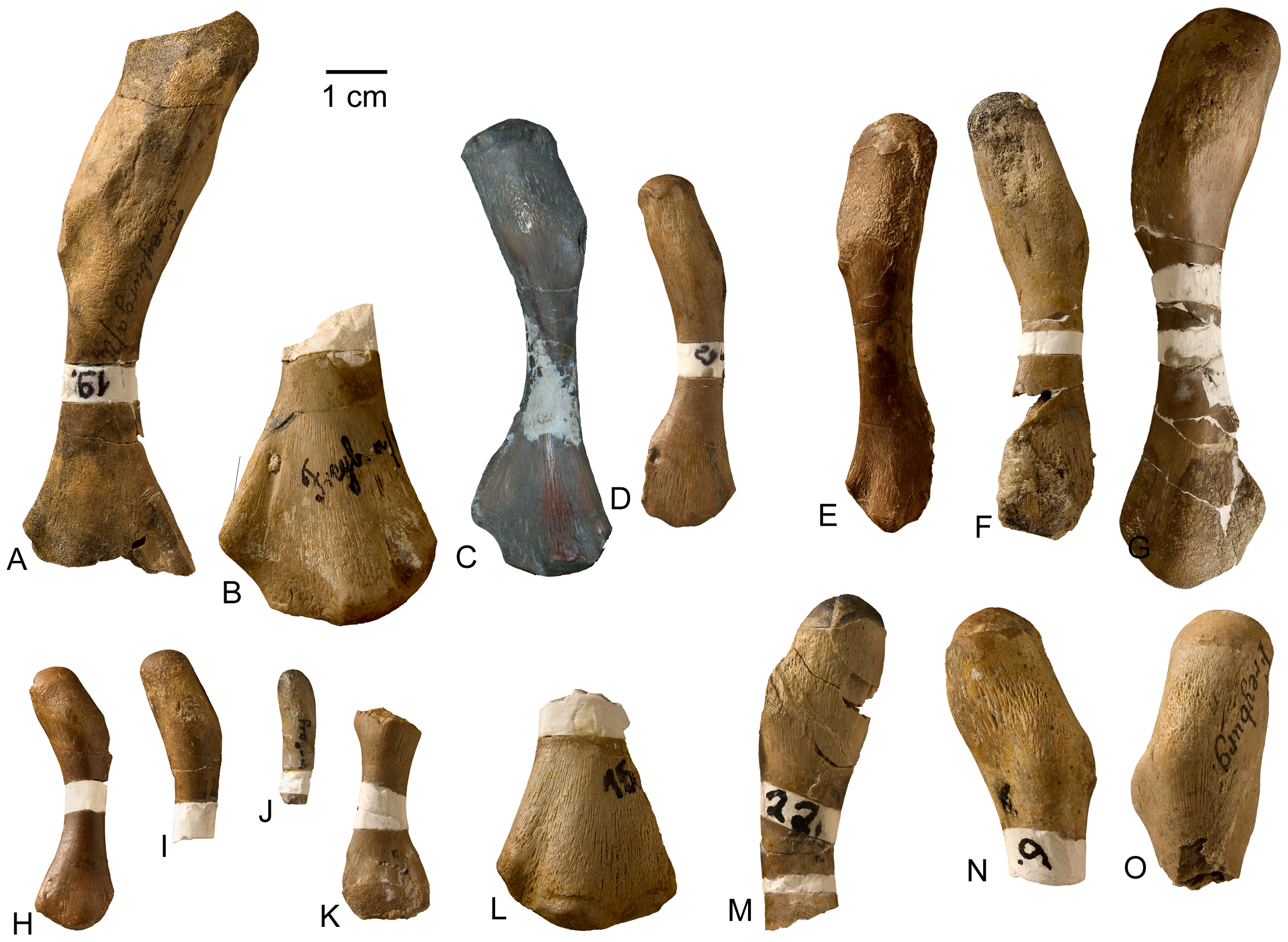
Cymatosaurus and pachypleurosaur humeri

== See also ==
- Timeline of plesiosaur research
