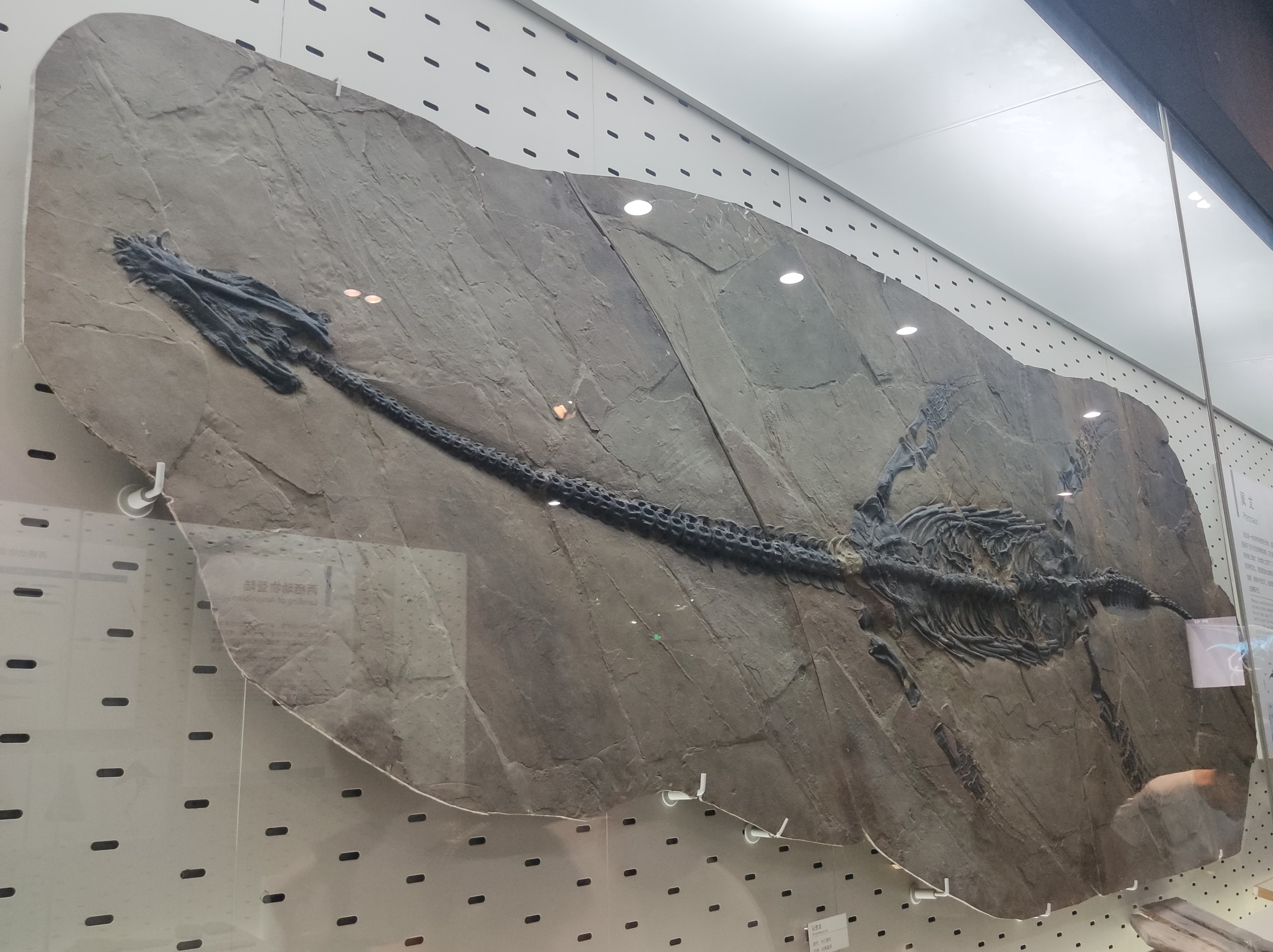
- Fossil in Zhejiang Natural Museum

Scientific classification
- Kingdom: Animalia
- Phylum: Chordata
- Class: Reptilia
- Superorder: †Sauropterygia
- Clade: †Pistosauria
- Genus: †Yunguisaurus; Cheng et al., 2006
- Species: †Y. liae

Binomial name
- †Yunguisaurus liae Cheng et al., 2006

= Yunguisaurus =

Yunguisaurus Temporal range: Late Triassic, Carnian

Extinct genus of reptiles

Yunguisaurus is an extinct genus of pistosaur known from the Guizhou Province of China.

== Description ==
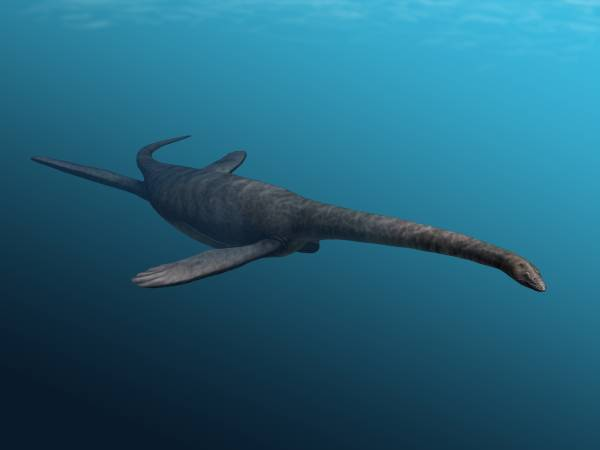
Life restoration

Yunguisaurus is known from the holotype NMNS 004529/F003862, an articulated and almost complete skeleton missing only the distal tail. The preserved skeleton has a length of about 1.7 metres (5.6 ft) with estimated total length about 2.3 metres (7.5 ft), while paratype specimen became much larger with length around 4.2 metres (14 ft). It was collected near Huangnihe River, Chajiang of Guizhou, from the Falang Formation. It is thought to belong to the Paragondolella naantangensis-P. polygnathiformis Assemblage Zone, dating to the Carnian stage of the early Late Triassic. It differs from other pistosauroids by a combination of characters. Nevertheless, its original description is a preliminary report while the postcranial skeleton still waits for further preparation and full description.

== Etymology ==
Yunguisaurus was first named by Yen-Nien Cheng, Tamaki Sato, Xiao-Chun Wu and Chun Li in 2006 and the type species is Yunguisaurus liae. The generic name is derived from the Yunnan–Guizhou Plateau (simplified Chinese: 云贵高原; traditional Chinese: 雲貴高原; pinyin: Yúnguì Gāoyuán), a landform named after the Yunnan and Guizhou provinces that is also abbreviated as the Yungi Plateau. This plateau is home to the fossil site in which the holotype was found, and saurus (σαῦρος), Greek for "lizard". The specific name honors IVPP Professor Jinling Li for contributing to the recent study of the Chinese Triassic marine vertebrate fauna.
