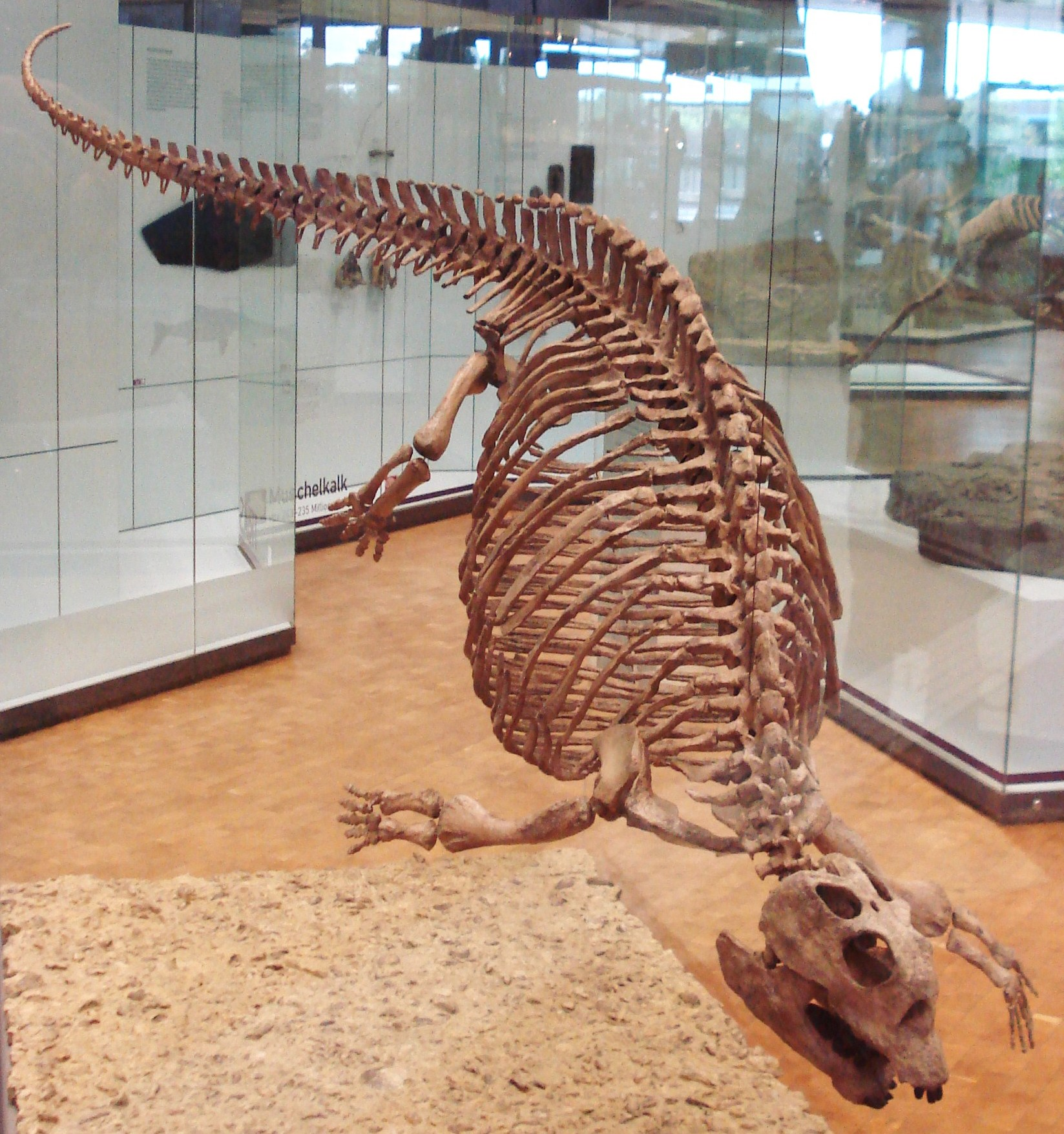
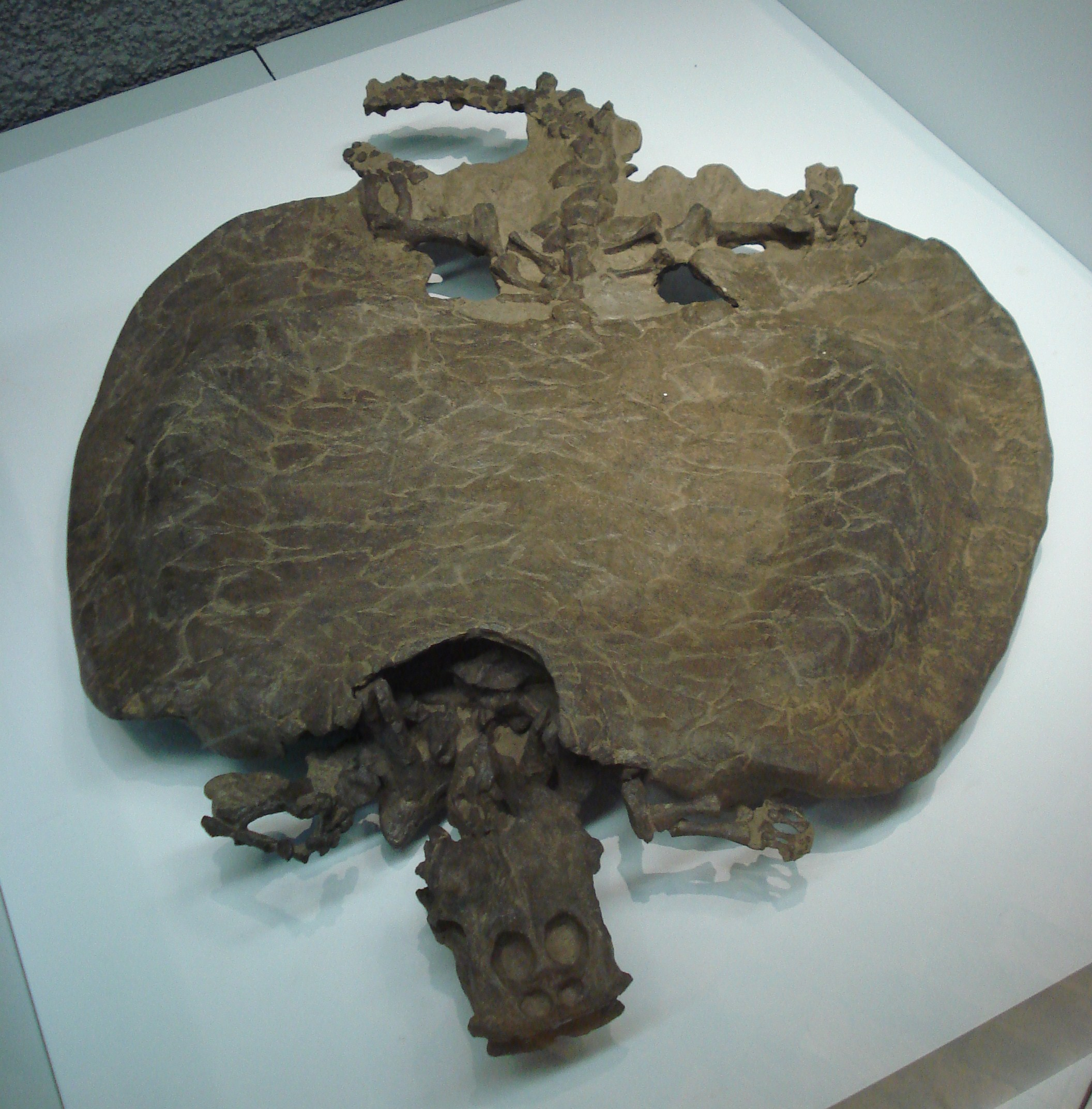
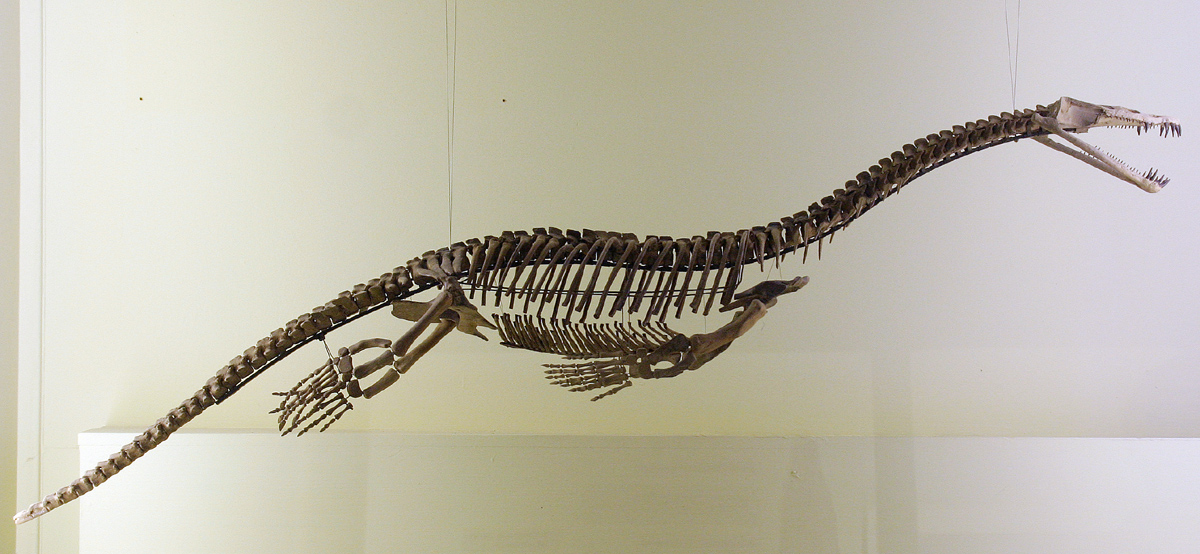
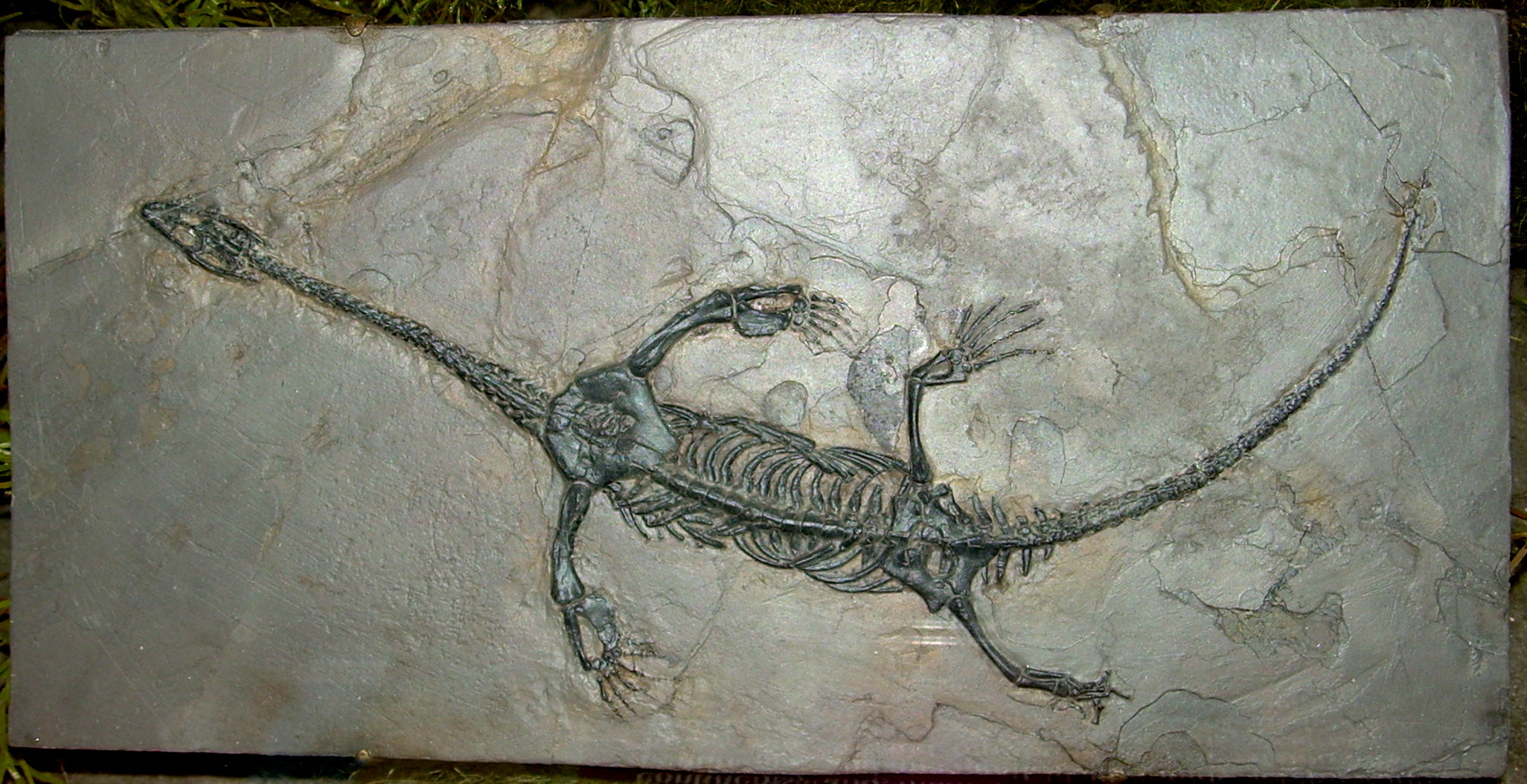
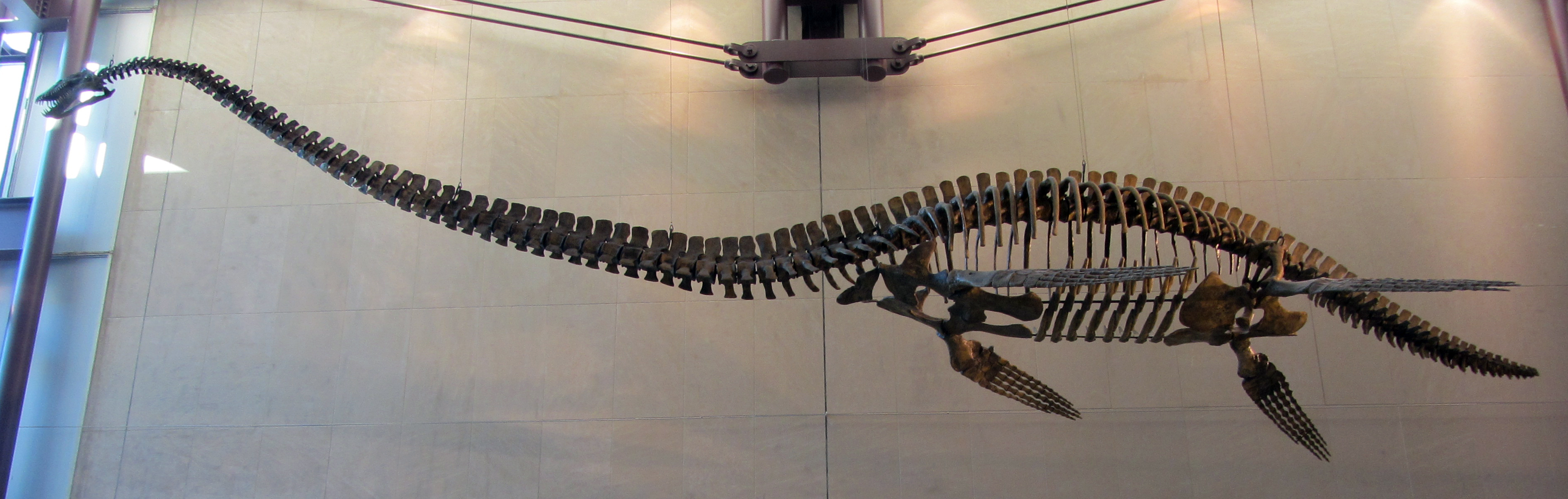
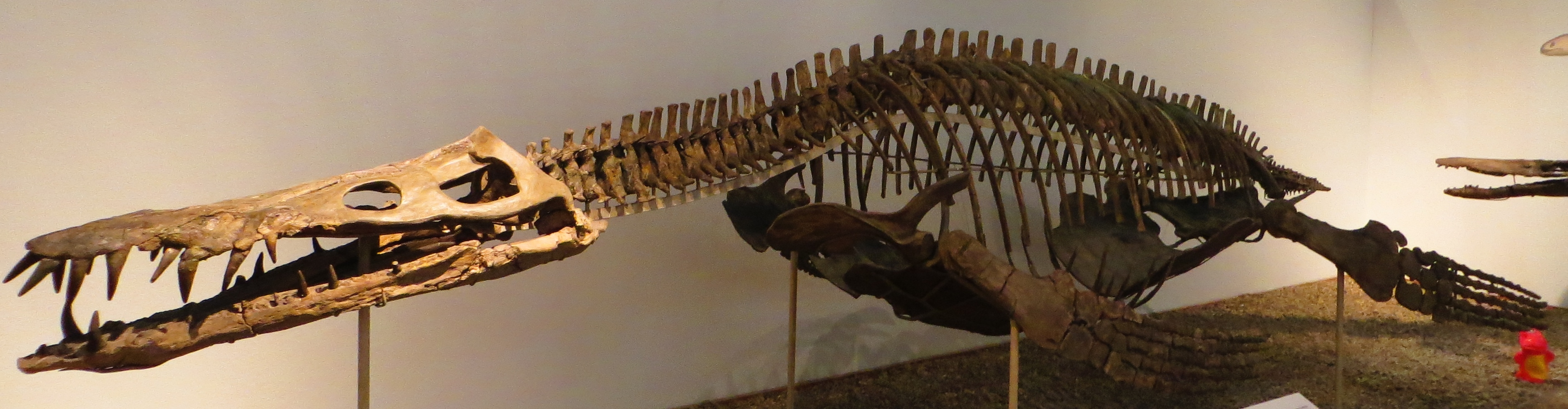
- Various sauropterygians: Top row: Placodus (left) and Henodus (right) (both placodonts) Middle row: the nothosaur Nothosaurus (left) and pachypleurosaur Keichousaurus (right) Bottom row: plesiosauroid Thalassomedon (left) and pliosaur Liopleurodon (right)

Scientific classification
- Kingdom: Animalia
- Phylum: Chordata
- Class: Reptilia
- Clade: †Sauropterygiformes
- Superorder: †Sauropterygia; Owen, 1860

Subgroups
- †Atopodentatus; †Hanosaurus; †Spatulidentatus; †Placodontiformes; †Palatodonta?; †Placodontia; †Saurosphargidae?; †Eosauropterygia; †Nothosauria; †Pachypleurosauria; †Pistosauroidea; †Plesiosauria

= Sauropterygia =

Sauropterygians Temporal range: Early Triassic - Late Cretaceous, 247–66 Ma

Group of Mesozoic aquatic reptiles

Sauropterygia ("lizard flippers") is an extinct clade of diverse, generally marine reptiles that developed from terrestrial ancestors soon after the end-Permian extinction and flourished during the Triassic before all except for the Plesiosauria became extinct at the end of that period. The plesiosaurs would continue to diversify until the end of the Mesozoic, when they became extinct as part of the end-Cretaceous mass extinction. Other than being diapsids, their affinities to other reptiles have long been contentious. Sometimes suggested to be closely related to turtles, other proposals have considered them most closely related to Lepidosauromorpha or Archosauromorpha, and/or the marine reptile groups Thalattosauria and Ichthyosauromorpha.

== Description ==
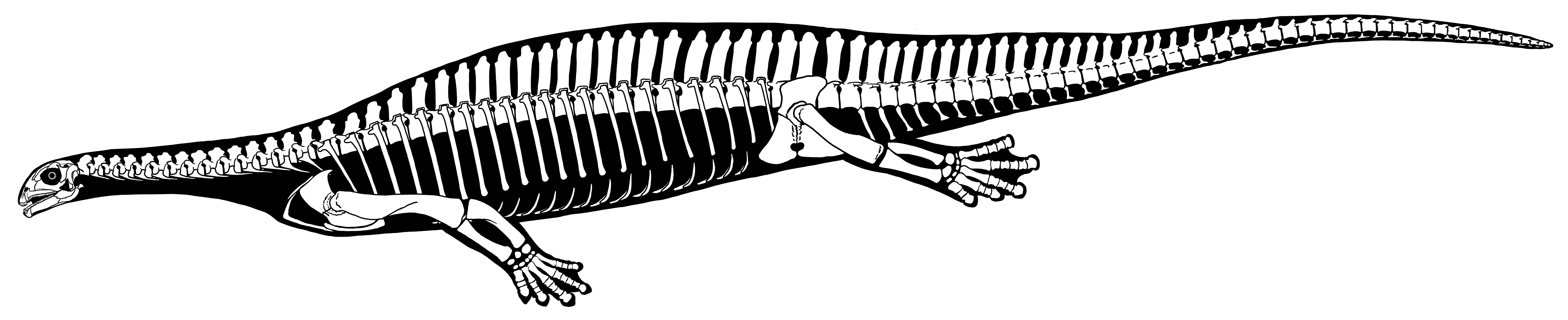
Skeleton of the primitive sauropterygian Atopodentatus

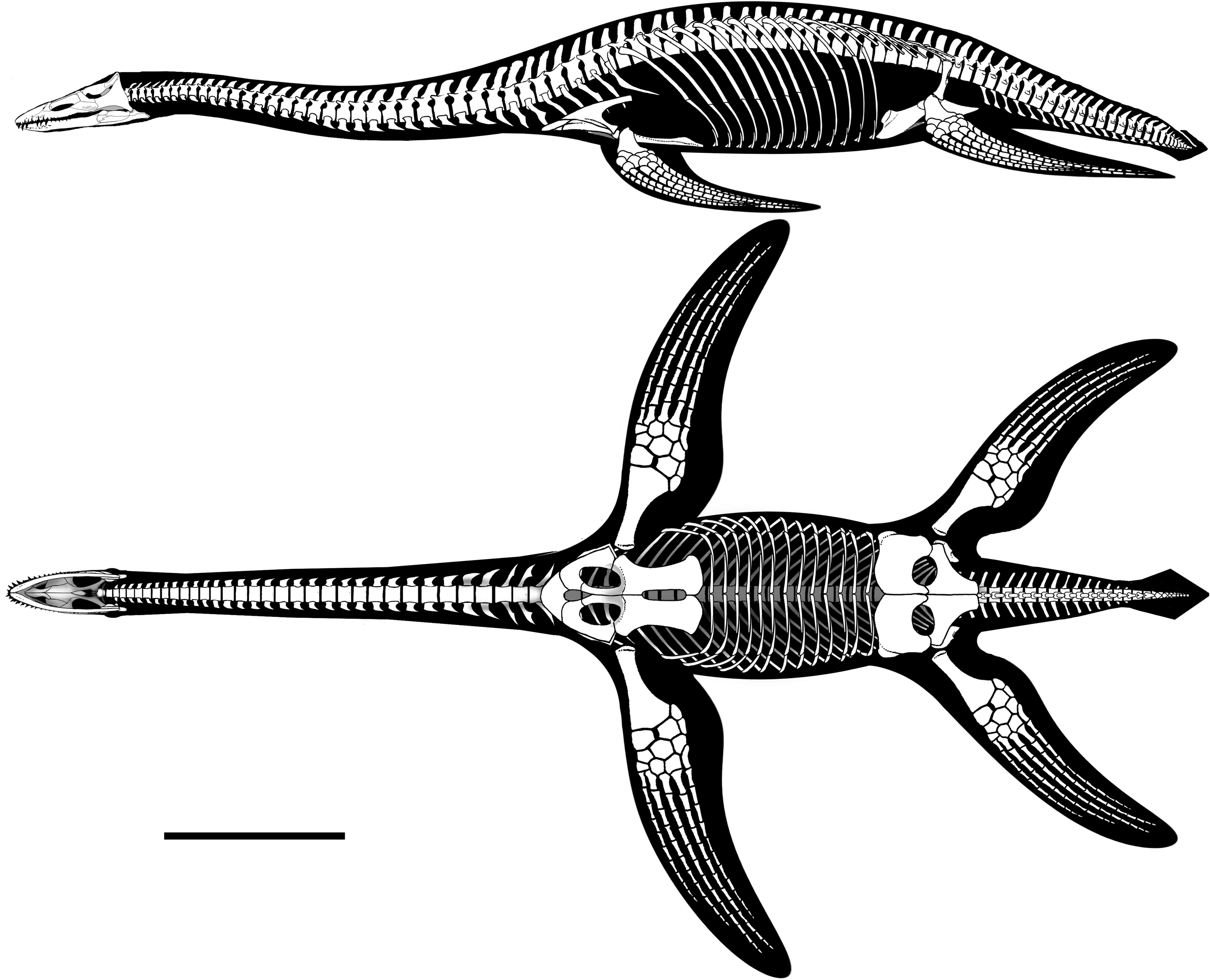
Skeleton of the plesiosaur Brancasaurus

Sauropterygians are characterised by a number of traits, including having only a single upper temporal fenestra rather than two temporal fenestrae as is ancestral for diapsids, the supratemporal, postparietal, tabular, and lacrimal bones of the skull have been lost, the nares (external nasal opening) is retracted, there is a large retroarticular process on the mandible, the trunk vertebrae lack intercentra, the sacrum is composed of three or more vertebrae, a sternum is absent, the scapula is positioned superficially relative to the clavicle, the scapulocoracoid is divided, the pectoral and thyroid bear fenestration. Other characters suggested to be ancestral for Sauropterygia include the squamosal bone descends to the lower (ventral) margin of the skull, the quadrate bone of the skull is covered by the squamosal and quadratojugal when the skull is viewed side-on (lateral view), the bones exhibit pachyostosis (high density), a reduced or absent posterior process on the interclavicle, a curved humerus, and intertrochanteric fossa is small but distinct.

The number of vertebrae is highly variable, with several lineages of Eosauropterygia repeatedly independently developing a long neck by increasing the overall number of cervical vertebrae, taken to the extreme in elasmosaurid plesiosaurs, which have up to 76 neck vertebrae, with the long neck ancestral for plesiosaurs becoming secondarily shortened in some plesiosaur lineages like pliosaurs. By contrast, placodonts have very short necks with only 6 vertebrae. The anatomy of the bony labyrinth of the inner ear is variable, being crocodilian-like in Triassic sauropterygians, while those of plesiosaurs is generally more sea-turtle-like.

The vast majority of sauropterygians are generally thought to have relied on using their limbs to propel themselves through the water (paraxial propulsion) as opposed to undulating their bodies as is typical of living reptiles like crocodilians, with their trunk regions being relatively stiff. While plesiosaurs developed highly specialised paddle-like limbs, the limbs of non-plesiosaur sauropterygians are less specialised. Non-placodont sauropterygians generally have streamlined bodies. Many placodonts are covered in a layer of dermal armour. Compared to earlier diapsids, members of Eosauropterygia show a radical transformation of the pectoral girdle, including ventral (towards the underside of the body) expansions of the coracoid and scapula, as well as the development of a strong clavicular arch. Members of Eosauropterygia are also characterised by slender and curved femurs. They also lack osteoderms which are present in some other sauropterygians.

== Ecology ==
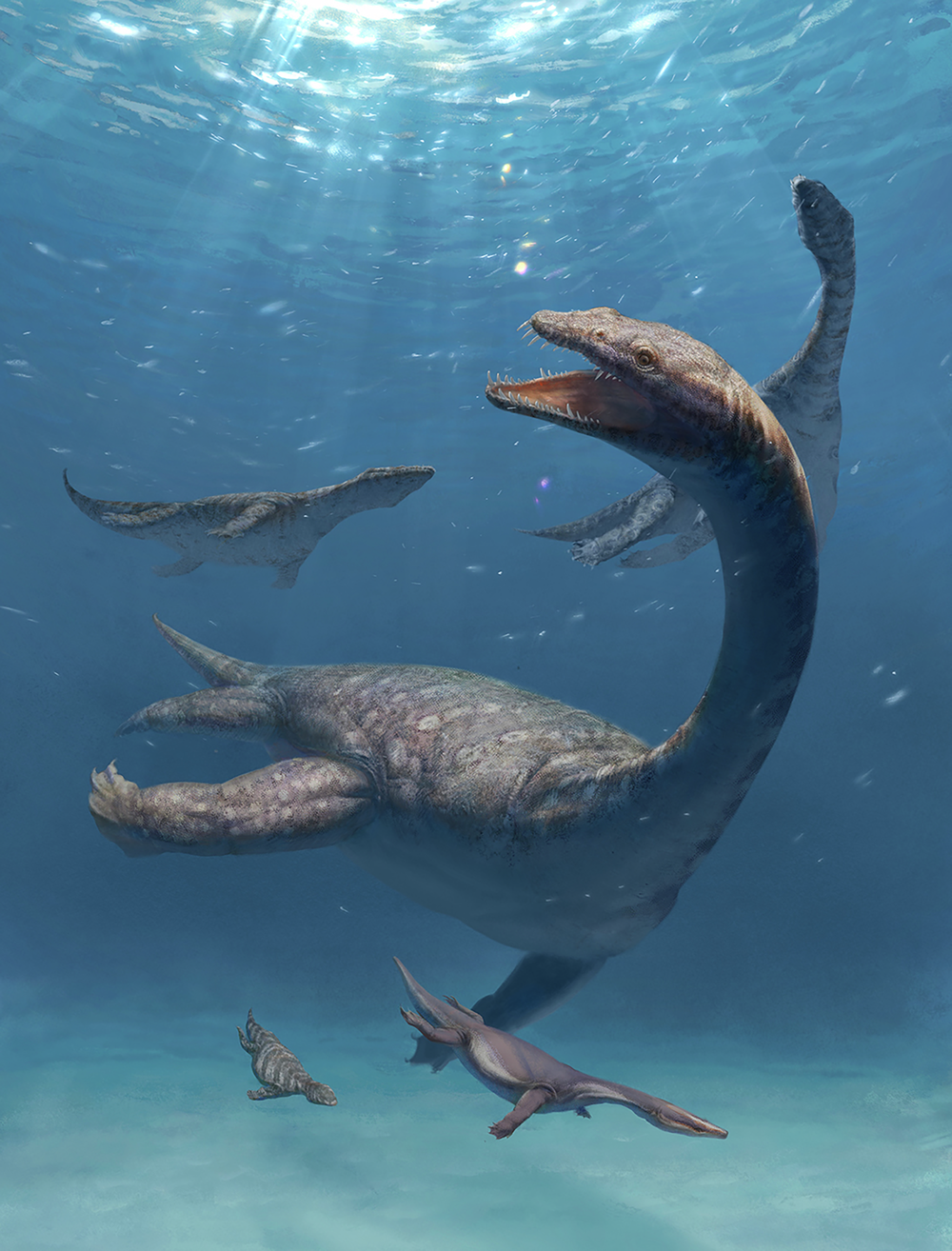
Restoration of several nothosaurians known from the Middle Triassic of China: Key: Lijiangosaurus yongshengensis (central) Nothosaurus yangjuanensis (upper left) Nothosaurus luopingensis (upper right) Brevicaudosaurus jiyangshanensis (lower left) Lariosaurus hongguoensis (lower right)

Placodonts are thought to have been durophagous, using rounded teeth (including those on the upper and lower jaws, as well as palatal teeth on the roof of the mouth) to crush hard shelled organisms. Members of Eosauropterygia are thought to have been piscivores and carnivores. Sauropterygians were generally marine, though some Jurassic and Cretaceous plesiosaurs are suggested to have inhabited bodies of freshwater. While pleisosaurs were fully aquatic, some non-plesiosaur sauropterygians may have been capable of limited terrestrial locomotion. Plesiosaurs as well as some other sauropterygians including the pachypleurosaur Keichousaurus and the nothosaurs Lariosaurus and Nothosaurus are thought to have been viviparous, bearing live young. At least some other sauropterygians may have been oviparous (egg-laying). Plesiosaurs are suggested to have been endothermic (warm blooded), and other sauropterygians may have had elevated metabolic rates compared to modern ectothermic (cold-blooded) reptiles.

== Origins and evolution ==
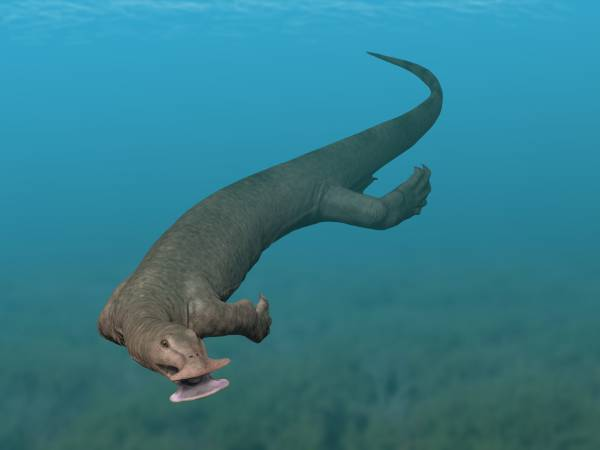
Life restoration of Atopodentatus, an early diverging sauropterygian from the Middle Triassic of China

The earliest sauropterygians appeared about 248-247 million years ago (Ma) during the Spathian towards the end of the Early Triassic, by which time they already showed considerable diversification. By the Middle Triassic, some sauropterygians had already reached large body sizes, with some nothosaurs belonging to the genus Nothosaurus from this time period reaching a body length of 5–7 metres (16–23 ft). The Triassic-Jurassic extinction event wiped out all sauropterygians aside from the plesiosaurs, which would continue to diversify until the end of the Mesozoic, when they would be wiped out by the K-Pg extinction event.

=== Classification and relationships to other reptiles ===
It has long been uncertain how Sauropterygia is related to other reptile groups. The demands of an aquatic environment caused the same features to evolve multiple times among reptiles, an example of convergent evolution. Sauropterygians are widely agreed to be diapsids, and since the late 1990s, scientists have suggested that they may be closely related to turtles, though this hypothesis has later been questioned. Placodonts are generally considered the sister group to the rest of Sauropterygia.

Several analyses of sauropterygian relationships since the beginning of the 2010s have suggested that they are more closely related to archosaurs (birds and crocodilians) than to lepidosaurs (lizards and snakes). Some authors have suggested that sauropterygians form a clade with two other groups of marine reptiles, Ichthyosauromorpha and Thalattosauria, with this clade either being placed as non-saurian diapsids or as basal archosauromorphs.

Some other Triassic marine reptiles have been suggested to be more closely related to Sauropterygia than to Ichthyosauromorpha and Thalattosauria, including Hanosaurus, Helveticosaurus, Palatodonta, Eusaurosphargis, and Saurosphargidae (some studies find varying members of this group to be within Sauropterygia proper). Wang et al. 2022 coined Sauropterygiformes to include Sauropterygia (which was found to include Palatodonta) proper, as well as Hanosaurus, Helveticosaurus, and Saurosphargidae (including Eusaurosphargis as a member). Wolniewicz, et al. 2023 coined the clade Sauropterygomorpha to include Sauropterygians and their closest relatives, also including Palatodonta and Eusaurosphargis (Saurosphargidae not including Eusaurosphargis, and Hanosaurus were found to be within Sauropterygia proper) but not Helveticosaurus (which was found to basal to Sauropterygomorpha but more closely related to Sauropterygomorpha than to other reptiles).

The cladogram shown hereafter is the result of an analysis of sauropterygian relationships (using just fossil evidence) conducted by Neenan and colleagues (2013), which placed the clade as the sister group to Sauria (Archosauromorpha + Lepidosauromorpha).

- - Pantestudines
  - - - Lepidosauromorpha
        - †Kuehneosauridae
        - Lepidosauria
      - Archosauromorpha
        - †Prolacertiformes
        - - †Choristodera
          - - - †Rhynchosauria
              - †Trilophosaurus
            - Archosauriformes
    - - †Ichthyopterygia
      - - †Thalattosauria
        - - - †Eusaurosphargis
            - †Hanosaurus
          - - †Helveticosaurus
            - - †Sinosaurosphargis
              - Sauropterygia
                - †Placodontiformes
                  - †Palatodonta
                  - †Placodontia
                    - †Paraplacodus
                    - - †Placodus
                      - - †Cyamodus
                        - †Psephoderma
                - Eosauropterygia
                  - Pistosauria
                    - †Yunguisaurus
                    - - †Plesiosauria
                      - - †Pistosaurus
                        - †Augustasaurus
                  - - - †Corosaurus
                      - †Cymatosaurus
                    - - Nothosauria
                        - †Simosaurus
                        - - †Germanosaurus
                          - - †Nothosaurus
                            - †Lariosaurus
                      - - †Diandongosaurus
                        - Pachypleurosauria
                          - †Dianopachysaurus
                          - †Keichousaurus
                          - †Wumengosaurus
                          - †Anarosaurus-Dactylosaurus
                          - †Neusticosaurus-Serpianosaurus

The cladogram shown below follows the most likely result found by an analysis of turtle relationships using both fossil and genetic evidence by M.S. Lee, in 2013. This analysis resolved Sauropterygia as a paraphyletic assemblage of stem turtles within Archosauromorpha.

- Crown Reptilia/ Sauria
  - Pan-Lepidosauria / Lepidosauromorpha
  - Archelosauria/ Archosauromorpha s. l.
    - Pan-Archosauria
      - †Choristodera
      - Archosauromorpha s. s.
        - †Prolacertiformes
        - - - †Trilophosaurus
            - †Rhynchosauria
          - Archosauriformes
    - Pan-Testudines/ Pantestudines
      - - †Eosauropterygia
        - - †Placodontia
          - - †Sinosaurosphargis
            - - †Odontochelys
              - Testudinata
                - †Proganochelys
                - Testudines

In the cladistic analysis of Shcoch and Sues 2015, Sauropterygia was placed within Pantestudines, the latter recovered within Lepidosauromorpha (the clade including modern lizards and snakes):

- Sauria (=Archelosauria)
  - Archosauromorpha
  - Lepidosauromorpha (=Ankylopoda)
    - - - †Kuehneosauridae
        - Lepidosauria
          - Squamata
          - Rhynchocephalia
      - Pantestudines
        - †Sauropterygia
          - †Eosauropterygia
          - - †Sinosaurosphargis
            - †Placodontia
        - - †Eunotosaurus
          - - †Pappochelys
            - - †Odontochelys
              - Testudinata
                - †Proganochelys
                - Testudines

The following cladogram was found by Simões et al. (2022), where Sauropterygia was recovered within a larger clade of marine reptiles, including ichthyosauromorphs and thalattosaurs, diverging after pantestudines within Archosauromorpha:

- Neoreptilia
  - †Procolophonia
  - Neodiapsida
    - †Younginiformes
    - - †Eunotosaurus
      - - †Weigeltisauridae
        - Sauria
          - Lepidosauromorpha
            - Rhynchocephalia (tuatara and their extinct relatives)
            - Squamata (lizards and snakes)
          - Archelosauria
            - Pantestudines (turtles and extinct relatives)
            - Archosauromorpha
              - - †Ichthyosauromorpha
                - - †Sauropterygia
                  - †Thalattosauria
              - - †Protorosauria
                  - †Protorosauridae
                  - - †Tanystropheidae
                    - - †Drepanosauromorpha
                      - †Kuehneosauridae
                - - - †Allokotosauria
                    - †Rhynchosauria
                  - Archosauriformes (crocodiles, birds, and their extinct relatives)

In the cladistic analyses of Jenkins et al. 2026, two alternate placements for Sauropterygia were recovered; their parsimony analysis placed the clade as the earliest-diverging lineage of archosauromorphs, with turtles recovered more closely related to modern archosaurs. In contrast, the Bayesian analysis placed sauropterygians within Lepidosauromorpha. The results of the former analysis are displayed in the cladogram below:

- Neodiapsida
  - †Saurosternon
  - - †Younginidae
    - - †Tangasauridae
      - - †Claudiosaurus
        - - †Weigeltisauridae
          - †Drepanosauromorpha
          - Sauria/Reptilia
            - Lepidosauromorpha
            - Archosauromorpha
              - †Sauropterygia
              - - †Protorosaurus
                - Archelosauria
                  - Pantestudines
                  - - †Tanystropheidae
                    - - †Prolacerta
                      - - †Allokotosauria
                        - - †Rhynchosauria
                          - - †Teyujagua
                            - Archosauriformes (including Archosauria)
