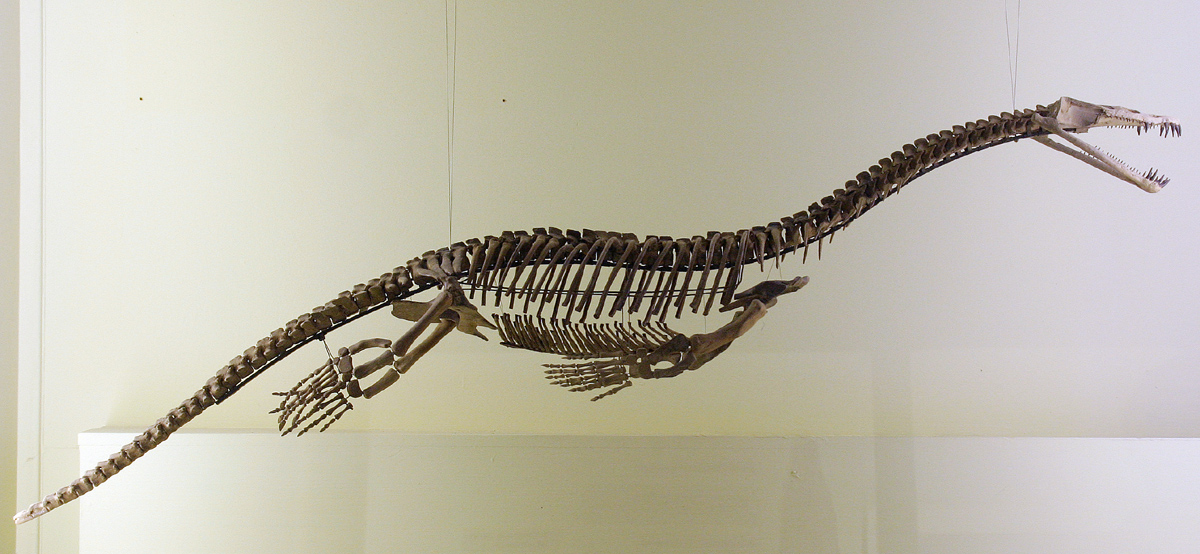
- Nothosaurus marchicus skeleton restoration in Berlin

Scientific classification
- Kingdom: Animalia
- Phylum: Chordata
- Class: Reptilia
- Superorder: †Sauropterygia
- Order: †Nothosauroidea
- Suborder: †Nothosauria
- Family: †Nothosauridae
- Subfamily: †Nothosaurinae; Nopcsa, 1923
- Genus: †Nothosaurus; Münster, 1834

Type species
- †Nothosaurus mirabilis Münster, 1834

Species
- N. cristatus Hinz, Matzke & Pfretzschner, 2019; N. cymatosauroides Sanz, 1983; N. edingerae Schultze, 1970; N. fortihumeralis Li et al., 2026; N. giganteus Münster, 1834; N. haasi Rieppel et al., 1997; N. jagisteus Rieppel, 2001; N. luopingensis Shang et al. 2022; N. marchicus Koken, 1893; N. mirabilis Münster, 1834 (type); N. tchernovi Haas, 1980; N. yangjuanensis Jiang et al., 2006; N. zhangi Liu et al., 2014

Synonyms
- Genus synonymy: Conchiosaurus Meyer, 1834; Chondriosaurus Meyer, 1838; Dracosaurus Agassiz, 1846; Elmosaurus Huene, 1957; Kolposaurus Skuphos, 1893; Menodon Meyer, 1838; Oligolycus Fristch, 1894; Opeosaurus Meyer, 1847; Paranothosaurus Peyer, 1939; Shingyisaurus Young, 1965; Species synonymy: Elmosaurus lelmensis Huene, 1957; Nothosaurus blezingeri Fraas, 1896; Nothosaurus schimperi Meyer, 1834; Nothosaurus angustidens Meyer, 1844; Shingyisaurus unexpectus Young, 1965 Synonyms of N. giganteus: Nothosaurus andriani Meyer, 1839; Nothosaurus angustifronis Meyer, 1844; Nothosaurus aduncidens Meyer, 1853; Nothosaurus baruthicus Geissler, 1895; Nothosaurus chelydrops Fraas, 1896; Paranothosaurus amsleri Peyer, 1939 Synonyms of N. marchicus: Conchiosaurus clavatus Meyer, 1834; Nothosaurus crassus Schroeder, 1914; Nothosaurus friedericanus Jaekel, 1911; Nothosaurus oldenburgi Schröder, 1914; Nothosaurus procerus Schröder, 1914; Nothosaurus raabi Schröder, 1914; Nothosaurus schroderi Huene, 1944; Nothosaurus venustus Münster, 1834; Nothosaurus winterswijkensis Albers and Rieppel, 2003 Synonyms of N. mirabilis: Dracosaurus bronni Giebel, 1847; Ichthyosaurus lunevillensis Alberti, 1837; Nothosaurus bergeri Meyer, 1834; Nothosaurus muensteri Meyer, 1839 Synonyms of N. yangjuanensis : Nothosaurus rostellatus Shang, 2006

= Nothosaurus =

Nothosaurus Temporal range: 240–210 Ma Middle to Late Triassic

Extinct genus of reptiles

Nothosaurus ('false lizard', from the Ancient Greek νόθος, nothos, 'illegitimate' and σαῦρος, sauros, 'lizard') is an extinct genus of sauropterygian reptile from the Triassic period, approximately 245–228 million years ago, with fossils being distributed throughout the former Tethys Ocean, from North Africa and Europe to China. It is the best known member of the nothosaur order.

== Description ==
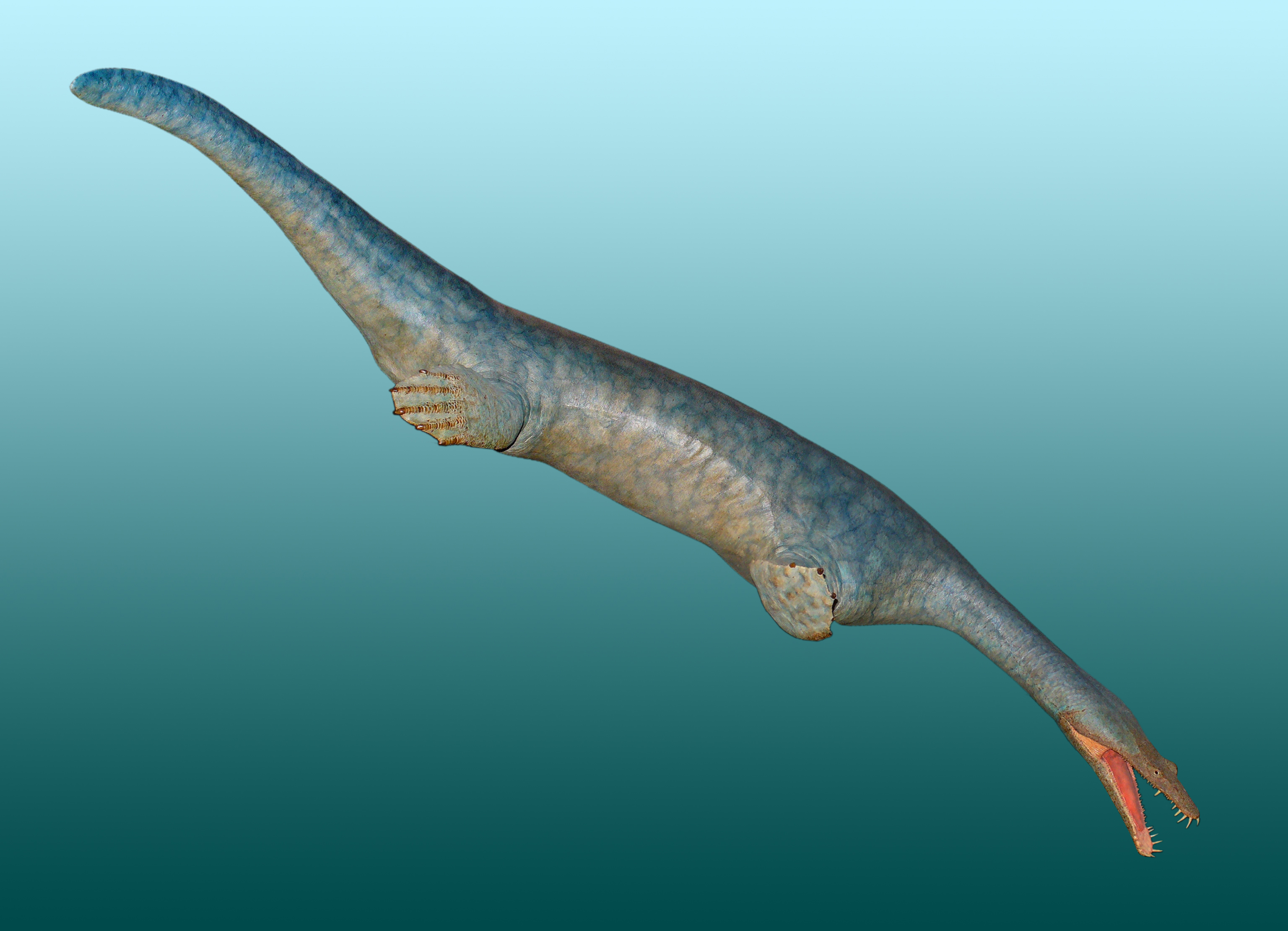
Nothosaurus mirabilis

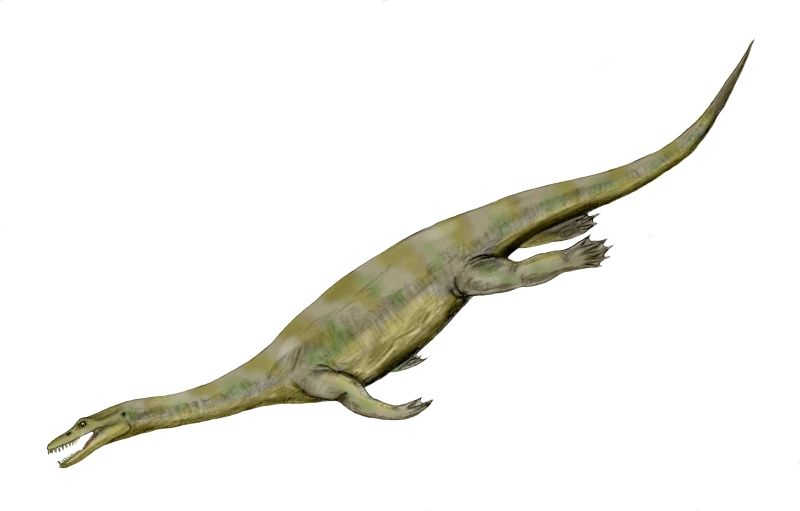
Life restoration

Nothosaurus was a semi-oceanic animal which most likely had a lifestyle similar to that of today's seals. It was about 4 metres (13 ft), with long, webbed toes and possibly a fin on its tail. However, some species such as N. zhangi and N. giganteus were larger, up to 5–7 metres (16–23 ft). When swimming, Nothosaurus would use its tail, legs, and webbed feet to propel and steer it through the water. The skull was broad and flat, with long jaws, lined with needle teeth, it probably caught fish and other marine creatures. Trackways attributed, partly by process of elimination, to a nothosaur that was reported from Yunnan, China in June 2014, were interpreted as the paddle impressions left as the animals dug into soft seabed with rowing motions of their paddles, churning up hidden benthic creatures that they snapped up. Once caught, few animals would be able to shake themselves free from the mouth of Nothosaurus.

Size estimation of N. mirabilis

In many respects its body structure resembled that of the much later plesiosaurs, but it was not as well adapted to an aquatic environment. It is thought that one branch of the nothosaurs may have evolved into pliosaurs such as Liopleurodon, a short-necked plesiosaur that grew up to 6.4 metres (21 ft), and the long-necked Cryptoclidus, a fish eater with a neck as long as 1.3 metres (4.3 ft).

== Species ==
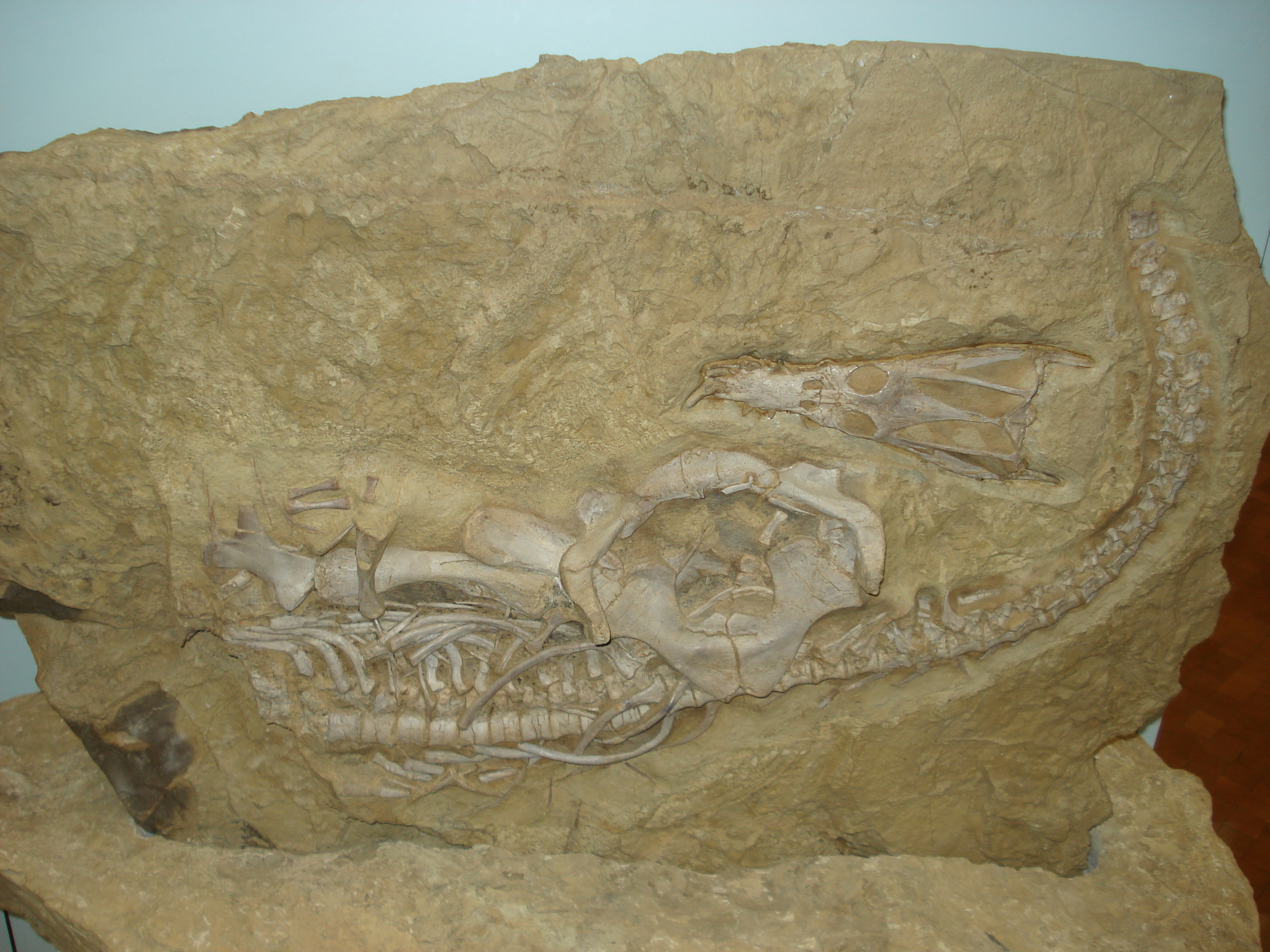
Nothosaurus jagisteus

There are nearly a dozen known species of Nothosaurus. The type species is N. mirabilis, named in 1834 from the Germanic Muschelkalk. Other species include N. giganteus (previously known as Paranothosaurus) from Osnabrück, Germany; N. juvenilis, also from Germany; N. edingerae from the Upper Muschelkalk and Lower Keuper; N. haasi and N. tchernovi from Makhtesh Ramon, Israel; N. cymatosauroides from the Spanish Muschelkalk; N. jagisteus from the Upper Muschelkalk of Hohenlohe, Germany; and N. youngi, N. yangjuanensis (and its junior synonym N. rostellatus) and the recently named N. zhangi from Guizhou, China. Several species have been described from the Lower Muschelkalk in Winterswijk, the Netherlands, including N. marchicus (and its junior synonym N. winterswijkensis) and N. winkelhorsti. Recently, the long considered lost type material of N. schimperi Meyer, 1842 from the Lower Muschelkalk of Soultz-les-Bains, Alsace, France, has been rediscovered and a lectotype has been designated.

Klein and Albers (2009) conducted a phylogenetic analysis, but did not test the monophyly of Nothosaurus, as other nothosaurids were not included in their analysis.

- Nothosaurus
  - - N. edingerae
    - - N. giganteus
      - N. mirabilis
      - - N. haasi
        - N. tchernovi
      - N. jagisteus
    - N. marchicus
    - N. winterswijkensis
    - N. youngi
    - N. yangiuanensis
  - N. juvenilis
  - N. winkelhorsti

Several other species have been named but are now generally considered invalid. One such species, N. procerus, is now considered a junior subjective synonym of N. marchicus. Other species now considered junior synonyms of N. marchicus include N. crassus, N. oldenburgi, N. raabi, N. schroderi, N. venustus and the recently named N. winterswijkensis. Junior synonyms of N. giganteus, the second largest Nothosaurus species, include N. andriani, N. angustifronis, N. aduncidens, N. baruthicus and N. chelydrops.

A species level phylogenetic analysis of Nothosauridae was performed by Liu et al. (2014), and included all known valid species of the family and Nothosaurus apart from Lariosaurus stensioi (type of Micronothosaurus), Nothosaurus cymatosauroides, and Ceresiosaurus lanzi. Due to the inclusion of other nothosaurids other than Nothosaurus, the monophyly of Nothosaurus was tested for the first time. The analysis found both Lariosaurus and Nothosaurus to be polyphyletic in regard to each other and all the other genera of the family, making a systematic revision of these two genera necessary. Below, their results are shown with type species of named nothosaurid genera noted. Later, in 2017, the species N. juvenilis, N. youngi, and N. winkelhorsti were formally moved to Lariosaurus.

- - Pachypleurosauria
  - Nothosauria
    - Simosaurus gaillardoti
    - Nothosauridae
      - Germanosaurus latissimus (type of Germanosaurus)
      - N. zhangi
      - N. haasi
      - N. edingerae
      - - - N. jagisteus
          - - N. mirabilis (type of Nothosaurus)
            - N. tchernovi
        - - - N. marchicus
            - N. yangiuanensis
          - - N. giganteus
            - - N. juvenilis
              - - Lariosaurus hongguoensis
                - - - Lariosaurus buzzii (type of Silvestrosaurus)
                    - N. winkelhorsti
                  - - - Lariosaurus xingyiensis
                      - N. youngi
                    - - - Lariosaurus calcagnii (type of Ceresiosaurus)
                        - Lariosaurus valceresii
                      - - Lariosaurus balsami (type of Lariosaurus)
                        - Lariosaurus curionii

== Palaeobiology ==
=== Life history ===
Nothosaurus had a high degree of developmental plasticity. Seven specimens in a studied sample of twenty-four Nothosaurus showed evidence of vivipary. Vivipary may have been an adaptation for increasing survival early in an individual's life history to compensate for high mortality ates at later life stages.

== General references ==
- Dixon, Dougal (2006). The Complete Book of Dinosaurs. Hermes House.
- Haines, Tim, and Paul Chambers. The Complete Guide to Prehistoric Life. Pg. 64. Canada: Firefly Books Ltd., 2006
