= Paludidraco =

Paludidraco Temporal range: Late Triassic, Carnian–Norian

Scientific classification
- Kingdom: Animalia
- Phylum: Chordata
- Class: Reptilia
- Superorder: †Sauropterygia
- Order: †Nothosauroidea
- Suborder: †Nothosauria
- Family: †Simosauridae
- Genus: †Paludidraco de Miguel Chaves et al., 2018
- Species: †P. multidentatus

Binomial name
- †Paludidraco multidentatus de Miguel Chaves et al., 2018

Extinct species of reptile

Paludidraco is a nothosaur belonging to the Simosauridae from the Late Triassic of Spain. It includes one species, Paludidraco multidentatus. Paludidraco is thought to possibly have been a filter-feeding marine reptile, and was about 2.5 metres (8.2 ft) long. The holotype, MUPA-ATZ0101, consists of one relatively complete skull and partial postcranial skeleton and one partial skull and mandibles, were found in the El Atance site in Guadalajara, Central Spain at the Keuper Facies horizon, the border of the Carnian and Norian periods of the Triassic.

== Description ==
Paludidraco was similar to its close relatives Simosaurus, but differed in several important respects. The teeth were pleurodont and it had more than 15 premaxillary teeth, hence the species name multidentatus meaning 'many-toothed'. It had a relatively long snout, but the nostrils were higher up on its head than those of Simosaurus. The upper temporal fenestra is narrow, and the pineal foramen is highly elongated. The supraoccipital is horizontally sutured with the parietal and exposed at the posterior end of the parietal table. The jaws are very slender and fragile, quite bowed, and with the teeth situated laterally. There are very many teeth, all small, recurved and flattened sideways. The vertebral centra are amphicoelous and the zygapophyses are pachyostotic. The ribs are pachyostotic and strongly distally expanded.

== Palaeoecology ==
Paludidraco, like all nothosaurs, would have been mainly aquatic but able to come on land for short periods. It would not have been able to capture live prey, as its jaws were too fragile except for very small animals which could offer no resistance, and its robust pachyostotic postcranial skeleton would have made it unmanoeuvrable. Its many small teeth create a comb-like structure which would be suitable for filter-feeding, and its bowed jaws could have taken in large volumes of water for filtering, but it did not have an especially elongated rostrum or very large jaws, as modern baleen whales do, suggesting that it would have been unable to 'suspension feed' in midwater with shoals of crustaceans or plankton.

Paludidraco's small teeth and weak jaws would probably have also been inadequate for eating many marine plants, but it might have been able to scrape off soft vegetable matter from plants on the sea floor. The pachyostotic skeleton, similar to that seen in modern sirenians, would have made Paludidraco slow and unmanoeuvrable, but would have given it neutral buoyancy and so enabled it to hover near the sea floor while expending very little energy. It has therefore been proposed that Paludidraco swam slowly along the seabed, or possibly even walked along it, eating soft vegetable matter. Alternatively, it could have taken mouthfuls of silt or sand from the seabed and shaken its head from side to side to filter out the small crustaceans or worms living in the sediment, in a similar way to modern grey whales. This would explain its apparent ability to filter but not to 'suspension feed', while the pachyostotic skeleton would have made this a very low-energy lifestyle. It is also possible that it could have eaten both vegetable and animal matter in the ways proposed.
