= Germanosaurus =

Germanosaurus Temporal range: Middle Triassic, 247 Ma

Scientific classification
- Domain: Eukaryota
- Kingdom: Animalia
- Phylum: Chordata
- Class: Reptilia
- Superorder: †Sauropterygia
- Order: †Nothosauroidea
- Family: †Nothosauridae
- Genus: †Germanosaurus; Nopcsa, 1928

Type species
- †Germanosaurus latissimus (Gürich, 1891)

Species
- †G. latissimus (Gürich, 1891 [originally Nothosaurus]) (nomen dubium) (type); †G. schafferi (Arthaber, 1924 [originally Eurysaurus])

Synonyms
- Genus synonymy: Eurysaurus Frech, 1903 (preoccupied); Species synonymy: Nothosaurus latissimus Gürich, 1891; Cymatosaurus latissimus (Gürich, 1891); Eurysaurus latissimus (Gürich, 1891); Eurysaurus schafferi Arthaber, 1924; Cymatosaurus schafferi (Arthaber, 1924)

Genus of Mesozoic aquatic reptiles

Germanosaurus, meaning "German lizard", is an extinct aquatic genus of nothosaurid sauropterygian known from the early Middle Triassic (early Anisian stage) Lower Muschelkalk of what was known as Upper Silesia, now a part of Poland. The type species of Germanosaurus is G. latissimus, originally named as a species of Nothosaurus. After a new generic name was erected for it, the holotype fragmentary skull was lost, possibly during World War II. Rieppel (1997) thus considered the species to be a nomen dubium in the species. However, from surviving illustrations and descriptions of the material, he concluded that another taxon known as Cymatosaurus schafferi, is referable to Germanosaurus and possibly even represents the same species as G. latissimus. Rieppel removed the species from Cymatosaurus and created the new combination G. schafferi, making it the only valid species of Germanosaurus diagnosable to the species level.

All known material of G. schafferi, including the holotype skull, were collected from the same general locality as the holotype skull of G. latissimus, at Sacrau (now Zakrzów), near Gogolin, Górny Śląsk (Upper Silesia) of Poland. These deposits belong to the lower part of the Gogolin Formation, which is a basal part of the Lower Muschelkalk, dating to the early Anisian stage of the early Middle Triassic, about 247 million years ago.
