= Eurysaurus =

Eurysaurus Temporal range: Early Jurassic, 195–185 Ma

Scientific classification
- Domain: Eukaryota
- Kingdom: Animalia
- Phylum: Chordata
- Class: Reptilia
- Superorder: †Sauropterygia
- Order: †Plesiosauria
- Suborder: †Pliosauroidea
- Genus: †Eurysaurus; Gaudry, 1878

Type species
- †Eurysaurus raincourti Gaudry, 1878

Extinct genus of reptiles

Eurysaurus (meaning "wide lizard") is an extinct genus of plesiosaur, originally classed as a nothosaur, from the Early Jurassic of Echenoz-la-Meline, France, named in 1878. The type material, consisting of a cranium, teeth and five vertebrae, is now lost. The type species is E. raincourti, and a second species, E. schafferi, was named in 1924 but it has since been absorbed into the unrelated genus Germanosaurus.

== History ==
The holotype, first described in 1878 by Albert Gaudry, has since been lost. A new study based essentially on illustrations of the type material by Noè (2001) has considered Eurysaurus a nomen dubium, probably congeneric with the pliosaur Simolestes. However, due to the stratigraphic difference of the two forms, it is possible that Eurysaurus was a separate genus in its own right.

== Classification ==
Gaudry in 1878 originally classified Eurysaurus as a nothosaur. In 2001, Noè reclassified Eurysaurus as a plesiosaur, possibly belonging to the Pliosauroidea.

== See also ==
- Timeline of plesiosaur research
- List of plesiosaurs
