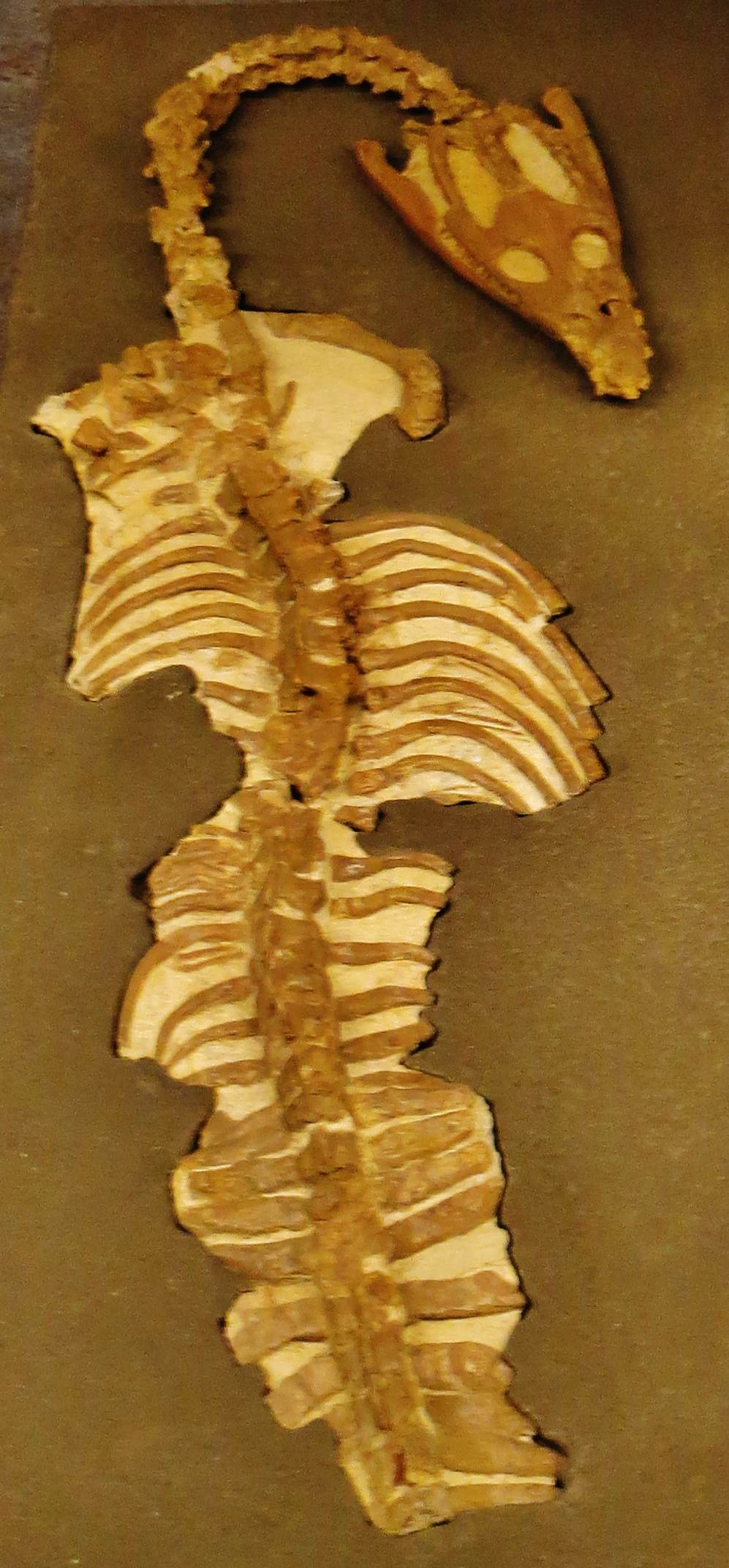
- Nothosaurus mirabilis fossil

Scientific classification
- Kingdom: Animalia
- Phylum: Chordata
- Superorder: †Sauropterygia
- Order: †Nothosauroidea
- Suborder: †Nothosauria
- Family: †Nothosauridae; Seeley, 1889

Genera
- †Carinthiasaurus; †Germanosaurus; †Metanothosaurus (nomen dubium); †Proneusticosaurus (nomen dubium); †Lariosaurinae; †Ceresiosaurus; †Lariosaurus; †Silvestrosaurus; †Nothosaurinae; †Nothosaurus (type)

= Nothosauridae =

Nothosauridae Temporal range: Anisian-Norian, 247.2–210 Ma Possible late Rhaetian record.

Extinct family of reptiles

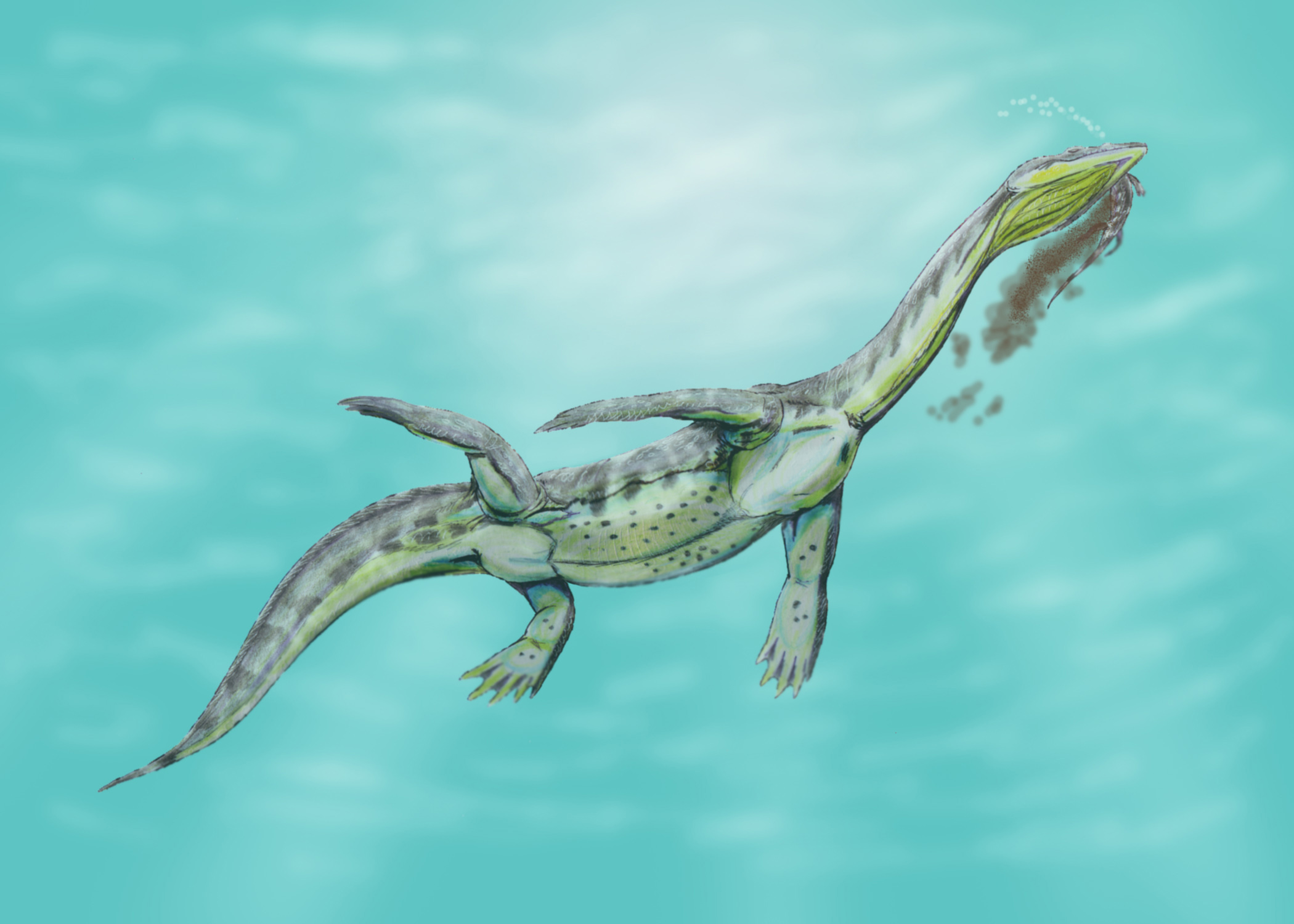
An impression of Ceresiosaurus eating a small aquatic animal

Nothosauridae are an extinct family of carnivorous aquatic sauropterygian reptiles from the Triassic time period of China, France, Germany, Israel, Italy, Netherlands, Russia, Switzerland, and northern Africa.

== Phylogeny ==
The cladogram shown below follows Rieppel (1998)'s phylogenetic analysis of nothosaurids (bold terminal taxa contain living species). Most of these relations are still considered correct today, but despite Rieppel (1998)'s referral of Ceresiosaurus and Silvestrosaurus to Lariosaurus, some authors still consider them separate and many additional species have been named since this analysis.

- - Archosauromorpha
    - - Prolacertiformes
      - Choristodera
    - - Rhynchosauria
      - Trilophosaurus
    - Archosauriformes
  - - Lepidosauromorpha
      - Kuehneosauridae
      - Lepidosauria
    - - Testudines
      - - Placodontia
        - - Pistosauroidea
            - Corosaurus
            - - Cymatosaurus
              - Pistosaurus
          - Nothosauroidea
            - Pachypleurosauria
              - Dactylosaurus
              - Neusticosaurus-Serpianosaurus
            - Nothosauria
              - Simosaurus
              - Nothosauridae
                - Germanosaurus
                - - Nothosaurus
                  - - - Lariosaurus balsami (type species of Lariosaurus)
                      - Lariosaurus curionii
                    - - Ceresiosaurus
                      - - Silvestrosaurus
                        - Lariosaurus valceresii

A species level phylogenetic analysis of Nothosauridae was performed by Liu et al. (2014), and included all known valid species of the family apart from Lariosaurus stensioi (type of Micronothosaurus), Nothosaurus cymatosauroides, and Ceresiosaurus lanzi. The resultant topology is similar to the one obtained in Rieppel (1998) if the new additions are ignored, however this analysis found both Lariosaurus and Nothosaurus to be polyphyletic in regard to each-other and all other genera of the family, making a systematic revision of these two genera necessary. Below, their results are shown with type species of named nothosaurid genera noted.

- - Pachypleurosauria
  - Nothosauria
    - Simosaurus gaillardoti
    - Nothosauridae
      - Germanosaurus latissimus (type of Germanosaurus)
      - Nothosaurus zhangi
      - Nothosaurus haasi
      - Nothosaurus edingerae
      - - - Nothosaurus jagisteus
          - - Nothosaurus mirabilis (type of Nothosaurus)
            - Nothosaurus tchemovi
        - - - Nothosaurus marchicus
            - Nothosaurus yangiuanensis
          - - Nothosaurus giganteus
            - - Nothosaurus juvenilis
              - - Lariosaurus hongguoensis
                - - - Lariosaurus buzzii (type of Silvestrosaurus)
                    - Nothosaurus winkelhorsti
                  - - - Lariosaurus xingyiensis
                      - Nothosaurus youngi
                    - - - Lariosaurus calcagnii (type of Ceresiosaurus)
                        - Lariosaurus valceresii
                      - - Lariosaurus balsami (type of Lariosaurus)
                        - Lariosaurus curionii

== See also ==
- Nothosauria
- Pachypleurosauria
