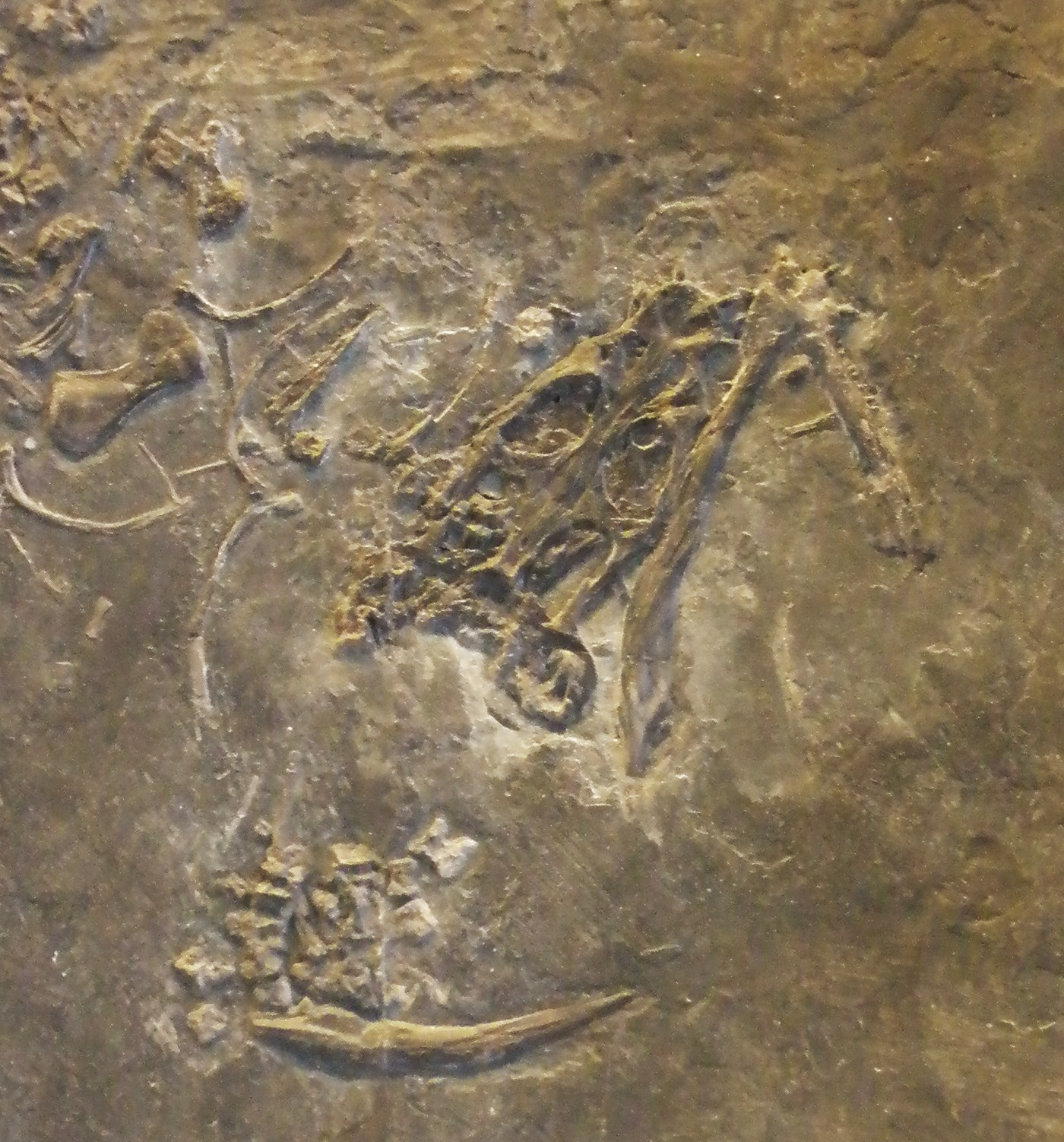
- Silvestrosaurus buzzii (= ? Lariosaurus buzzii) fossil, Paleontology Museum of Zurich

Scientific classification
- Kingdom: Animalia
- Phylum: Chordata
- Class: Reptilia
- Superorder: †Sauropterygia
- Order: †Nothosauroidea
- Suborder: †Nothosauria
- Family: †Nothosauridae
- Subfamily: †Lariosaurinae
- Genus: †Silvestrosaurus; Kuhn-Schnyner, 1990

Type species
- †Silvestrosaurus buzzii [originally Lariosaurus] Tschanz, 1989

= Silvestrosaurus =

Silvestrosaurus Temporal range: Middle Triassic, 242 Ma

Extinct genus of reptiles

Silvestrosaurus is an extinct aquatic genus of lariosaurine nothosaurid sauropterygian known from the Middle Triassic (Anisian-Ladinian boundary) of Monte San Giorgio, southern Switzerland. It contains a single species, Silvestrosaurus buzzii, originally considered to be a species of the closely related Lariosaurus. The species was named by Tschanz in 1989, based solely on the holotype PIMUZ T/2804 comprising the skull, the lower jaw, and a dis-articulated partial postcranial skeleton. Cyamodus hildegardis tooth bearing elements were found in the stomach region of the specimen. The holotype was collected at Punkt 902 of Monte San Giorgio, from layer 97 of the Grenzbitumen zone, dating to the Anisian-Ladinian boundary of the Middle Triassic. Kuhn-Schnyner (1990) reassigned the species to its own genus, creating the combination S. buzzii. The generic name honors a church near the collection locality of the holotype, dedicated to Saint Sylvester, a Pope during the reign of Constantine the Great, and from Greek saurus, meaning "lizard", a common suffix for genus names of extinct reptile.

Rieppel (1998) reassigned S. buzzii back to its original combination Lariosaurus buzzii, together with another lariosaurine genus Ceresiosaurus. Rieppel (1998) found the two species to form a clade with Lariosaurus valceresii, while the other species of Lariosaurus (incl. the type L. balsami) formed a second clade, a sister taxon to the first. In 2004, however, this synonymy was objected by Hänni who described and named a second species for Ceresiosaurus, and by several other authors since.

== Features ==
Silvestrosaurus is very similar to its close relative Lariosaurus (see above) but there are enough differences for most people to assign them to different genera. The nasal has no contact with the prefrontal, separated by processes of the frontal and maxilla, and many parts of the skull, such as the parietal and postfrontal bones, are much broader and flatter than in Lariosaurus. The clavicles do not meet in an anteromedial suture, unlike in Lariosaurus. In Silvestrosaurus the radius is slightly longer than the ulna, but in Lariosaurus they are the same length or the radius is shorter. As the back half of the skeleton is missing, we cannot compare the number of vertebrae. Nor can we compare the hindfeet to see if Silvestrosaurus had paddles like Ceresiosaurus rather than individual toes like Lariosaurus. However, the front limbs definitely had paddles. Silvestrosaurus was only around 0.6–0.7 m (2.0–2.3 ft) long as an adult, making it relatively small for a nothosaur. Larger specimens would have belonged to individuals measuring 1–1.2 m (3.3–3.9 ft) long.
