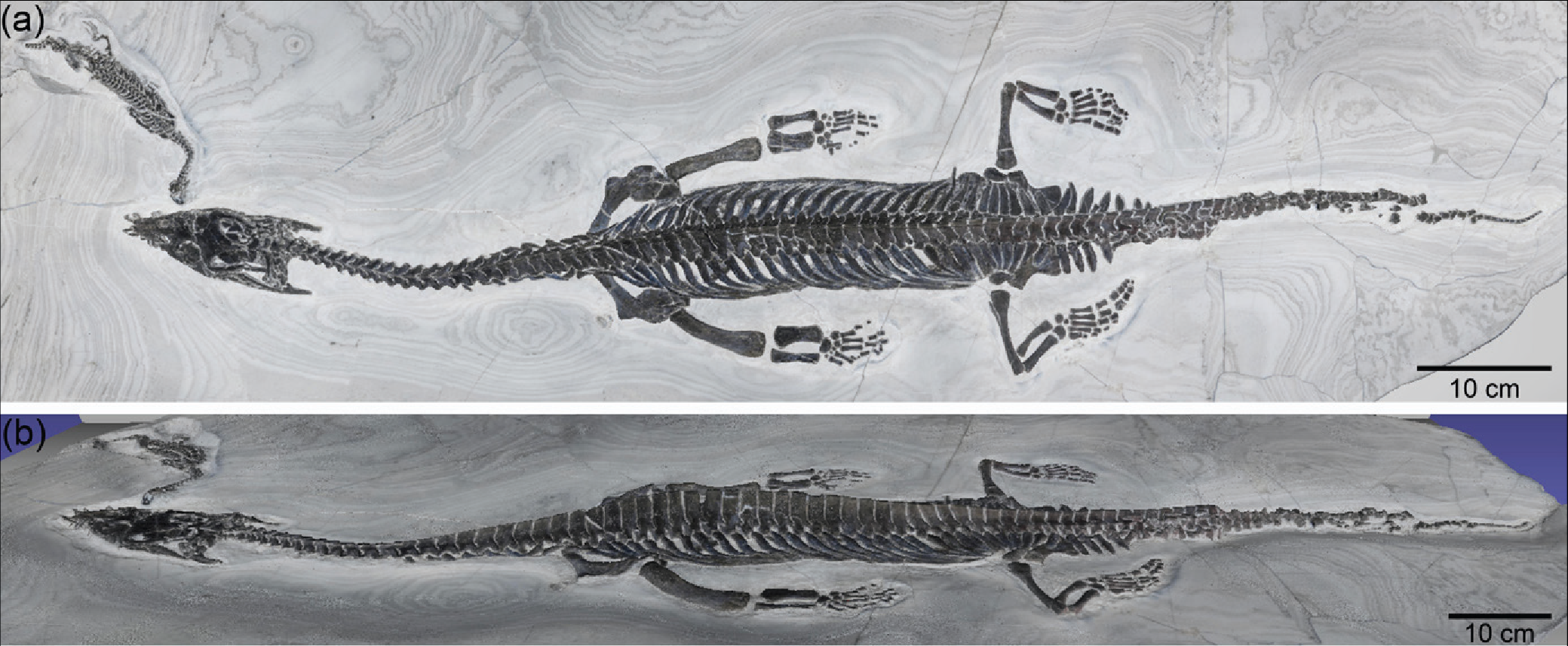
- Holotype specimen in dorsal (a) and dorsolateral (b) views

Scientific classification
- Kingdom: Animalia
- Phylum: Chordata
- Class: Reptilia
- Superorder: †Sauropterygia
- Order: †Nothosauroidea
- Suborder: †Nothosauria
- Family: †Nothosauridae
- Genus: †Carinthiasaurus; Klein et al., 2025
- Species: †C. kandutschi

Binomial name
- †Carinthiasaurus kandutschi Klein et al., 2025

= Carinthiasaurus =

Carinthiasaurus Temporal range: Middle Triassic, Ladinian

Genus of extinct reptile

Carinthiasaurus (meaning "Carinthia lizard") is an extinct genus of nothosaurid sauropterygian, part of a group of marine reptiles. It is known from the Middle Triassic (Ladinian age) Fellbach Limestone of Austria. The genus contains a single species, Carinthiasaurus kandutschi, known from two nearly complete skeletons, one of which preserves a skull.

== Discovery and naming ==
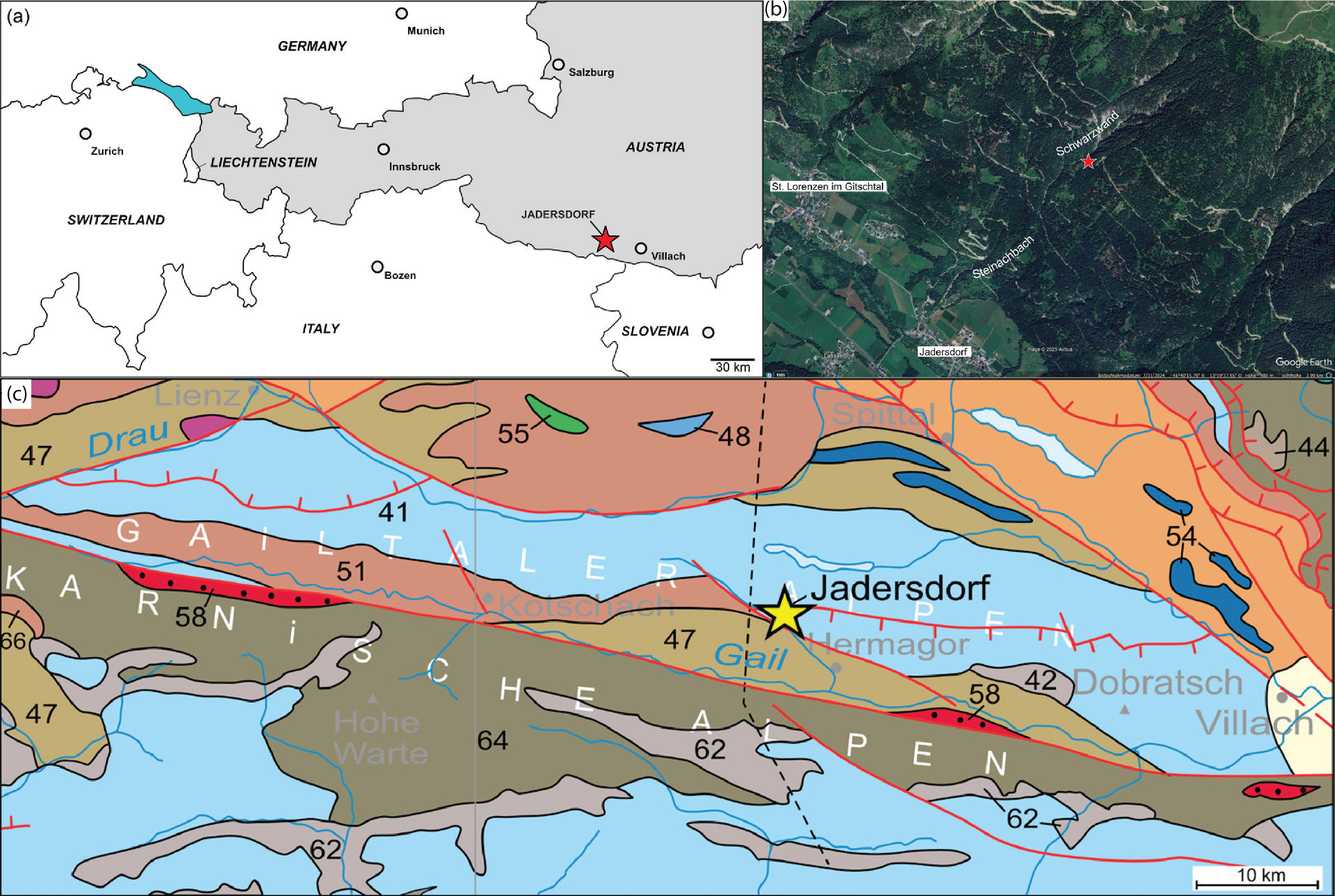
Carinthiasaurus type locality

The Carinthiasaurus fossil material was discovered in the 'Schwarzwandgraben' locality' of the Fellbach Limestone (for which the name "Fellbach Formation" has also been proposed) in the Gailtal Alps near the village of Jadersdorf in Carinthia, Austria. Two Carinthiasaurus specimens are known, both accessioned at the museum Kärntens versteinerte Welten. Nockalm 7030n was the first to be found and collected, in 2018. It is a partial skeleton missing the skull and the first several cervical vertebrae. A second specimen, Nockalm 7030v, was found and collected later in 2022, comprising a fully articulated and almost complete skeleton including the skull. An articulated complete skeleton of a small undescribed pachypleurosaur is preserved near the head of this specimen. Both Nockalm 7030v and 7030n are preserved in dorsal (seen from the top) view.

In 2025, Nicole Klein and colleagues described Carinthiasaurus kandutschi as a new genus and species of nothosaurids based on these fossil remains. They established the more complete Nockalm 7030v as the holotype specimen. The generic name, Carinthiasaurus, combines a reference to the discovery of the specimen in Carinthia, Austria, with the Ancient Greek σαῦρος (sauros), meaning "lizard". The specific name, kandutschi, honors Georg Kandutsch, who was involved in the excavation and preparation of both specimens.

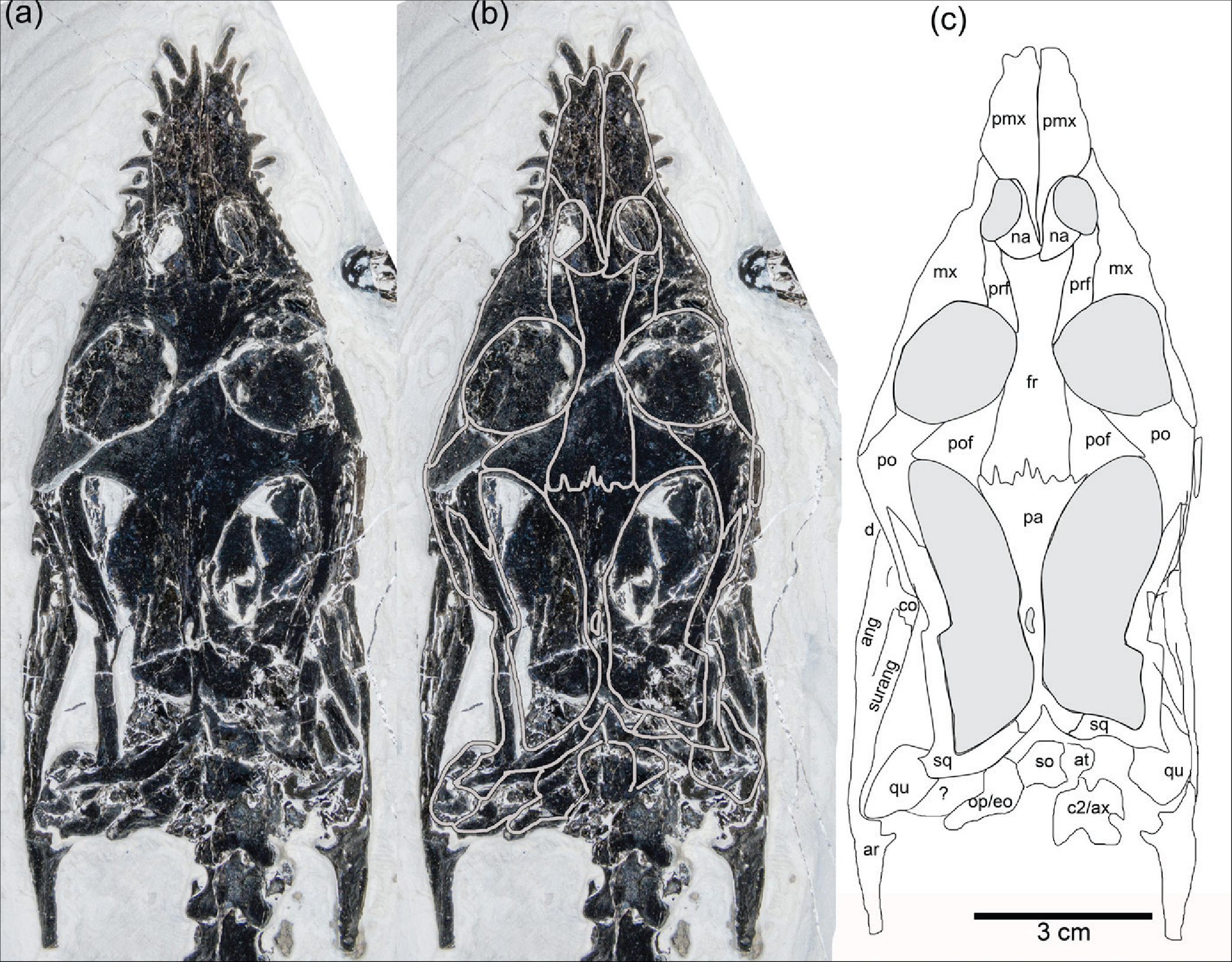
Holotype skull

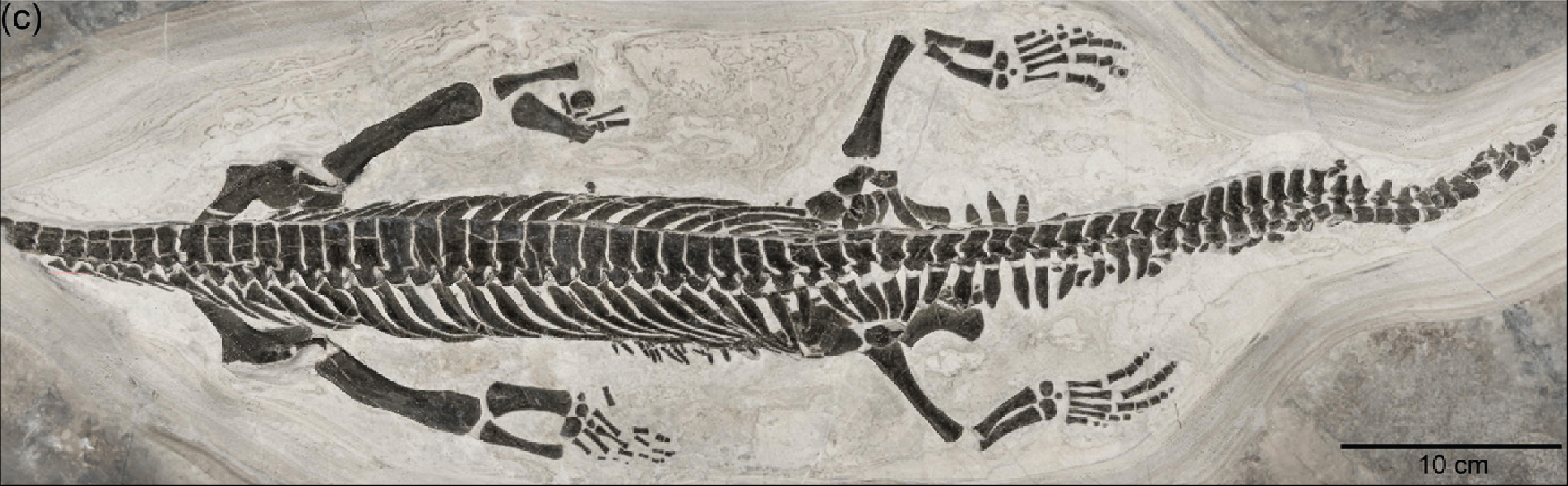
Referred specimen
