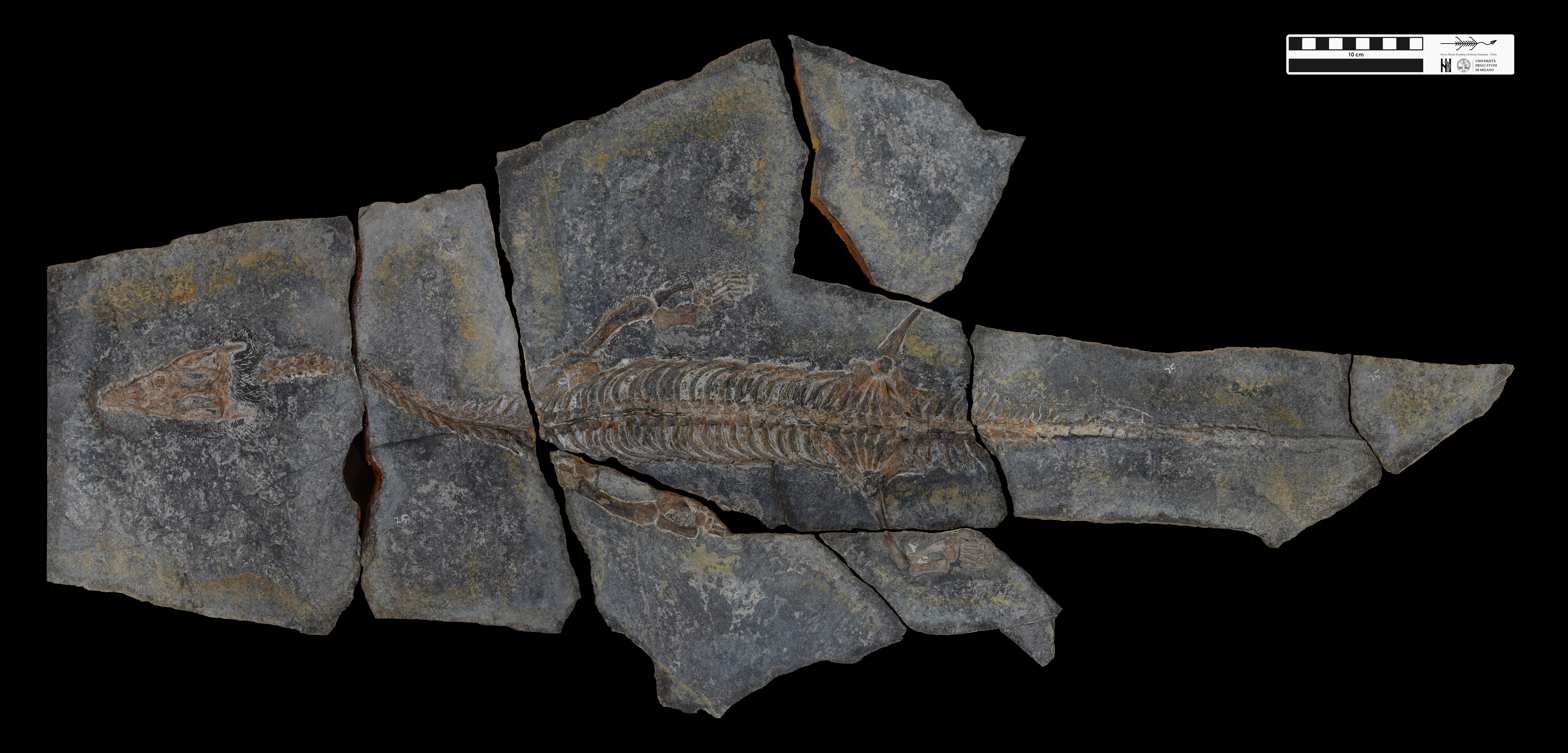
- Lariosaurus valceresii

Scientific classification
- Kingdom: Animalia
- Phylum: Chordata
- Class: Reptilia
- Superorder: †Sauropterygia
- Order: †Nothosauroidea
- Suborder: †Nothosauria
- Family: †Nothosauridae
- Subfamily: †Lariosaurinae
- Genus: †Lariosaurus; Curioni, 1847

Species
- †L. balsami Curioni, 1847 (type); †L. buzzii? Tschanz, 1989; †L. curionii Rieppel, 1998; †L. hongguoensis Jiang et al., 2006; †L. juvenilis Edinger, 1921; †L. stensioi (Haas, 1963) Rieppel, Mazin & Tchernov, 1999; †L. valceresii Tintori & Renesto, 1990; †L. vosseveldensis Klein et al., 2016; †L. winkelhorsti Klein & Albers, 2004; †L. xingyiensis Li, Liu & Rieppel, 2002; †L. youngi Li & Rieppel, 2004

Synonyms
- Genus synonymy: Deirosaurus Owen, 1854 (nomen dubium); Eupodosaurus Boulenger, 1891; Macromerosaurus Curioni, 1847 emend. Curioni, 1854; Phygosaurus Arthaber, 1924; Rhaticonia Broili, 1927; Micronothosaurus Haas, 1963; Species synonymy: Micronothosaurus stensioi Haas, 1963; Nothosaurus juvenilis Edinger, 1921; Nothosaurus youngi Li & Rieppel, 2004; Nothosaurus winkelhorsti Klein & Albers, 2004 Synonyms of L. balsami: Deirosaurus italicus Owen, 1854 (nomen dubium); Eupodosaurus longobardicus Boulenger, 1891; Lariosaurus lavizzarii Kuhn-Schynder, 1987 (nomen dubium); Macromerosaurus plinii Curioni, 1847 emend. Curioni, 1854; Phygosaurus balsami Arthaber, 1924 (not Curioni, 1847); Proneusticosaurus carinthiacus Arthaber, 1924; Rhaticonia rothpletzi Broili, 1927

= Lariosaurus =

Lariosaurus Temporal range: Anisian-Carnian, 247.2–235 Ma

Extinct genus of reptiles

Lariosaurus is an extinct genus of nothosaurid from the Middle Triassic (late Anisian to late Ladinian stage) of central and western Europe and China. With a complete specimen of L. xingyiensis measuring 70.5 cm (2.3 ft) long and L. hongguoensis possibly measuring up to 80 cm (2.6 ft) long, it was one of the smallest known nothosaurs. First discovered at Perledo on the Lake Como in 1830, it was named in 1847 by Curioni, its name meaning "Lizard from Larius", the ancient name of the lake. This makes it one of the earliest studied reptiles from the Alps. It is known from an almost complete skeleton holotype and several other fairly complete fossils.

The nothosaur Eupodosaurus, initially classified as a stegosaurian dinosaur, is now considered synonymous with Lariosaurus. In 1998 Rieppel synonymised Lariosaurus, Silvestrosaurus and Ceresiosaurus, but this is disputed by many authors and they are usually considered close relatives.

== Features ==
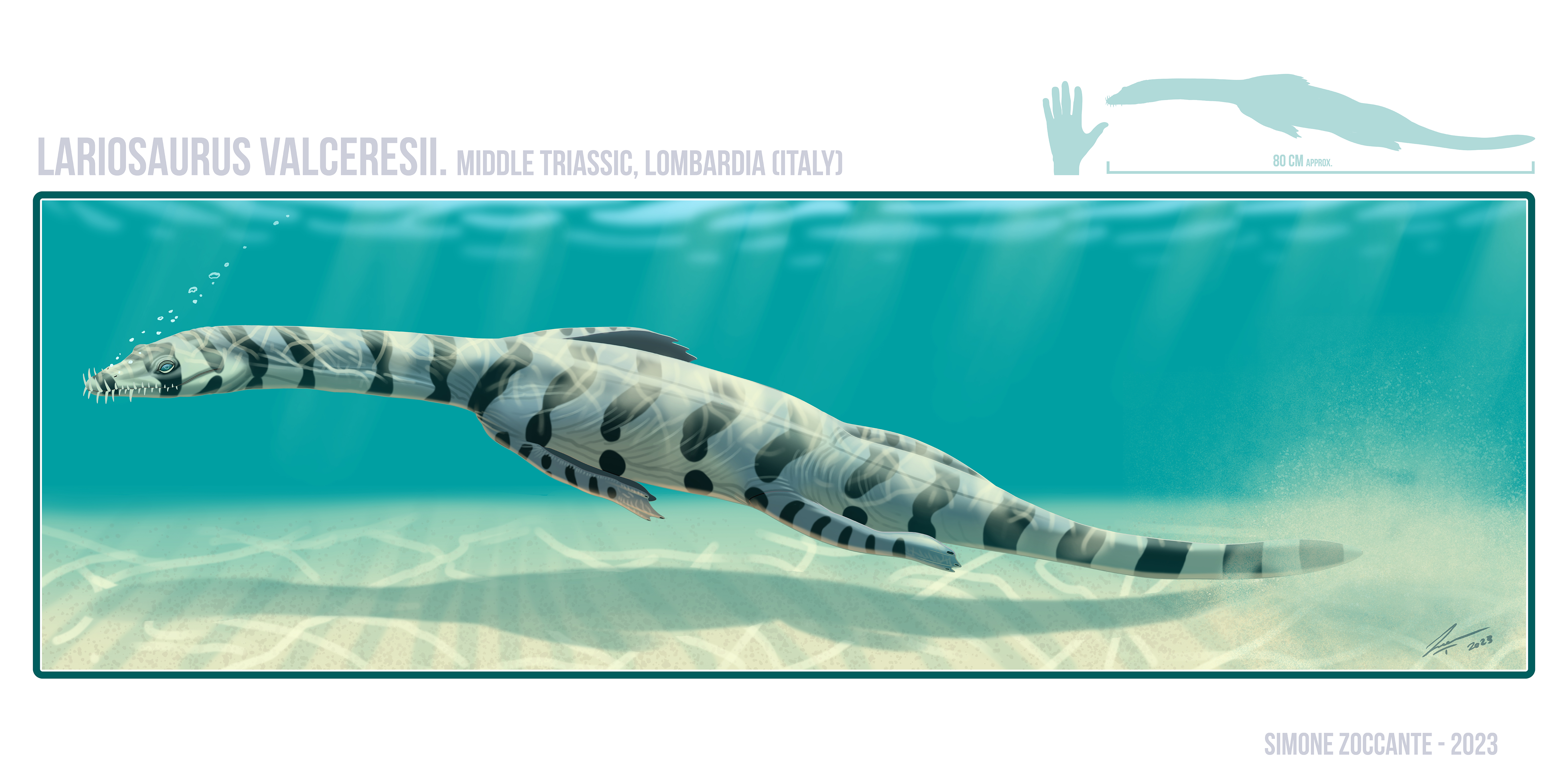
Lariosaurus valceresii life restoration in environment

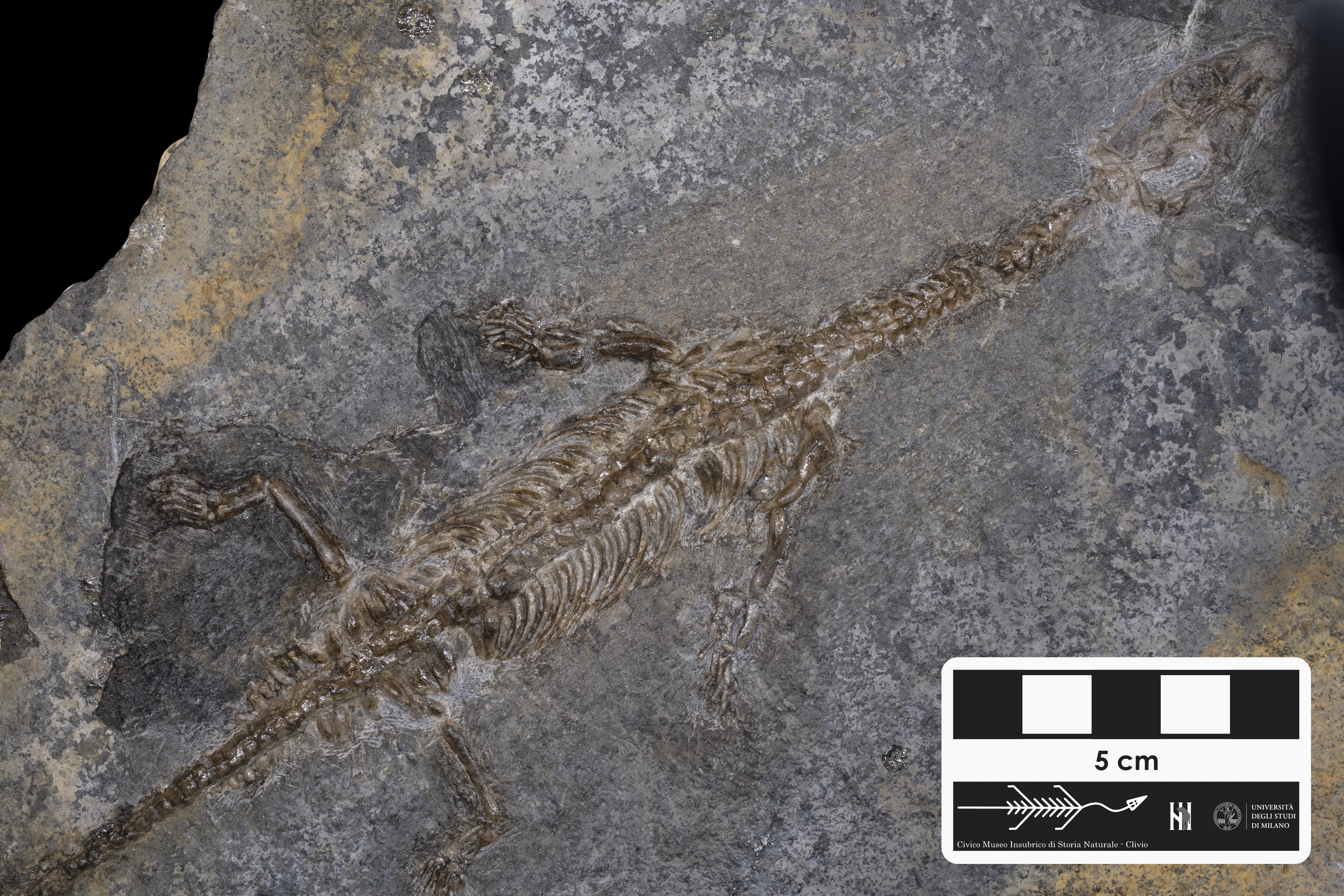
Juvenile of Lariosaurus valceresii

For a nothosaur, Lariosaurus was primitive, possessing a short neck and small flippers in comparison to its relatives. This would have made it a relatively poor swimmer, and it is presumed to have spent much time on dry land, or hunting in shallows. It had a large postorbital region of the skull with the temporal fossae noticeably larger than the orbits. The premaxillary and anterior dentary teeth are strongly elongated, like fangs, and could have acted as a 'fish trap'. The parietal and squamosal bones are elongated into a small occipital crest for the attachment of jaw muscles. The vertebrae are pachyostotic and have a low neural spine. Ribs are present from the neck all the way down to the sacrum, which has a cluster of four or five pairs. There are caudal ribs, but they are very small and not present beyond the 15th caudal vertebra. The gastral ribs are made up of multiple elements and form a sturdy kind of armour. The humerus has a weakly developed deltapectoral crest, and increases gradually in width towards the distal end. There is a distinct space between the radius and the more slender ulna. The fingers have more bones than the toes and clearly show how Lariosaurus was unique among nothosaurs because its front legs were adapted into paddles, while the back legs remained five-toed. The femur is more lightly built than the humerus but longer. There is less difference between tibia and fibula than between radius and ulna. Further, based on skeletal findings of immature lariosaurs inside the adults, Lariosaurus is believed by many to be viviparous, or able to bear live young. Another Lariosaurus skeleton was found with two juvenile placodonts of the genus Cyamodus in its stomach, giving an indication of its diet.

In 2014 a skull was found in the Winterswijk Muschekalk quarry, of what appeared to be a new species, that was named Lariosaurus vosseveldensis. In 2015 it was added to the collection of Museum TwentseWelle in Enschede. It was registered TW.480000504. Also found was an isolated, fused parietal, that was registered TW.4800000505.

== In popular culture ==
Loch Ness mocking "Lariosaurus" sightings are often reported on the newspapers of the Lake Como area. The myth has been cited in various books, songs and TV programmes.
