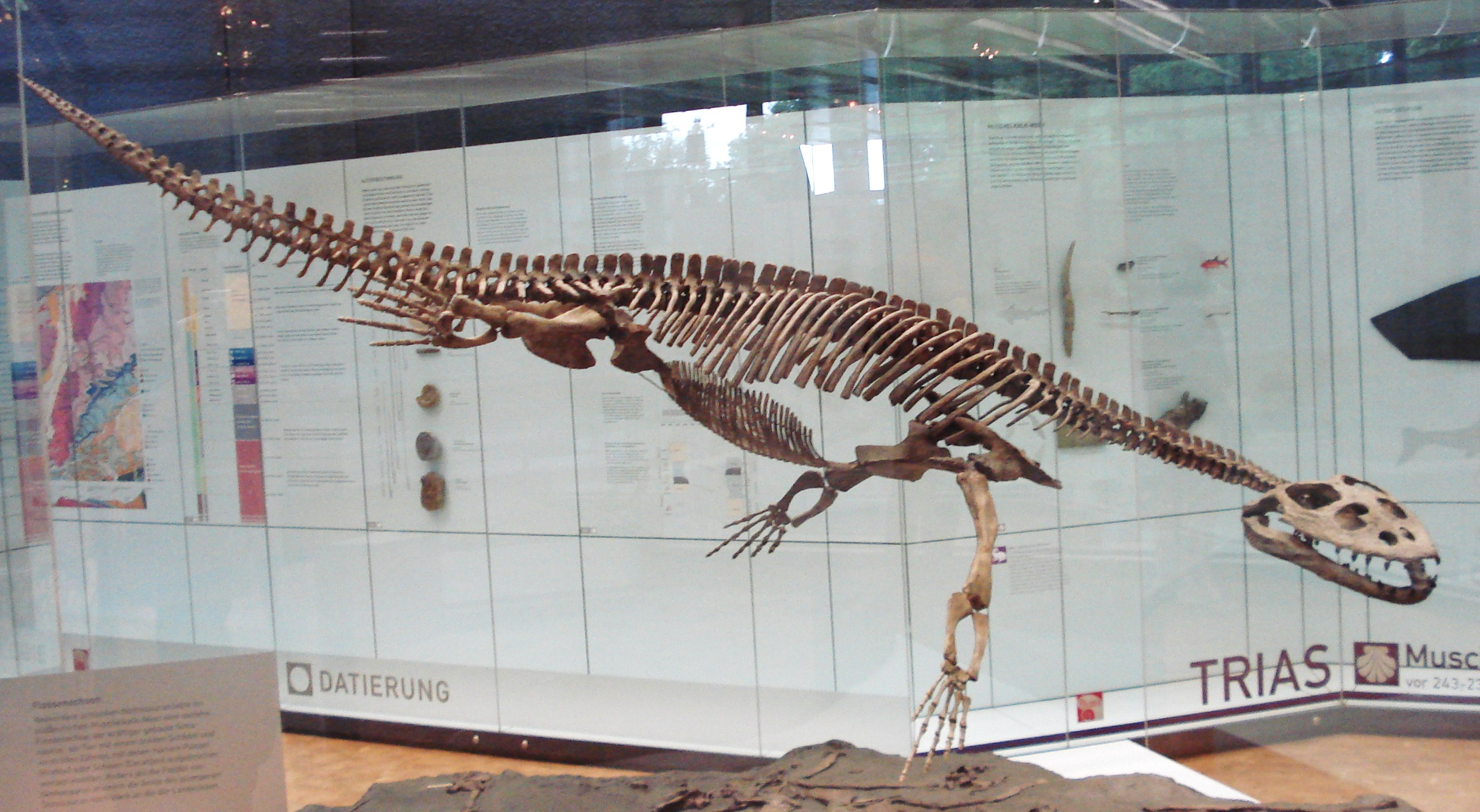
- Mounted skeleton of Simosaurus gaillardoti in the State Museum of Natural History Stuttgart

Scientific classification
- Kingdom: Animalia
- Phylum: Chordata
- Class: Reptilia
- Superorder: †Sauropterygia
- Order: †Nothosauroidea
- Suborder: †Nothosauria
- Family: †Simosauridae; Huene, 1948
- Genus: †Simosaurus; Meyer, 1842

Type species
- †Simosaurus gaillardoti Meyer, 1842

Synonyms
- Nothosaurus mougeoti (Meyer, 1855); Simosaurus guilelmi Meyer, 1842; Simosaurus mougeoti Meyer, 1855

= Simosaurus =

Simosaurus Temporal range: Middle Triassic, 240–230 Ma

Extinct genus of reptiles

Simosaurus is an extinct genus of marine reptile within the superorder Sauropterygia from the Middle Triassic of central Europe. Fossils have been found in deposits in France and Germany that are roughly 230 million years old. It is usually classified as a nothosaur, but has also been considered a pachypleurosaur or a more primitive sauropterygian.

== Description ==
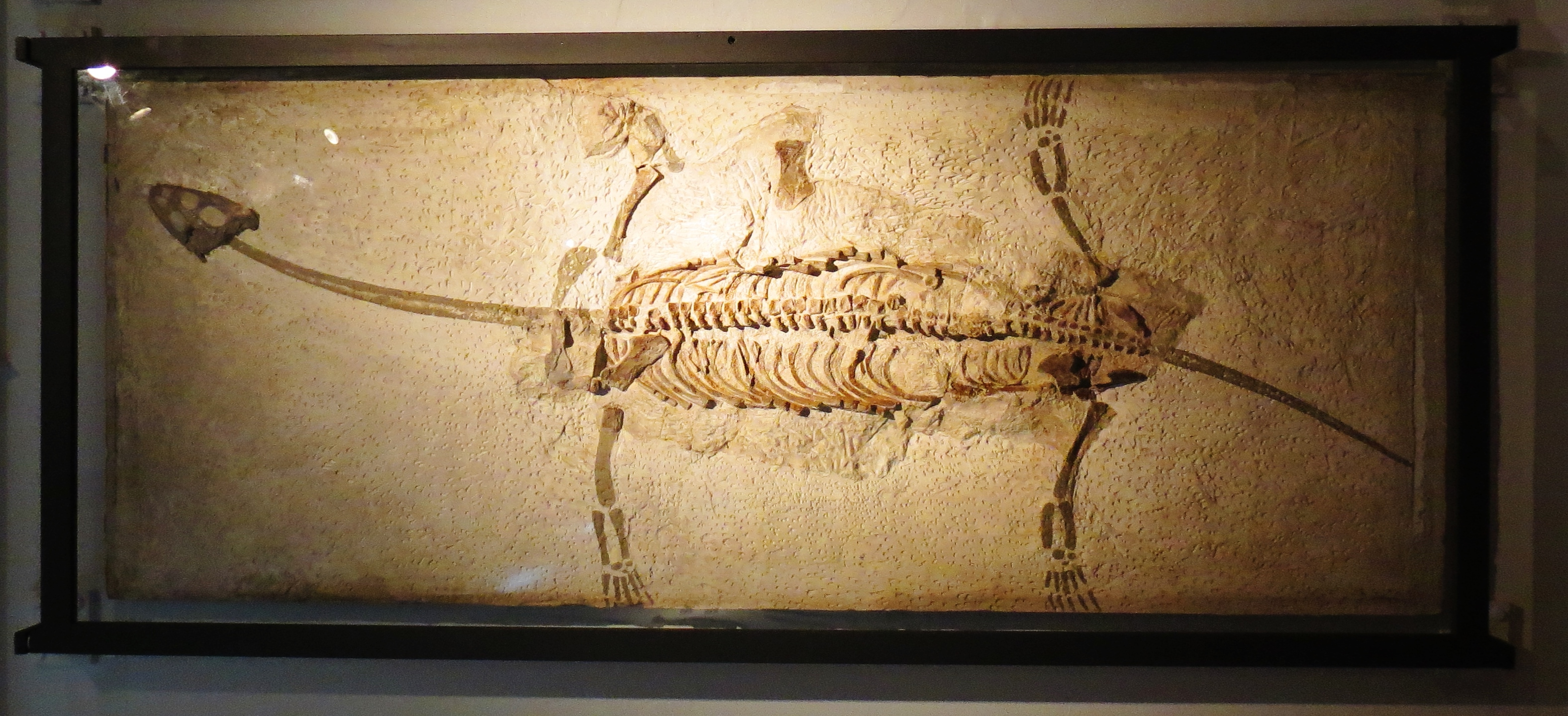
Skeleton

Simosaurus grew from 3 to 4 metres (9.8 to 13.1 ft) in length. It has a blunt, flattened head and large openings behind its eyes called upper temporal fossae. These fossae are larger than the eye sockets but not as big as those of other nothosaurs. Simosaurus also differs from other nothosaurs in that it has blunt teeth that were probably used for crushing hard-shelled organisms. The jaw joint is set far back, projecting beyond the main portion of the skull.

== History ==
The type species of Simosaurus, S. gaillardoti, was named by German paleontologist Christian Erich Hermann von Meyer in 1842. In the same year, von Meyer also named S. mougeoti. He named a third species, S. guilelmi, in 1855. Oscar Fraas named S. pusillus in 1881. A year later, however, it was reassigned to its own genus, Neusticosaurus. S. mougeoti and S. guilelmi have more recently been considered junior synonyms of S. gaillardoti, meaning that they represent the same species.

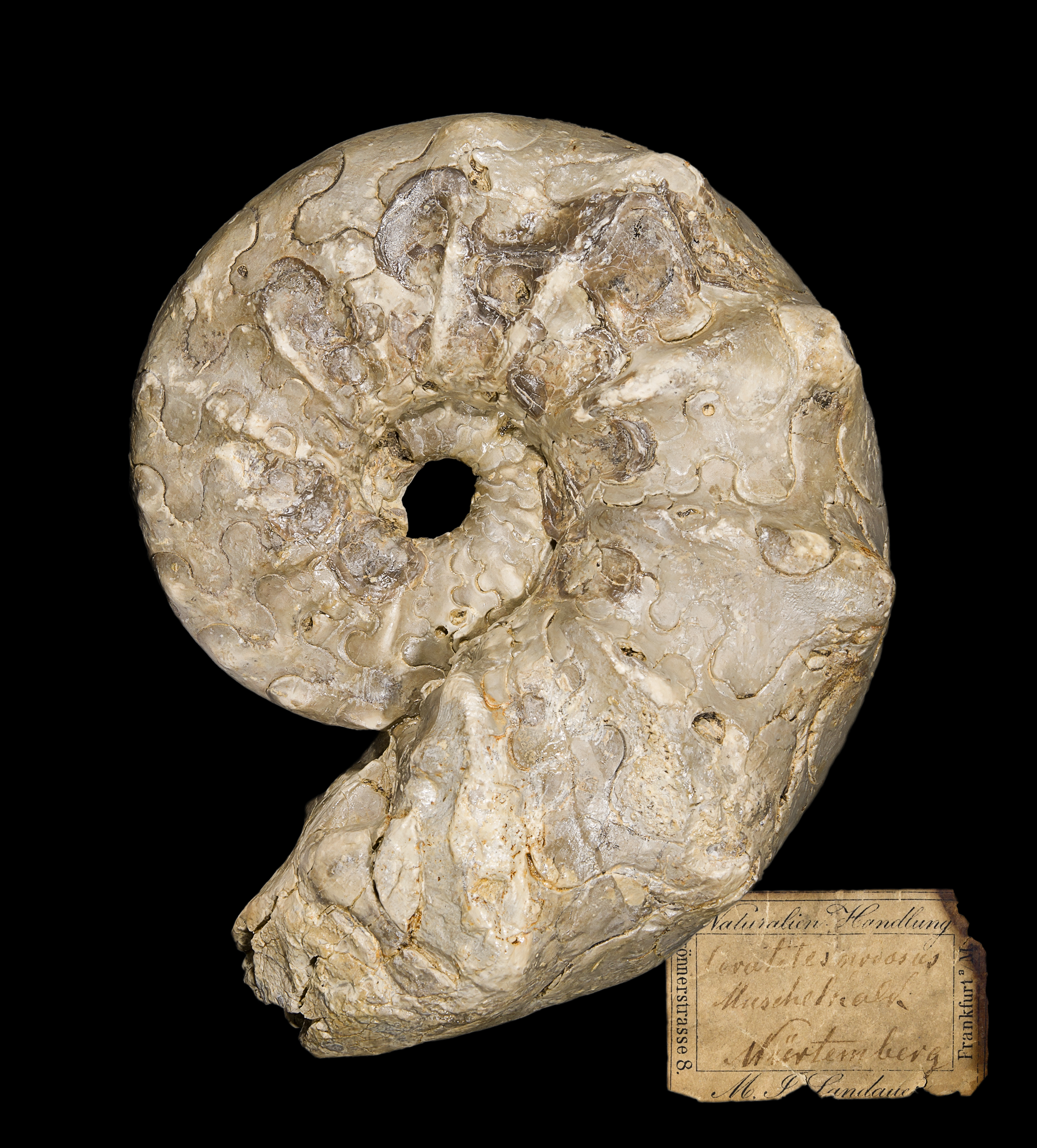
Fossils of the ammonite Ceratites nodosus mark the first presence of Simosaurus in German deposits.

The first fossils of Simosaurus, those described by von Meyer, were found in Lunéville, France. These were found in the upper Muschelkalk, which dates back to the Ladinian stage of the Middle Triassic. Material found in France includes the holotype skull of S. gaillardoti and a partial mandible referred to S. mougeoti. Both were described by von Meyer. The skull, which served as the basis for the first description of Simosaurus, has since been lost. Although initially attributed to Simosaurus, the mandible was labeled as "Nothosaurus mougeoti" in one of von Meyer's later papers.

Additional remains of Simosaurus were found in Franconia and Württemberg in Germany. Duke William of Württemberg discovered a complete skull and sent it to von Meyer in 1842. Von Meyer named S. guilelmi on the basis of this skull, noting that it was smaller and narrower than those of the type species. A complete skeleton first referred to S. guilelmi has been designated the neotype of Simosaurus. Some German fossils have been found in the stratigrafically younger Keuper deposits, but are very rare. Simosaurus is present in biozones of the Muschelkalk that are distinguished by different ammonite fauna. Simosaurus first appears in the nodosus biozone, where fossils of the ammonite Ceratites nodosus are abundant. Specimens becomescommon in the slightly younger dorsoplanus biozone, characterized by the ammonite Ceratites dorsoplanus.

== Paleobiology ==
=== Movement ===
Simosaurus has well-developed vertebrae and a dorsoventrally flattened trunk that would have inhibited side-to-side movement. This movement, called lateral undulation, is seen in most other nothosaurs, including Nothosaurus. The humerus has well-developed crests and the underside of the pectoral girdle is large, suggesting that the forelimbs had a powerful downstroke and provided most of the thrust required for swimming. The scapula is relatively small for a reptile that swims with its limbs, indicating that the upstroke of Simosaurus was weak. Simosaurus was probably a moderately powerful swimmer with a locomotion that was transitional between the lateral undulation of early sauropterygians and the strong flipper-driven swimming of plesiosaurs.

=== Feeding ===
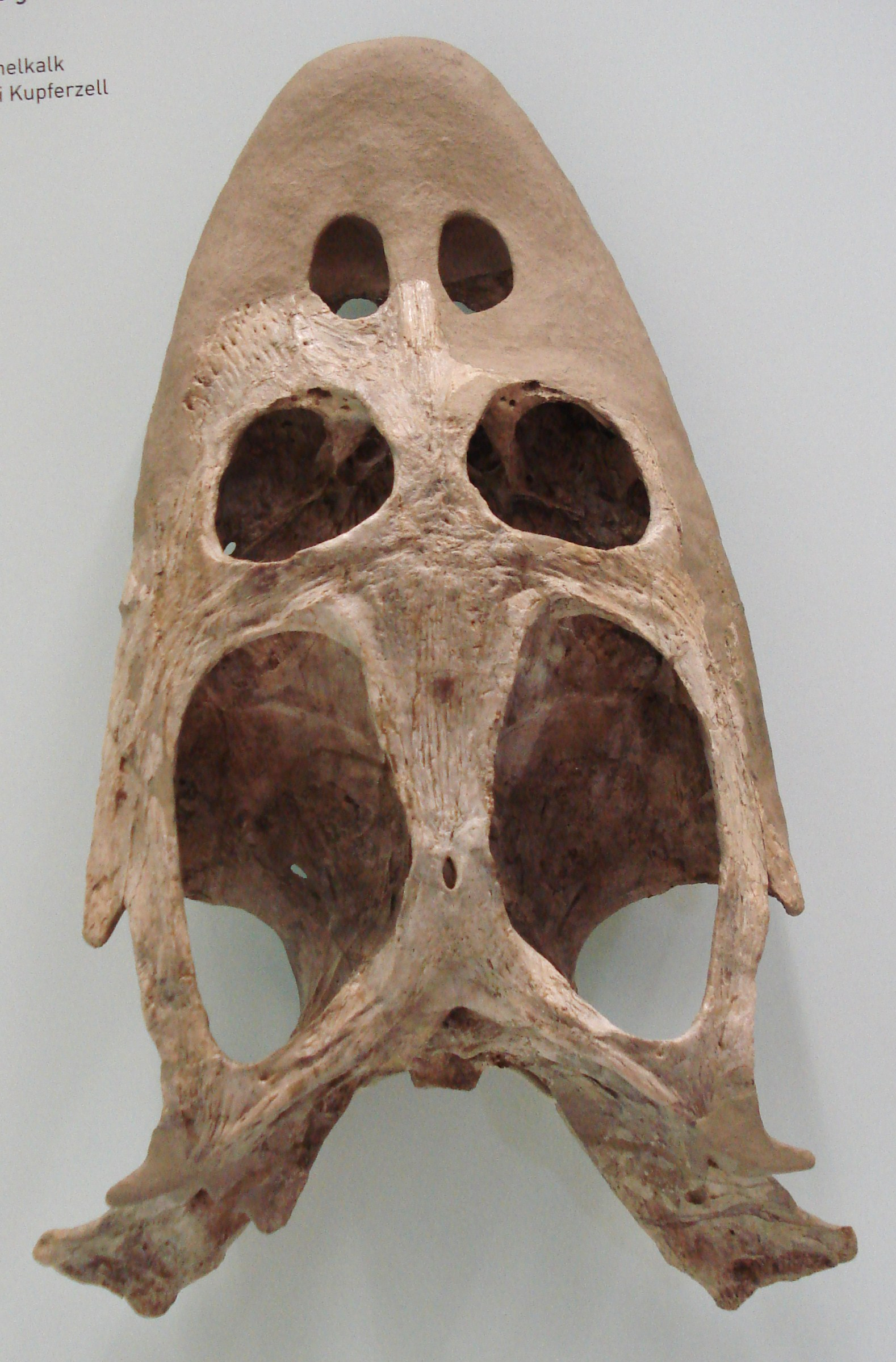
Skull

Because it has blunt teeth, Simosaurus is often thought to have been durophagous, meaning that it ate organisms with hard shells. Durophagous reptiles usually have deep jaws and large adductor muscles that close them, but Simosaurus had long, slender jaws and relatively small adductor muscles. The long jaw of Simosaurus more closely resembles those of reptiles that have snapping bites. Long jaw muscles attach to the front of the large temporal fossae in the top of the skull and slant down to the back end of the lower jaw. These long, slanted muscles exert a forward pull on the jaw, quickly snapping it shut. Smaller muscles are located farther back in the skull, attaching to the back portion of the temporal fossae. These muscles are shorter because they are angled vertically and the skull is very low along the vertical axis. Their close proximity to the jaw joint, however, allows for more crushing power to be exerted. The combination of muscles that quickly snap the jaw shut and muscles that provide crushing power at the back of the jaw is unique to Simosaurus. It probably fed on moderately hard-shelled organisms such as Ceratites and holostean fish.
