= Ceresiosaurus =

Ceresiosaurus Temporal range: Middle Triassic, 242 Ma
- C. calcagnii fossil

Scientific classification
- Kingdom: Animalia
- Phylum: Chordata
- Class: Reptilia
- Superorder: †Sauropterygia
- Order: †Nothosauroidea
- Suborder: †Nothosauria
- Family: †Nothosauridae
- Subfamily: †Lariosaurinae
- Genus: †Ceresiosaurus; Peyer, 1931

Type species
- †Ceresiosaurus calcagnii Peyer, 1931

Species
- †C. calcagnii Peyer, 1931 (type); †C. lanzi Hänni, 2004

Extinct genus of reptiles

Ceresiosaurus (meaning "lizard of Ceresio", the name of the Lake Lugano, in Switzerland) is an extinct aquatic genus of lariosaurine nothosaurid sauropterygian known from the Middle Triassic (Anisian-Ladinian boundary) of Monte San Giorgio, in southern Switzerland and northern Italy.

== History ==
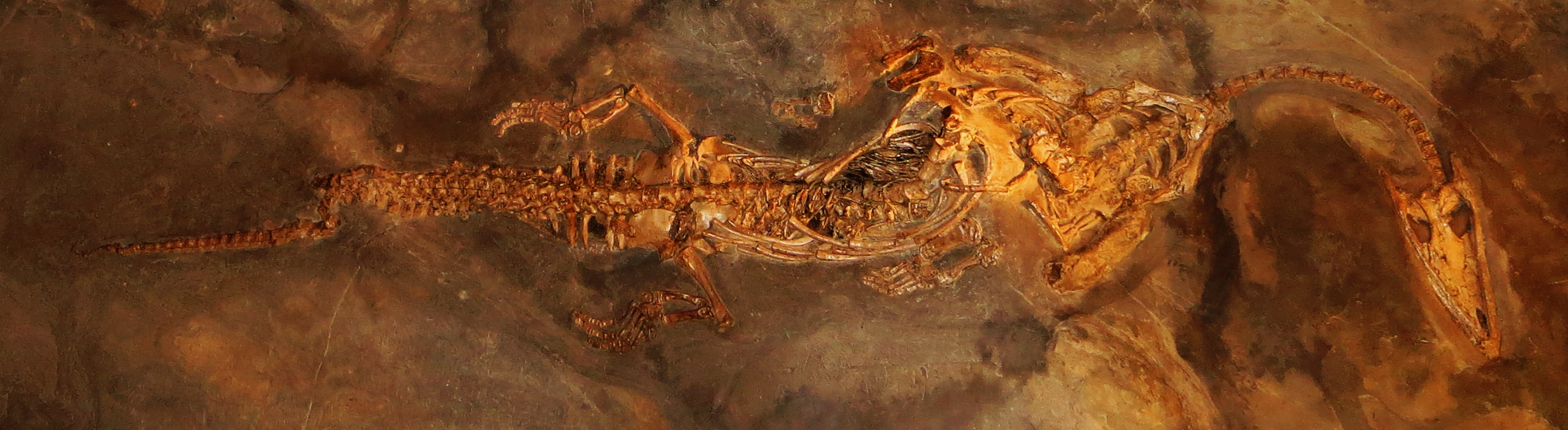
C. lanzi fossil

The type species, Ceresiosaurus calcagnii, was named by Bernhard Peyer in 1931. C. calcagnii is known from both the Cava superiore and Cava inferiore beds of the Lower Meride Limestone at Monte San Giorgio, dating to the latest Anisian of the Middle Triassic. Rieppel (1998) suggested that the back then monospecific genus Ceresiosaurus, is a junior synonym of the better known Lariosaurus, yet he kept it type species as a separate species under the new combination L. calcagnii. In 2004, however, this synonymy was objected by Hänni who described and name a second species of Ceresiosaurus, C. lanzi - a separation supported by several other authors since. This species is known only from the stratigraphically younger Cassima beds of Monte San Giorgio, although also from the Lower Meride Limestone, dating to possibly the lowest Ladinian age. The species in a subtropical lagoonal environment with varying open marine influences, and alongside many related but smaller species of nothosaurids and pachypleurosaurids. Ceresiosaurus represents one of the largest vertebrate of up to 3 m (9.8 ft) snout-tail length from the very diversified paleoenvironment of the Middle Triassic Monte San Giorgio.

== Palaeobiology ==
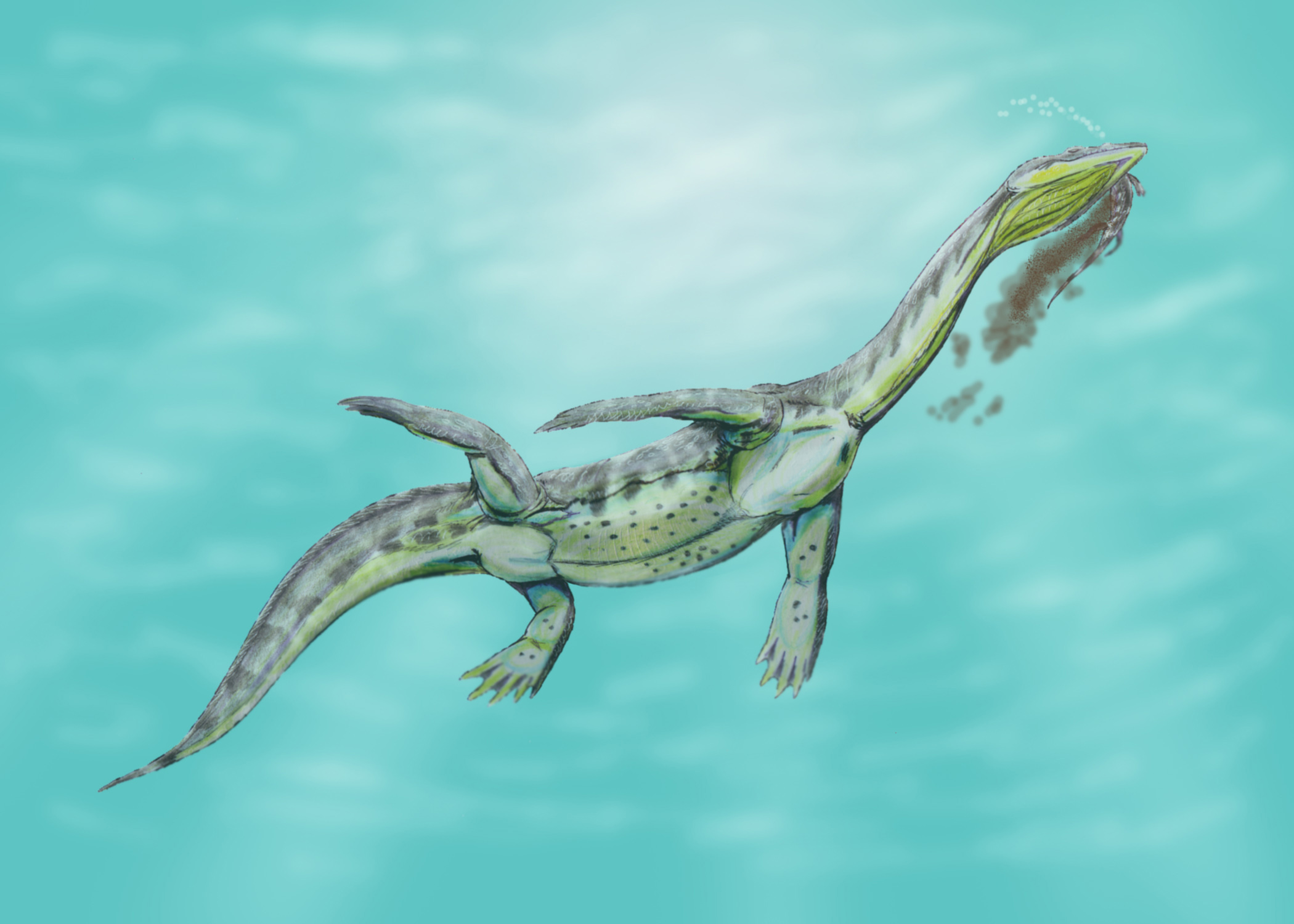
Life restoration of C. calcagnii

Ceresiosaurus was much more elongated than its relatives, reaching 3 metres (9.8 ft) in length, and had fully developed flippers with no trace of visible toes. It had multiple elongated phalanges, making the flippers much longer than in most other nothosaurs, and more closely resembling those of the later plesiosaurs. Ceresiosaurus also had the shortest skull of any known nothosaur, which further increased its resemblance to plesiosaurs.

Although possessing a long neck and tail, Ceresiosaurus may not have swum by undulating its body. Analysis of the bone structure of the hips and powerful tail suggest that it instead propelled itself through the water much like a penguin. The evidence of pachypleurosaurs in the preserved stomach of Ceresiosaurus remains lend credence to the theory of it being a fast swimmer.
