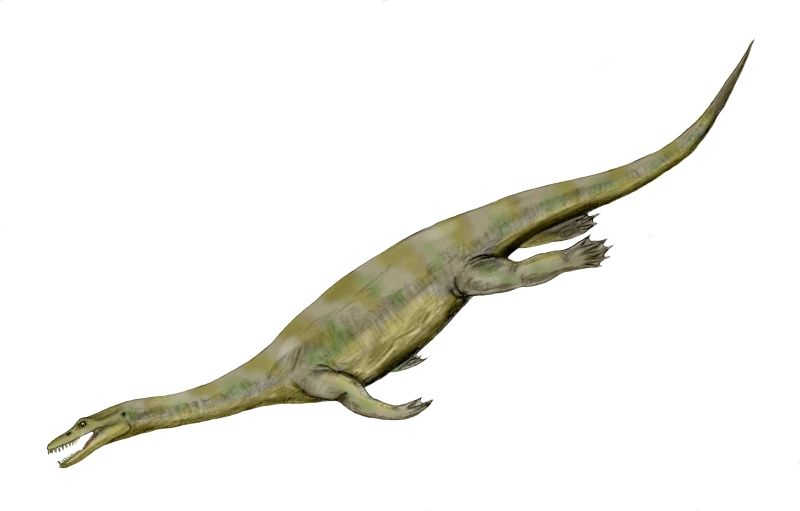
- Nothosaurus

Scientific classification
- Kingdom: Animalia
- Phylum: Chordata
- Class: Reptilia
- Superorder: †Sauropterygia
- Clade: †Eosauropterygia
- Order: †Nothosauroidea; Baur, 1889

Subgroups
- †Brevicaudosaurus?; †Dawazisaurus; †Pachypleurosauria?; †Nothosauria; †Lijiangosaurus; †Simosaurus; †Wangosaurus?; †Nothosauridae

= Nothosaur =

Nothosauroidea Temporal range: Early-Late Triassic, 251–210 Ma Possible late Rhaetian record.

Extinct order of reptiles

Nothosaurs (superfamily Nothosauroidea) were Triassic marine sauropterygian reptiles. They averaged about 3 metres (10 ft) in length, with a long body and tail. The feet were paddle-like, and are known to have been webbed in life, to help power the animal when swimming. The neck was quite long, and the head was elongated and flattened, and relatively small in relation to the body. The margins of the long jaws were equipped with numerous sharp outward-pointing teeth, indicating a diet of fish and squid.

== Taxonomy ==
The Nothosauroidea has been suggested to consist of two suborders, the Pachypleurosauria, which are small primitive forms, and the Nothosauria (including two families Nothosauridae and Simosauridae), which may have evolved from pachypleurosaurs.

The relation of pachypleurosaurs to Nothosauroidea is uncertain, as several analyses recover the clade as basal to Eusauropterygia, e.i. the clade formed by Nothosauria and Pistosauroidea, instead as the sister taxon of Nothosauria. Many recent analyses have recovered the pachypleurosaurs as a basal clade of eosauropterygians outside of the nothosauroidea.

Nothosaur-like reptiles were in turn ancestral to the more completely marine plesiosaurs, which replaced them at the end of the Triassic period.

In their 2024 description of Dianmeisaurus mutaensis, Hu, Li & Liu recovered the Nothosauroidea as the sister taxon to the Pachypleurosauria. The results of their phylogenetic analyses are shown in the cladogram below:

- Sauropterygia
  - Placodus
  - Eosauropterygia
    - Pistosauridae
    - - Majiashanosaurus
      - - Hanosaurus
        - - Nothosauroidea
          - Pachypleurosauria

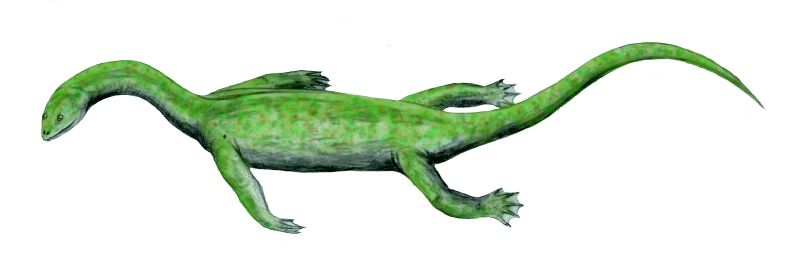
Keichousaurus (a pachypleurosaur)

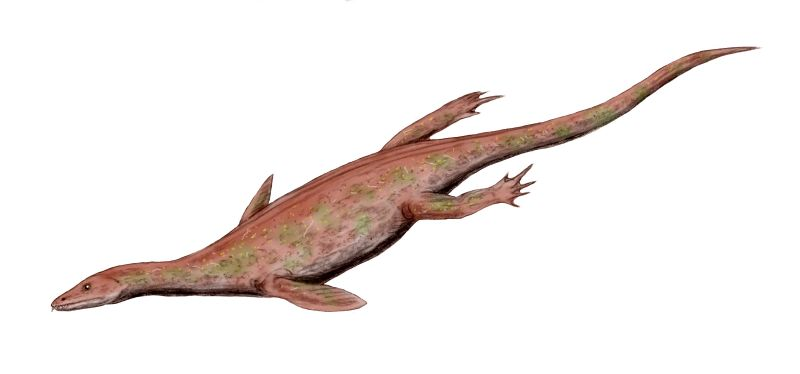
Lariosaurus

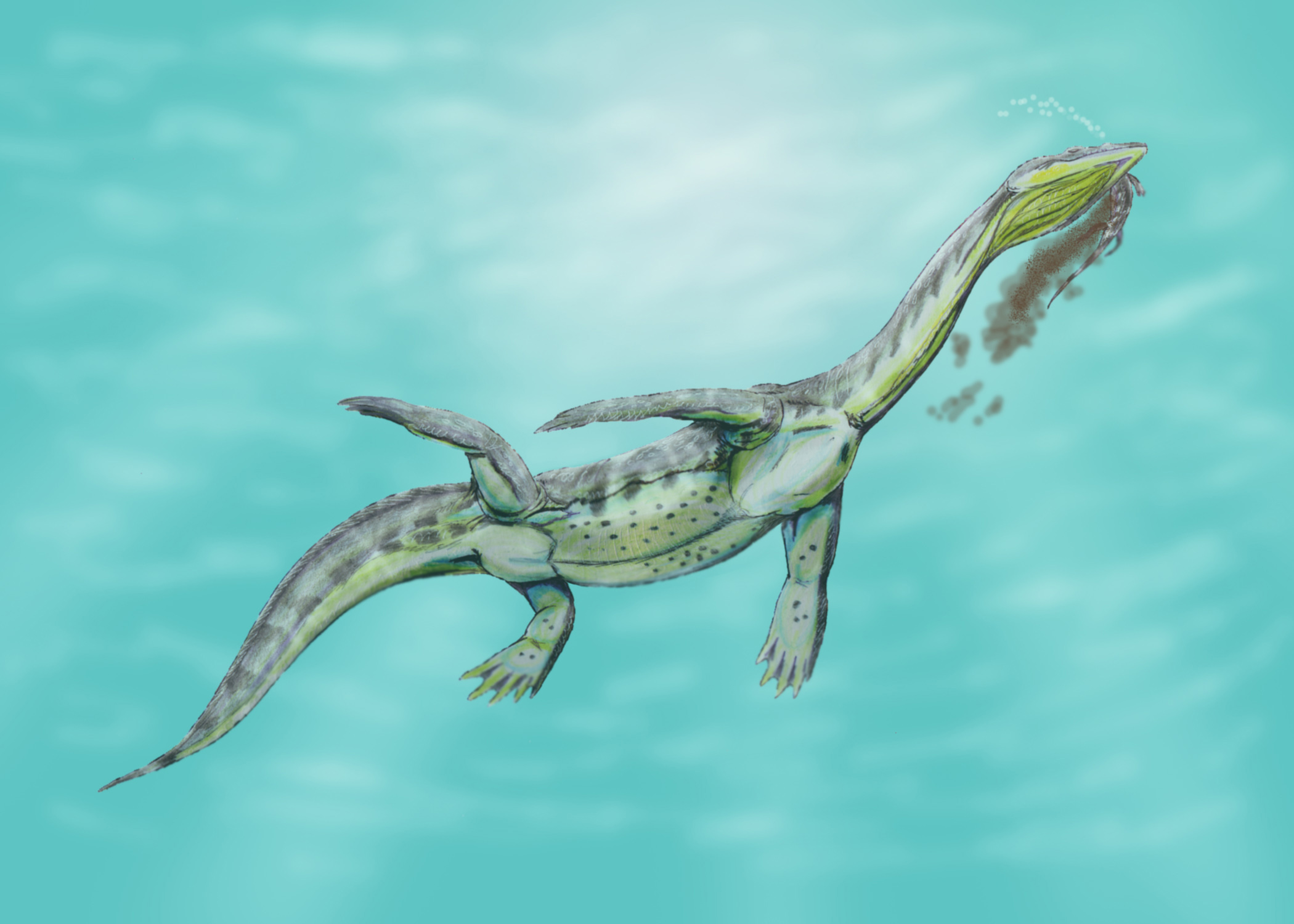
Ceresiosaurus

== Distribution ==
A 2024 description of a fossil nothosaur vertebra from the Anisian of New Zealand indicates that nothosaurs dispersed worldwide from their region of origin in the northern Tethys much earlier than presumed, eventually reaching the southern polar region of Panthalassa by the Middle Triassic. This vertebra is the oldest sauropterygian fossil from the Southern Hemisphere, and appears to be from a taxon related to Nothosaurus and Lariosaurus.

== Sources ==
- Johnson, Jinny (2000). Fantastic Facts About Dinosaurs. Parragon. ISBN 978-0-7525-3166-3.
- Benton, M. J. (2004), Vertebrate Paleontology, 3rd ed. Blackwell Science Ltd classification
- Colbert, E. H., (1969), Evolution of the Vertebrates, John Wiley & Sons Inc (2nd ed.)
- Rieppel, O., (2000), Sauropterygia I, placodontia, pachypleurosauria, nothosauroidea, pistosauroidea: In: Handbuch der Palaoherpetologie, part 12A, 134pp. Verlag Dr. Friedrich Pfeil Table of contents
