= 2022 in reptile paleontology =

This list of fossil reptiles described in 2022 is a list of new taxa of fossil reptiles that were described during the year 2022, as well as other significant discoveries and events related to reptile paleontology that occurred in 2022.

== Squamates ==
=== New taxa ===
Name	Novelty	Status	Authors	Age	Type locality	Country	Notes	Images
Abronia cuyama	Sp. nov	Valid	Scarpetta & Ledesma	Miocene	Caliente Formation	United States (California)	A species of Abronia.	
Archaeovaranus	Gen. et sp. nov	Unavailable	Dong et al.	Early Eocene	Yuhuangding Formation	China	A stem-varanid. The type species is A. lii. The electronic publication lacks registration information.	
Blutwurstia	Gen. et sp. nov	Valid	Smith, Bhullar & Bloch	Early Eocene	Willwood Formation	United States (Wyoming)	A member of Pan-Xenosaurus. The type species is B. oliviae.	
Dollogekko	Gen. et sp. nov	Valid	Čerňanský et al.	Early Eocene	Tienen Formation	Belgium	A member of Gekkota. The type species is D. dormaalensis.	
Eoscincus	Gen. et sp. nov	Valid	Brownstein et al.	Late Jurassic (Tithonian)	Morrison Formation	United States (Utah)	A member of Pan-Scincoidea. The type species is E. ornatus.	
Geiseleptes	Gen. et sp. nov	Valid	Villa, Wings & Rabi	Eocene		Germany	A member of the family Sphaerodactylidae. The type species is G. delfinoi.	
Katariana	Nom. nov	Valid	Deshmukh et al.	Early Paleocene (Danian)	Santa Lucía Formation	Bolivia	A macrostomatan snake related to caenophidians; a replacement name for Kataria Scanferla et al. (2013).	
Microteras	Gen. et sp. nov	Valid	Brownstein et al.	Late Jurassic (Tithonian)	Morrison Formation	United States (Wyoming)	A member of Pan-Scincoidea. The type species is M. borealis.	
Moqisaurus	Gen. et sp. nov	In press	Dong, Wang, & Evans	Early Cretaceous (Aptian)		China	A basal squamate possibly related to Liushusaurus. The type species is M. pulchrum.	
Powellophis	Gen. et sp. nov		Garberoglio, Triviño & Albino	Paleocene	Mealla Formation	Argentina	A madtsoiid snake. Genus includes new species P. andina.	
Psammophis odysseus	Sp. nov	Valid	Szyndlar & Georgalis	Late Miocene		Spain	A species of Psammophis.	
Retinosaurus	Gen. et sp. nov	Valid	Čerňanský et al.	Early Cretaceous (Albian)	Hkamti amber	Myanmar	A scincomorph lizard, possibly a member of Pan-Xantusiidae. The type species is R. hkamtiensis.	
Smithosaurus	Gen. et sp. nov	Valid	Vasilyan et al.	Miocene		Austria; Germany	A member of the family Anguidae belonging to the subfamily Anguinae. The type species is S. echzellensis.	
Thalassotitan	Gen. et sp. nov	In press	Longrich et al.	Late Cretaceous (Maastrichtian)	Ouled Abdoun Basin	Morocco	A mosasaurid in the tribe Prognathodontini. The type species is T. atrox.	

=== Research ===
- A study aiming to determine whether the squamate fossil record contains reliable phylogenetic information in spite of its incompleteness is published by Woolley et al. (2022).
- The first fossil material of scincomorph lizards from the Campanian Nenjiang Formation (Jilin, China) is described by Yang et al. (2022).
- Vullo et al. (2022) reinterpret the fossil material of Jeddaherdan aleadonta as Quaternary in age, and consider it to be a fossil material of a member of the genus Uromastyx.
- First fossil material of galliwasp from Cuba reported to date is described from the Late Pleistocene of El Abrón Cave by Syromyatnikova & Aranda (2022), providing the first data on tooth and jaw morphology of Pleistocene galliwasps from Cuba.
- Fossil material of Ophisaurus fejfari and Ophisaurus spinari is described from the early Pliocene of Moldova by Syromyatnikova, Klembara & Redkozubov (2022), representing the first Pliocene records of the genus Ophisaurus in Eastern Europe, and the first record of O. fejfari from the Pliocene reported to date.
- Redescription of known fossil material of Saniwa orsmaelensis, as well as description of new fossil material from the Eocene of Belgium and France, is published by Augé et al. (2022).
- A vertebra of a monitor lizard, representing the first published record of a non-snake squamate from the Neogene of Pakistan (probably Miocene Chinji Formation), is described by Villa & Delfino (2022), who evaluate the implications of this finding for the palaeoenvironmental reconstructions of the Siwaliks during the Miocene.
- A study on the diversification of feeding and locomotory strategies of mosasauroids is published by Cross et al. (2022).
- A study on the evolution of morphofunctional diversity of mosasaurids prior to the Cretaceous–Paleogene extinction event is published by MacLaren et al. (2022), who interpret their findings as indicating that taxonomic turnover in mosasaurid community composition from Campanian to Maastrichtian was reflected by a notable global increase in morphofunctional diversity, and that mosasaurid morphofunctional diversity was in decline in multiple provincial communities in the Late Maastrichtian before the Cretaceous–Paleogene mass extinction.
- A study on the evolution of the skull in mosasaurids and early cetaceans during the first 20 million years of their evolutionary histories, testing for possible instances of ecomorphological convergence in the skulls and teeth between the groups, is published by Bennion et al. (2022).
- Revision of the known mosasaur material from South Africa is published by Woolley, Chinsamy & Caldwell (2022), who recognize the presence of at least three mosasaur taxa in the Late Cretaceous deposits of South Africa, tentatively referred to cf. Prognathodon, cf. Taniwhasaurus and cf. Plioplatecarpinae.
- A study on the individual age and life history of a halisaurine mosasaur known from a cervical vertebra from the Late Cretaceous (Campanian) Beloe Ozero locality (Saratov Oblast, Russia) is published by Grigoriev et al. (2022).
- The first occurrences of Mosasaurus hoffmannii are reported from the Ouled Abdoun Basin (Morocco) by Rempert et al. (2022), extending the known range of this species.
- Two isolated tooth crowns of a member of the genus Mosasaurus are described from the Late Cretaceous (Campanian–Maastrichtian) of Cuba by Viñola-López et al. (2022), representing the first record of mosasaurs from West Indies reported to date.
- A study on the anatomy of the skull of Sanajeh indicus and on its implications for the knowledge of the evolution of features associated with wide-gaped feeding (macrostomy) in snakes, based on data from a new specimen, is published by Zaher et al. (2022).
- Wazir et al. (2022) describe an isolated dorsal vertebra of a madtsoiid snake from the Oligocene Kargil Formation of the Ladakh Molasse Group (Ladakh Himalaya), providing evidence of the survival of madtsoiids in the Indian subcontinent at least to the end of the Paleogene.
- Revision and a study on the phylogenetic affinities of Boavus is published by Onary et al. (2022).
- Chuliver, Scanferla & Smith (2022) describe a gravid female of Messelophis variatus from the Messel pit (Germany preserved with at least two embryos, documenting the first known occurrence of viviparity in a fossil snake.
- El-Hares et al. (2022) describe new fossil material of colubroidean snakes from the Eocene Birket Qarun Locality 2 (Egypt), including a vertebra of a member or a relative of the genus Procerophis (otherwise known from the early Eocene of India) and the first known caudal vertebrae of Renenutet enmerwer, as well as a vertebra representing the first record of an amphisbaenian from the Paleogene of Egypt reported to date.

== Ichthyosauromorphs ==
=== New Taxa ===
Name	Novelty	Status	Authors	Age	Type Locality	Location	Notes	Images
Baisesaurus	Gen. et sp. nov	Valid	Ren et al.	Early Triassic (Olenekian)	Luolou Formation	China	An early member of Ichthyosauromorpha . The type species is B. robustus	
Eurhinosaurus quenstedti	Sp. nov		Maisch	Early Jurassic	Posidonia Shale	Germany		
Magnipterygius	Gen. et sp. nov	Disputed	Maisch & Matzke	Early Jurassic	Posidonia Shale	Germany	A stenopterygiid ichthyosaur. The type species is M. huenei. Considered to be a junior synonym of Stenopterygius quadriscissus by Biot et al. (2026).	
Nannopterygius mikhailovi	Sp. nov	Valid	Yakupova & Akhmedenov	Late Jurassic		Kazakhstan		
Nannopterygius yakimenkae	Sp. nov	Valid	Yakupova & Akhmedenov	Late Jurassic		Kazakhstan		

=== Research ===
- Qiao et al. (2022) describe a new specimen of Sclerocormus from the Lower Triassic (Olenekian) Nanlinghu Formation (China), recover the clade Omphalosauridae containing Omphalosaurus, Sclerocormus and Cartorhynchus, and describe the anatomy of the feeding apparatus of omphalosaurids as indicated by data from the new specimen.
- Fossil material of ichthyopterygians, including a limb bone (probably a humerus) representing one of the largest specimens of early Spathian marine reptiles known to date, is described from the Lower Triassic Zhitkov Formation (Russky Island, Primorsky Krai, Russia) by Nakajima et al. (2022).
- Fossil material of giant ichthyosaurs is described from the Upper Triassic Kössen Formation (Switzerland) by Sander et al. (2022), who evaluate the implications of the studied fossils for the knowledge of the global distribution and ecological diversity of giant Norian and Rhaetian ichthyosaurs.
- A study on ichthyosaur vertebral centra from the Upper Jurassic Bernbjerg Formation (Greenland), aiming to determine whether vertebral ratios can be used to assign disarticulated and possibly weathered centra to a region in the vertebral column of ichthyosaurs, is published by Holm, Delsett & Alsen (2022).
- Fossil material of ichthyosaurs is described from the Valanginian and Hauterivian of Austria by Lukeneder et al. (2022), who interpret the studied fossils as representing two distinct taxa, probably with different feeding ecologies, and evaluate the implications of these fossils for the knowledge of the diversity of ichthyosaurs in the Early Cretaceous.
- Roberts, Engelschiøn & Hurum (2022) describe a new specimen of Phalarodon fraasi from the Ladinian Blanknuten Member of the Botneheia Formation (Svalbard, Norway), representing the first three-dimensional mixosaurid skull recovered from this formation.
- Kelley et al. (2022) interpret an assemblage of skeletons of Shonisaurus from the Triassic Luning Formation (Nevada, United States) as evidence of grouping behavior.
- A study on the dietary adaptations of juvenile specimens of Hauffiopteryx typicus and Stenopterygius triscissus from the Toarcian Strawberry Bank Lagerstätte (United Kingdom) is published by Jamison-Todd et al. (2022), who interpret their findings as indicating that S. triscissus had more robust rostrum and scavenged and hunting large fish or squid, while H. typicus relied more on bite speed than on bite force while hunting, and likely fished for smaller and softer prey.
- A study on the anatomy and phylogenetic relationships of "Ichthyosaurus" zetlandicus is published by Laboury et al. (2022), who transfer this species to the genus Temnodontosaurus.
- Lomax & Massare (2022) report the discovery of two casts of the first complete ichthyosaur skeleton introduced to the scientific community in 1819 by Everard Home, and assign this specimen to the genus Ichthyosaurus.
- Lomax, Sachs & Hall (2022) describe a composite ichthyosaur specimen from the collection of the Reutlingen Natural History Museum, including bones of at least three individuals recovered from the Sinemurian of Charmouth-Lyme Regis area (Dorset, United Kingdom) and from the Toarcian Posidonia Shale (Germany) as well as forged elements, and identify the hindfins and pelvic bones as fossil material of a rare species Ichthyosaurus conybeari.
- A study on the pre- and postnatal ontogenetic changes in the skull of Stenopterygius quadriscissus is published by Miedema & Maxwell (2022).
- Two ichthyosaur specimens (a nearly complete skeleton of a member of the genus Aegirosaurus and an isolated tail of an indeterminate ichthyosaur) preserved with soft tissue are described from the Upper Jurassic (Tithonian) Eichstätt Plattenkalk (Germany) by Delsett et al. (2022).
- Description of two specimens of Baptanodon natans from the Upper Jurassic (Oxfordian) Redwater Shale of the Sundance Formation (Wyoming, United States), providing new information on the morphology of the braincase of this ichthyosaur, is published by Massare & Connely (2022).
- Revision of the nomenclature of the families of Late Jurassic and Cretaceous ichthyosaurs is published by Zverkov (2022).

== Sauropterygians ==
=== New taxa ===
Name	Novelty	Status	Authors	Age	Type locality	Country	Notes	Images
Eardasaurus	Gen. et sp. nov	Valid	Ketchum & Benson	Middle Jurassic (Callovian)	Oxford Clay	United Kingdom	A pliosaur. The type species is E. powelli	
Honghesaurus	Gen. et sp. nov	Valid	Xu et al.	Middle Triassic (Anisian)	Guanling Formation	China	A pachypleurosaurid. The type species is H. longicaudalis.	
Nothosaurus luopingensis	Sp. nov	Valid	Shang, Li & Wang	Middle Triassic (Anisian)	Guanling Formation	China		
Plesioelasmosaurus	Gen. et sp. nov		Schumacher & Everhart	Late Cretaceous (Cenomanian)	Greenhorn Limestone	United States (Kansas)	An elasmosaurid. The type species is P. walkeri	
Prosantosaurus	Gen. et sp. nov	Valid	Klein et al.	Middle Triassic (Ladinian)	Prosanto Formation	Switzerland	A pachypleurosaur. The type species is P. scheffoldi.	
Serpentisuchops	Gen. et sp. nov		Persons, Street & Kelley	Late Cretaceous (Maastrichtian)	Pierre Shale	United States (Wyoming)	A member of the family Polycotylidae. The type species is S. pfisterae.	

=== Research ===
- Description of two placodont dentaries from the Muschelkalk of the Netherlands and Germany, possibly belonging to a member of the genus Placodus belonging or related to the species P. gigas, and a study on the implications of these fossils for the knowledge of the ontogenetic changes in placodont dentaries is published by Klein et al. (2022).
- Redescription of the holotype of Nothosaurus mirabilis is published by Klein, Eggmaier & Hagdorn (2022).
- Redescription of the type material of Ischyrodon meriani is published by Madzia, Sachs & Klug (2022).
- A study on the musculature of limbs of Cryptoclidus eurymerus, and on its implications of the knowledge of the locomotion of plesiosaurs, is published by Krahl et al. (2022).
- A study comparing the flipper muscle functions and the ability to twist flippers in Cryptoclidus eurymerus and extant aquatic amniotes is published by Krahl & Werneburg (2022).
- A study on the diversity and ontogenetic changes of cervical vertebral shapes in elasmosaurids is published by Brum et al. (2022).
- Fossil material of plesiosaurs with features of Leptocleididae is described from the Cretaceous Kem Kem Group (Morocco) by Bunker et al. (2022), representing the first Moroccan plesiosaur material reported from a freshwater paleoenvironment and the youngest known representatives of Leptocleididae.
- Description of new polycotylid material from the Maastrichtian La Colonia Formation (Argentina) and a study on the phylogenetic affinities of Sulcusuchus erraini is published by O'Gorman (2022).
- Evidence from molecular analyses of modern and fossil skeletal samples, interpreted as indicating that the metabolic rates consistent with endothermy evolved independently in mammals and plesiosaurs, is presented by Wiemann et al. (2022).

== Turtles ==
=== New taxa ===
Name	Novelty	Status	Authors	Age	Type stratum	Type locality	Notes	Images
Annemys variabilis	sp. nov	Valid	Obraztsova et al.	Middle Jurassic (Bathonian)	Itat Formation	Russia (Krasnoyarsk Krai)	A member of the family Xinjiangchelyidae.	
Appalachemys	gen. et sp. nov	In press	Gentry, Kiernan & Parham	Late Cretaceous (Santonian-Campanian)		United States (Alabama)	A "macrobaenid"-grade freshwater turtle. The type species is A. ebersolei.	
Calissounemys	gen. et sp. nov	Valid	Tong et al.	Late Cretaceous (Campanian)		France	A member of the family Compsemydidae. The type species is C. matheroni.	
Chelonoidis gersoni	sp. nov	Valid	Viñola-López & Almonte	Late Quaternary		Dominican Republic	A tortoise, a species of Chelonoidis.	
Chelonoidis meridiana	sp. nov	In press	Vlachos, de la Fuente & Sterli	Miocene		Argentina	A tortoise, a species of Chelonoidis.	
Chelydropsis aubasi	sp. nov	Valid	Joyce, Landréat & Rollot	Eocene (Bartonian)		France	A pan-chelydrid.	
Chrysemys corniculata	sp. nov		Jasinski	Miocene-Pliocene (Hemphillian-Blancan)		United States (Tennessee)	A species of Chrysemys.	
Dortoka vremiri	sp. nov	Valid	Augustin et al.	Late Cretaceous (Maastrichtian)	Sînpetru Formation	Romania	A stem-pleurodiran belonging the family Dortokidae. Argued by Tong, Buffetaut & Claude (2022) to be more likely a species belonging to the dortokid genus Ronella.	
Edowa	gen. et sp. nov		Adrian et al.	Late Cretaceous (Turonian)	Moreno Hill Formation	United States (New Mexico)	A member of the family Baenidae. The type species is E. zuniensis.	
Forachelys	gen. et sp. nov	Valid	Bourque	Miocene (Arikareean)	Las Cascadas Formation	Panama	A member of the family Geoemydidae belonging to the tribe Ptychogastrini. The type species is F. woodi.	
Gestemys	gen. et sp. nov	Valid	De la Fuente et al.	Eocene	Geste Formation	Argentina	A member of the family Podocnemididae. The type species is G. powelli.	
Hesperotestudo (Caudochelys) harrisi	sp. nov	Valid	Lichtig & Lucas	Late Barstovian	Tesuque Formation	United States (New Mexico)	A tortoise.	
Hutchemys walkerorum	sp. nov	In press	Jasinski et al.	Late Cretaceous (Maastrichtian)	Hell Creek Formation	United States (North Dakota)	A member of Pan-Trionychidae belonging to the family Plastomenidae.	
Jimemys	gen. et sp. nov	Valid	Edgar et al.	Late Cretaceous (Santonian-Campanian)	Milk River Formation	Canada	A member of Pan-Trionychidae belonging to the family Plastomenidae. The type species is J. glaebosus.	
Leiochelys	gen. et sp. nov	In press	Brinkman et al.	Late Cretaceous (Maastrichtian)	Frenchman Formation	Canada (Saskatchewan)	A pan-kinosternid. The type species is L. tokaryki.	
Leviathanochelys	gen. et sp. nov	Valid	Castillo-Visa et al.	Late Cretaceous (Campanian)	Perles Formation	Spain	A large marine turtle. The type species is L. aenigmatica.	Leviathanochelys holotype
Mokelemys	gen. et sp. nov	In press	Pérez-García	Pliocene		Democratic Republic of the Congo	A member of the family Podocnemididae belonging to the tribe Erymnochelyini. The type species is M. mbembe.	
Prochelidella palomoi	Sp. nov		Maniel, de la Fuente & Filippi	Late Cretaceous (Campanian)	Anacleto Formation	Argentina	A member of the family Chelidae.	
Solitudo	gen. et comb. et sp. nov	Valid	Valenti et al.	Pliocene and Pleistocene		Italy; Malta; Spain	A tortoise. The type species is "Testudo" robusta Leith-Adams (1877); genus also includes "Testudo" gymnesica Bate (1914), as well as new species S. sicula.	
aff. "Stylemys" gisellae	Sp. nov		Carbot-Chanona et al.	Oligocene (Arikareean)	Chilapa Formation	Mexico	A pan-tortoise.	
Testudo lohanica	Sp. nov	Valid	Pérez-García et al.	Late Miocene		Romania	A tortoise, a species of Testudo.	
Tongemys	gen. et sp. nov	Valid	Joyce et al.	Early Cretaceous (Berriasian)	Purbeck Group	United Kingdom	A member of the family Compsemydidae. The type species is T. enigmatica.	

=== Research ===
- Review of the development and evolutionary history of the scute patterns of the carapace of extant and fossil turtles is published by Ascarrunz & Sánchez-Villagra (2022).
- A study on the evolution of labyrinth morphology in living and fossil turtles is published by Evers et al. (2022), who interpret their findings as indicating that turtles have large relative labyrinth sizes that evolved independently to large labyrinths in other major vertebrate groups, and that labyrinth shape variation of turtles cannot be explained by ecology or neck function.
- A study on the biogeography of non-marine turtles over the last 100 million years is published by Chiarenza et al. (2022), indicative of a latitudinal shift in the distribution toward the equator, likely due to declining temperature.
- A clutch of turtle eggs with unique attributes of the eggshell is described from the Upper Cretaceous Kaiparowits Formation (Utah, United States) by Ferguson & Tapanila (2022), who name a new oospecies Testudoolithus tuberi.
- Silva et al. (2022) describe burrows from the Maastrichtian Adamantina Formation (Brazil) which were probably produced by freshwater turtles, and argue that this findings supports the interpretation of the original function of turtle shells as an adaptation to fossorial behavior.
- Description of the fossil material of turtles and tortoises from the Pleistocene of Crete (Greece) is published by Vlachos (2022), who rejects the validity of Testudo marginata cretensis as a distinct subspecies of the marginated tortoise.
- Scheyer et al. (2022) describe the first specimen of Proganochelys quenstedtii from the Norian Klettgau Formation (Switzerland), providing new information on the cranial anatomy of this species.
- A study on the histology of the shell of Proterochersis porebensis is published by Szczygielski & Słowiak (2022).
- Revision of the helochelydrid shell remains from the Cretaceous (Albian to Cenomanian) English greensands is published by Joyce (2022), who considers the most likely type series of Trachydermochelys phlyctaenus to be a chimera, and designates a lectotype for this species.
- Tong, Buffetaut & Claude (2022) describe an isolated costal of Dortoka vasconica from the Late Cretaceous (late Campanian-early Maastrichtian) of the Massecaps locality, extending known geographic range of this species to southern France, and interpreted by the authors as supporting the presence of two distinct lineages of Dortokidae in Western and Eastern Europe during the Late Cretaceous-Paleogene.
- The first three-dimensional reconstructions of the skulls and main neuroanatomical structures (cranial, nasal and labyrinthic cavities, nervous and carotid canals) of two specimens belonging to the genus Galianemys are presented by Martín-Jiménez & Pérez-García (2022).
- Description of the anatomy of the skull of Lakotemys australodakotensis is published by Rollot et al. (2022).
- Description of the anatomy of the skull of Trinitichelys hiatti and a study on its affinities is published by Rollot et al. (2022).
- Fossil material of Boremys pulchra, otherwise known from the Campanian of Montana and Alberta, is reported from the Hell Creek Formation of Montana by Adrian (2022), extending the stratigraphic range of the taxon through at minimum the latest Maastrichtian.
- Fossils providing evidence of the presence of large-bodied trionychids in East Asian riverine or brackish waters during the Late Cretaceous are described from the Maastrichtian Isoai Formation (Japan) by Kato et al. (2022).
- Danilov et al. (2022) describe fossil material of Campanian pan-chelonioid turtles from the Beloe Ozero locality (Rybushka Formation; Saratov Oblast, Russia), including specimens of Protostega gigas with estimated size corresponding to those of the largest specimens from North America, representing the first record of this species outside North America reported to date.
- De La Garza et al. (2022) describe an exceptionally preserved pan-cheloniid sea turtle from the Eocene Fur Formation (Denmark), preserved with fossilized limb tissue revealing an originally soft, wrinkly skin devoid of scales, which coexisted with a bony carapace covered in scutes.
- A study on the anatomy of the cast of the holotype specimen of Chinemys pani from the Pleistocene of Taiwan is published by Liaw & Tsai (2022), who interpret the holotype as a specimen of the Chinese pond turtle.
- A study on the evolution of tortoise body size over the past 23 million years is published by Joos et al. (2022), who report evidence of limited variation of tortoise body size until the reduction of both mean body size and maximum body size in mainland tortoises in the Early Pleistocene and in island tortoises in the Late Pleistocene and Holocene.
- Helm et al. (2022) report the discovery of tortoise tracks from the Pleistocene strata from South Africa's Cape south coast, providing evidence of presence of a trackmaker larger than extant tortoises from southern Africa.

== Archosauriformes ==
=== Other archosauriforms ===
==== New taxa ====
Name	Novelty	Status	Authors	Age	Type locality	Country	Notes	Images
Stenoscelida	Gen. et sp. nov	Valid	Müller, Garcia & Fonseca	Late Triassic (late Carnian/early Norian)		Brazil	A member of the family Proterochampsidae. Genus includes new species S. aurantiacus.	
Vigilosaurus	Gen. et sp. nov	Valid	Chen & Liu	Permian (Changhsingian)	Guodikeng Formation	China	Genus includes new species V. gaochangensis. Announced in 2022; the final article version was published in 2023. Initially identified as a possible proterochampsian archosauriform, but later identified as a probable non-saurian neodiapsid.	

==== Research ====
- Fossils of possible members of the genera Chasmatosuchus and Proterosuchus are described from the Sanga do Cabral Formation by de-Oliveira et al. (2022), representing the first unambiguous archosauriform records from the Lower Triassic of Brazil reported to date.
- Redescription and a study on the phylogenetic affinities of Sphodrosaurus pennsylvanicus is published by Ezcurra & Sues (2022), who reinterpret this taxon as a doswelliid.
- Redescription and a study on the phylogenetic affinities of Proterochampsa nodosa is published by De Simão-Oliveira et al. (2022).
- Fabbri & Bhullar (2022) describe the endocast of Euparkeria capensis, interpreting the brain morphology of Euparkeria as overall similar to those of phytosaurs, crocodilians and early dinosaurs.

== Other reptiles ==
=== New taxa ===
Name	Novelty	Status	Authors	Age	Type locality	Country	Notes	Images
Belebey shumovi	Sp. nov	In press	Bulanov et al.	Permian (Guadalupian)	Belebey Formation	Russia (Udmurtia)	A bolosaurid.	
Champsosaurus norelli	Sp. nov	Valid	Brownstein	Paleocene (Tiffanian)	Polecat Bench Formation	United States (Wyoming)		
Cryptovaranoides	Gen. et sp. nov	Unavailable	Whiteside, Chambi-Trowell & Benton	Late Triassic (Rhaetian)		United Kingdom	A neodiapsid reptile of uncertain affinities. Originally described as an early member of the crown group of Squamata, possibly a member of Neoanguimorpha; Brownstein et al. (2023) excluded it from the crown group of Squamata, and considered it more likely to have affinities with early archosauromorphs, but Whiteside, Chambi-Trowell & Benton (2024) reaffirmed their original interpretation. The type species is C. microlanius. The electronic publication lacks registration information.	
Kosmodraco	Gen. et comb. et sp. nov	Valid	Brownstein	Paleocene		United States (North Dakota; Wyoming)	A member of Choristodera belonging to the family Simoedosauridae. The type species is "Simoedosaurus" dakotensis Erickson (1987); genus also includes new species K. magnicornis.	
Maiothisavros	Gen. et sp. nov	Valid	Mooney et al.	Permian (Artinskian)		United States (Oklahoma)	An early member of Neodiapsida. The type species is M. dianeae.	
Navajosphenodon	Gen. et sp. nov	Valid	Simões, Kinney-Broderick & Pierce	Early Jurassic (Sinemurian-Pliensbachian)	Kayenta Formation	United States (Arizona)	A rhynchocephalian belonging to the group Sphenodontinae. The type species is N. sani.	
Opisthiamimus	Gen. et sp. nov	In press	DeMar, Jones, & Carrano	Late Jurassic (Kimmeridgian-Tithonian)	Morrison Formation	United States (Wyoming)	A basal rhynchocephalian. The type species is O. gregori.	
Pomolispondylus	Gen. et sp. nov	Valid	Cheng et al.	Early Triassic (Olenekian)	Jialingjiang Formation	China	A relative of family Saurosphargidae, belonging to the new group Saurosphargiformes. The type species is P. biani.	
Puercosuchus	Gen. et sp. nov	In press	Marsh et al.	Late Triassic (Norian)	Chinle Formation	United States (Arizona)	An allokotosaur belonging to the family Azendohsauridae. The type species is P. traverorum.	
Quasicolognathus	Gen. et sp. nov	Valid	Sues, Kligman & Schoch	Middle Triassic (Ladinian)	Erfurt Formation	Germany	A reptile with similarities to Colognathus, belonging to the new family Colognathidae. The type species is Q. eothen.	

=== Research ===
- A study on the proportions of skull and limb bones in mesosaur specimens, aiming to determine whether there are statistically significant morphological differences through ontogenetic development among mesosaurs coming from Africa, Brazil and Uruguay, and evaluating the implications of the developmental pattern found in mesosaurs for the knowledge of the phylogeny and evolution of growth patterns of early amniotes, is published by Núñez Demarco, Ferigolo & Piñeiro (2022).
- A study on the ontogenetic changes in mesosaurs is published by Verrière & Fröbisch (2022), who interpret their findings as indicative of a progressive ecological shift during the growth of mesosaurs, and supporting the interpretation of Mesosaurus tenuidens as the only valid species within Mesosauridae, with specimens assigned to Stereosternum tumidum and Brazilosaurus sanpauloensis representing immature stages or incomplete specimens of Mesosaurus.
- A study on tooth implantation, replacement and attachment in Scoloparia glyphanodon is published by Jenkins & Bhullar (2022).
- Revision and a study on the phylogenetic affinities of bradysaurian pareiasaurs from the Guadalupian of the Karoo Basin (South Africa) is published by Van den Brandt et al. (2022).
- A study on the anatomy of the skull of Captorhinus aguti, indicative of the presence of distinct anatomical modules on each side of the skull, and evaluating the implications of this modularity pattern for the knowledge of the evolution and function of temporal openings in amniote skulls, is published by Werneburg & Abel (2022).
- Description of the suture morphology within the dermatocranium of Captorhinus aguti is published by Abel et al. (2022), who also reconstruct the jaw adductor musculature of this reptile, and attempt to determine whether the reconstructed cranial mechanics in C. aguti could be treated as a model for the ancestor of fenestrated amniotes.
- Bazzana et al. (2022) study the virtual cranial and otic endocasts of two captorhinid specimens, providing evidence of more complex and diverse neuroanatomy of early sauropsids than previously anticipated.
- New fossil material of Moradisaurus grandis (two partial skulls of juvenile individuals) is described from the Permian Moradi Formation (Niger) by Sidor et al. (2022).
- Redescription of the anatomy of the postcranial skeleton of Coelurosauravus elivensis is published by Buffa et al. (2022).
- Redescription and a study on the phylogenetic affinities of Palacrodon is published by Jenkins et al. (2022).
- A new specimen of Helveticosaurus zollingeri is described from the outcrops of the Middle Triassic Besano Formation in the province of Varese (Italy by Bindellini & Dal Sasso (2022), who provide an updated skeletal reconstruction of this species, and study its phylogenetic affinities, swimming mode and possible ecological niche.
- Redescription of the type specimens of Opisthias rarus is published by Herrera-Flores, Stubbs & Sour-Tovar (2022), who also describe a new specimen of Theretairus antiquus from the Upper Jurassic Morrison Formation (Como Bluff, Wyoming, United States), and interpret T. antiquus as a taxon distinct from O. rarus.
- Partial dentary of a rhynchocephalian is described from an intertrappean deposit from the Naskal locality within the Deccan Traps Volcanic Province (India) by Anantharaman et al. (2022), representing the first known record of a rhynchocephalian from the Cretaceous–Paleogene transition outside of Patagonia.
- Description of a near-complete skeleton of Bellairsia gracilis from the Bathonian Kilmaluag Formation (Scotland, United Kingdom) and a study on the affinities of this stem-squamate is published by Tałanda et al. (2022).
- Description of a nearly complete skeleton of Hanosaurus hupehensis from the Lower Triassic (Olenekian) Jialingjiang Formation (Hubei, China) is published by Wang et al. (2022), who find Hanosaurus to be an aquatic reptile with slender and elongate trunk and shortened limbs (a convergence in body plan with members of other groups of marine reptiles, such as Chaohusaurus, Nanchangosaurus and Pleurosaurus), and recover it as the basalmost member of the new clade Sauropterygiformes (which additionally includes Atopodentatus, Helveticosaurus, saurosphargids, placodontiforms and eosauropterygians).
- A large rib bearing an osteoderm is described from the Upper Triassic Kössen Formation (Switzerland) by Scheyer et al. (2022), who interpret this specimen as a member or a relative of the family Saurosphargidae with potential affinities to the genus Largocephalosaurus, potentially extending the occurrence of saurosphargids about 35 million years into the Late Triassic.
- Description of the neomorphic ossification between the parietal, quadrate and squamosal in the skulls of Coeruleodraco jurassicus and Philydrosaurus proseilus is published by Qin, Yi & Gao (2022).
- New specimen of Hyphalosaurus lingyuanensis with well preserved integumentary remains is described from the Lower Cretaceous Yixian Formation (China) by Wang et al. (2022).
- A study aiming to model the type of respiratory system able to meet the metabolic demands of Tanystropheus is published by de Souza & Klein (2022).
- Description of new specimens of Hyperodapedon from Brazil with apically serrated teeth crowns, representing new maxillary tooth morphotype and the first records of serrated teeth in rhynchosaurs, and a study aiming to determine whether the maxillary crown morphology of rhynchosaurs is taxonomically informative or reflects ontogeny, is published by Scartezini & Soares (2022).
- A study on the external morphology and microanatomy of premaxillae of Hyperodapedon is published by Mukherjee & Ray (2022), who report evidence of morphological correlates for innervation in the studied premaxillae, and argue that the Hyperodapedon premaxillae had heightened sensory capabilities.
- A study on the anatomy and phylogenetic affinities of Tricuspisaurus thomasi and Variodens inopinatus is published by Chambi-Trowell et al. (2022).
- A study on the morphology of the braincase of Trilophosaurus buettneri, and on its implications for the knowledge of the evolution of neurocranium in early pan-archosaurs, is published by Wilson et al. (2022).
- A study on the skeletal anatomy and phylogenetic affinities of Shringasaurus indicus is published by Sengupta & Bandyopadhyay (2022).

== Reptiles in general ==
- A new time tree for the evolution of early amniotes and reptiles is presented by Simões et al. (2022), who interpret their findings as indicative of a close association between climate changes and reptile evolutionary dynamics across the Permian and Triassic.
- A study on the impact of the body size and shape on drag in ichthyosaurs and plesiosaurs, and on the impact of this relationship on the evolution of trunk length and neck proportions in Sauropterygia, is published by Gutarra et al. (2022).
- A study on the morphospace distribution, morphological diversity and evolutionary rates of lepidosaurs throughout their evolutionary history is published by Bolet et al. (2022).
- Tracks produced by squamates or rhynchocephalians are described from the Lower Cretaceous Botucatu Formation (Brazil) by Buck et al. (2022), representing the first known evidence of the presence of lepidosaurs in the ancient Botucatu desert.
- A study on the evolution of relative skull sizes in Paleozoic and Mesozoic archosauromorph reptiles is published by Bestwick et al. (2022), who interpret their findings as indicating that relative skull sizes of erythrosuchids and theropod dinosaurs are distinct from each other, and that the disproportionately large skulls of erythrosuchids were unique among all terrestrial archosauromorphs.
