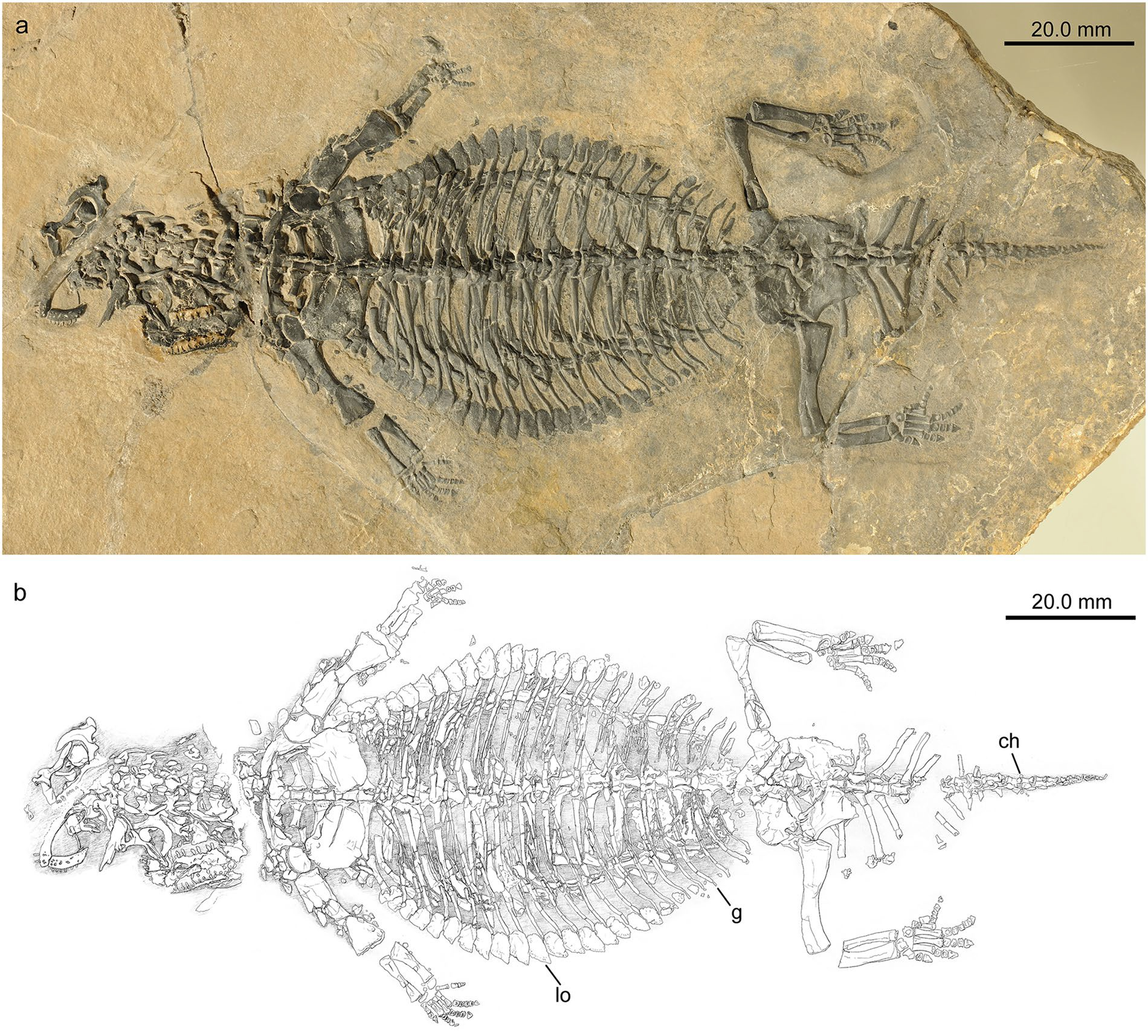
- Eusaurosphargis dalsassoi PIMUZ A/III 4380

Scientific classification
- Kingdom: Animalia
- Phylum: Chordata
- Class: Reptilia
- Clade: Archosauromorpha (?)
- Family: †Helveticosauridae; Peyer, 1955

Genera
- †Eusaurosphargis; †Helveticosaurus

= Helveticosauridae =

Helveticosauridae Temporal range: Middle Triassic, 243–241 Ma

Extinct family of reptiles

Helveticosauridae is an extinct proposed family of basal marine reptiles known from the Middle Triassic (Anisian-Ladinian boundary) of southern Switzerland and northern Italy.

The type species of the family is Helveticosaurus zollingeri, named by Bernhard Peyer in 1955 based on a single nearly complete specimen T 4352 collected at Cava Tre Fontane from the Anisian-Ladinian boundary of Monte San Giorgio, Switzerland. Peyer (1955) considered the species to be a very distinctive member of the order Placodontia, and thus erected Helveticosauridae as well as the superfamily Helveticosauroidea to contain it within Placodontia.

Nosotti and Rieppel (2003) described Eusaurosphargis from the equivalent beds at Cava di Besano of the Besano Formation (Anisian-Ladinian boundary) of Italy. Their phylogenetic analysis recovered it as the sister taxon of Helveticosaurus, and thus it was assigned to Helveticosauridae. Based on the description in the literature available for Saurosphargis (whose holotype is lost), they considered it to also fall in the Helveticosauridae clade. The anatomy of Saurosphargis was finally clarified by comparisons with the well-preserved specimens of Sinosaurosphargis, and as a result Saurosphargis was no longer considered to be a nomen dubium, and thus could be included in a phylogenetic analysis. Li et al. (2011) found Saurosphargis and Sinosaurosphargis to form a clade separate from that of Eusaurosphargis and Helveticosaurus, thus Saurosphargis was removed from Helveticosauridae, and placed in its own family Saurosphargidae together with Sinosaurosphargis.

However, other studies have questioned the existence of Helveticosauridae, finding no clear evidence of a close relationship between the two genera. Wang et al. 2022 found Eusaurosphargis to be a member of Saurosphargidae, with Helveticosaurus being more closely related to Sauropterygia, while Wolniewicz, et al. 2023, found Eusaurosphargis to form a clade with Palatodonta more closely related to Sauropterygia than Helveticosaurus.
