= Helveticosaurus =

Helveticosaurus Temporal range: Middle Triassic, 242 Ma
- Fossil at the Natural History Museum, Zurich

Scientific classification
- Kingdom: Animalia
- Phylum: Chordata
- Class: Reptilia
- Clade: †Sauropterygiformes
- Genus: †Helveticosaurus; Peyer, 1955

Type species
- †Helveticosaurus zollingeri Peyer, 1955 (type)

Extinct genus of reptiles

Helveticosaurus is an extinct genus of diapsid marine reptile known from the Middle Triassic (Anisian-Ladinian boundary) of southern Switzerland and Italy. It contains a single species, Helveticosaurus zollingeri, mainly known from a nearly complete holotype skeleton, PIMUZ T 4352. The skeleton was collected at the Cava Tre Fontane site on Monte San Giorgio, a mountain well known for its rich record of marine life during the Middle Triassic.

== Description and paleobiology ==
External image
- Skeletal diagram of Helveticosaurus scale bar = 20 cm (~7.9 in)

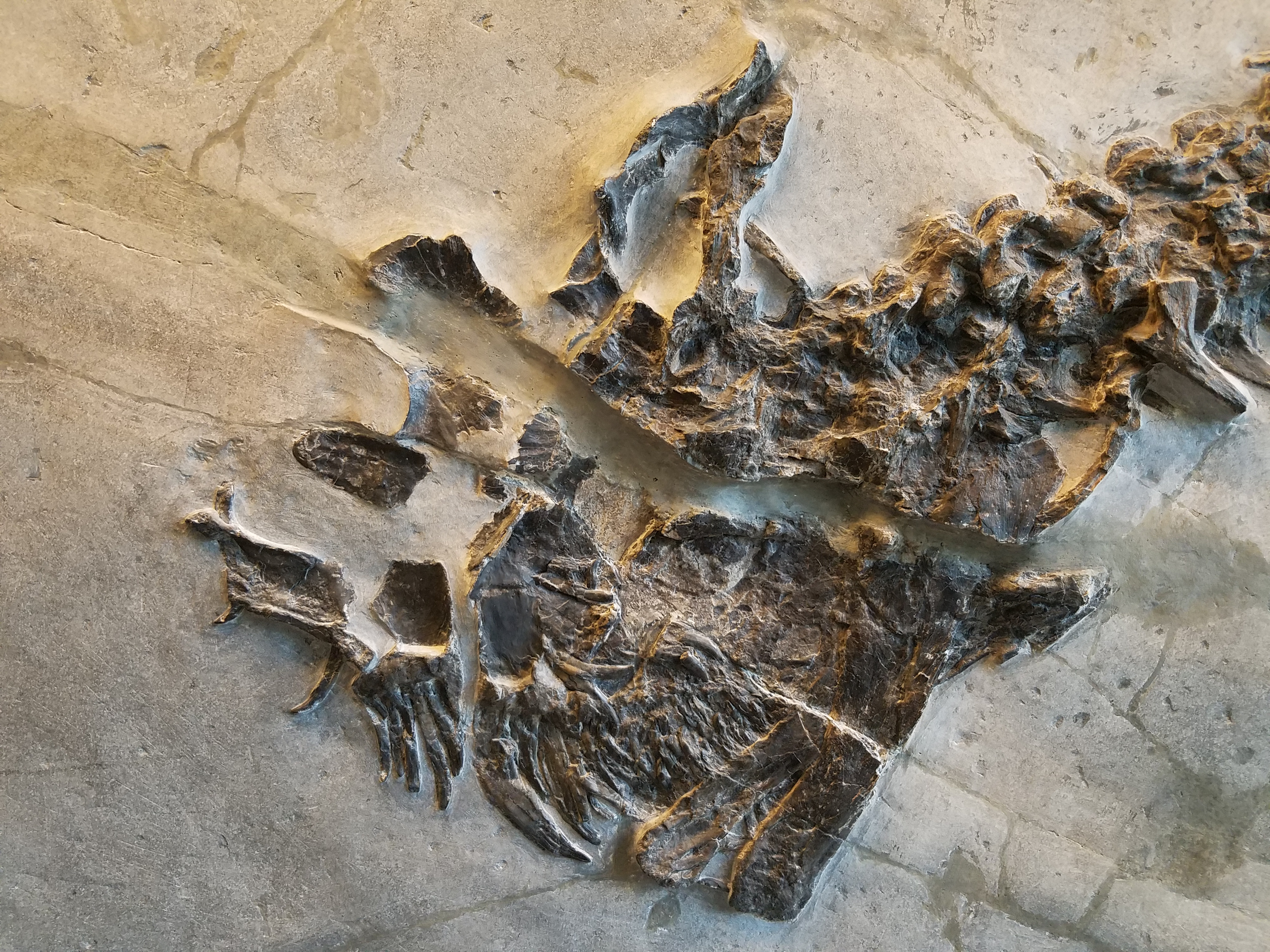
Close view of the skull

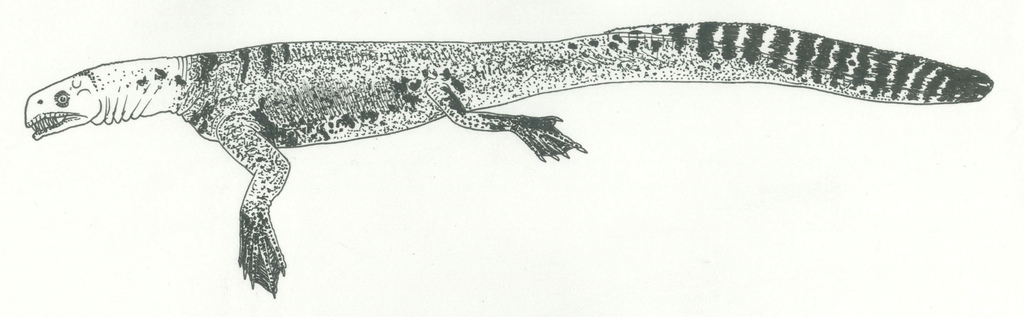
Restoration by Darren Naish.

Helveticosaurus is primarily known from a nearly complete holotype which includes a crushed skull and a postcranial skeleton. Several disarticulated elements are also known including teeth, portions of the snout and postcranial elements. The skeleton of Helveticosaurus preserves 2–2.5 metres (6.6–8.2 ft), but much of the tail is missing. Its total estimated length is about 3.6 metres (12 ft), from the snout to the tip of the tail.

Size compared to a human. Tail not preserved so length is hypothetical

It possessed many adaptations to a marine lifestyle in the shallow-sea environment that existed in Europe at a time when much of the continent was part of the Tethys Ocean. The deep, muscular tail is similar to what can be seen in other extinct marine reptiles such as thalattosaurs, and it probably propelled itself through the water by means of lateral undulation of the tail. However, Helveticosaurus also possessed a robust pectoral girdle and long forelimbs that were well adapted for paddle-like propulsion as a supplementary method of locomotion, as seen in secondarily aquatic tetrapods. This unique combination of undulation and paddling is highly unusual for an aquatic reptile. Helveticosaurus may have been capable of rapid acceleration. The scapula is well developed and robust, in contrast to many other marine reptiles.

The limb and hip bones are not fully ossified and have cartilage caps at the joints, a form of paedomorphosis (retention of juvenile traits) common among aquatic reptiles. Similarly, the wrist and ankle bones are extremely reduced, with only two or three carpals in the forelimb and a single tarsal in the hindlimb. On the other hand, the fingers are long and slender, with an increased number of bones per finger compared to terrestrial reptiles.

The skull, while only partially known due to the crushed nature of the skull rendering many of its parts unidentifiable, appears to have been relatively short and blunt, around 25 centimetres (9.8 in) long, with a diapsid condition with both lower and upper temporal fenestrae. The caniniform (long, fang-like) teeth suggest a predatory lifestyle for Helveticosaurus. Unlike most other marine reptiles which exhibited a lengthening and narrowing of the skull, the head of Helveticosaurus was more robust and box-like. It is unknown what purpose the shortness of the skull would have had in feeding, with suction feeding having been tentatively proposed by Mark Witton as a possible function. Proposed prey items include soft prey like cephalopods, as well as small-medium sized vertebrates like fish.

Helveticosaurus, while primarily aquatically adapted, was probably capable of some terrestrial locomotion, perhaps equivalent to the degree accomplished by seals.

== Relationship with other sauropsids ==
Upon its naming and description in 1955, Helveticosaurus was classified as a member of the order Placodontia, a group of robust, barrel-bodied Triassic marine reptiles. It was seen as a basal member of the clade, being assigned to the new family Helveticosauridae of the Helveticosauroidea superfamily.

Its affinities with other diapsids are unclear, as it differs greatly from any other known types of marine reptiles, with no apparent close relatives. It shares some characteristics with archosauromorphs, and Rieppel (1989) tentatively suggested that it may be related to that group. One 2013 analysis of fossil reptile relationships found Helveticosaurus, together with Eusaurosphargis and Saurosphargis, to be most closely related to either the ichthyopterygians or sauropterygians in a large clade of marine reptiles within archosauromorpha. Some phylogenetic analyses recover a sister taxon relationship between Helveticosaurus and Eusaurosphargis, with one analysis recovering them at successive positions instead. The following cladogram is simplified after the phylogenetic analysis of Li et al. (2014), which includes Eusaurosphargis, Helveticosaurus and all known saurosphargid species. The removal / inclusion of Ichthyopterygia was found to affect the topology the most - switching the positions of the Eusaurosphargis+Helveticosaurus and Thalattosauriformes clades, and altering the positions of several taxa within Eosauropterygia, which are not shown.

- Sauria
  - Archosauromorpha
  - Lepidosauromorpha
  - Testudines
  - - Ichthyopterygia
    - - Thalattosauriformes
      - - - Helveticosaurus zollingeri
          - Eusaurosphargis dalsassoi
        - - Sauropterygia
            - Placodontia
            - Eosauropterygia
          - Saurosphargidae
            - - Largocephalosaurus polycarpon
              - Largocephalosaurus qianensis
            - - Saurosphargis volzi
              - Sinosaurosphargis yunguiensis

Other later studies have not recovered a close relationship between Helveticosaurus and Eusaurosphargis, though many still support that both taxa are more closely related to Sauropterygia than to other extinct reptile groups. Cladogram after Wang et al. 2022:

- Youngina
- - Thalattosauria
  - - Ichthyosauromorpha
    - Sauropterygiformes
      - Hanosaurus
      - - Saurosphargidae
          - Eusaurosphargis
          - - Sinosaurosphargis
            - Largocephalosaurus
        - - Helveticosaurus
          - Sauropterygia
            - - Atopodentatus
              - Placodontiformes
                - Palatodonta
                - Placodontia
            - Eosauropterygia (including Plesiosauria)

Cladogram after Wolniewicz et al. 2023:

- Sauria
  - Lepidosauromorpha
  - - Pantestudines
    - - Archosauromorpha
      - - †Thalattosauria
        - - †Ichthyosauromorpha
          - - †Helveticosaurus
            - †Sauropterygomorpha
              - - - †Eusaurosphargis
                  - †Palatodonta
                - Sauropterygia
                  - - †Atopodentatus
                    - †Placodontia
                  - - †Saurosphargidae
                      - Prosaurosphargis
                      - Largocephalosaurus
                      - Sinosaurosphargis
                    - - †Pomolispondylus
                      - - †Majiashanosaurus
                        - †Hanosaurus
                        - Eosauropterygia (including Plesiosauria)

=== Possible relatives ===
Pelvic material from SVT 203, found from older Early Triassic strata in Spitsbergen, may share similarities with the pelvic material known from Helveticosaurus. However, this is only if the anterior element of the pelvic girdle in Helveticosaurus is interpreted as the pubis. The pubis of SVT 203 also shares similarities with placodonts, although the ischium differs in lacking constriction. SVT 203 was once referred to the ichthyosaur Grippia longirostris, but the pubis, femur, metatarsals, and phalanges suggest that it is not from an ichthyopterygian, therefore making it more probable that it belongs to a taxon related, and possibly ancestral, to Helveticosaurus, although more material is needed to give a definitive confirmation. The small size of material comprising SVT 203 in relation to Helveticosaurus, along with the compression seen on both ends of the femur, may indicate that it is a juvenile form of the species to which it belongs, but both temporal and geographical separation of SVT 203 with Helveticosaurus makes size comparison as a means of determining immaturity unnecessary, as it is possible that Helveticosaurus evolved from an ancestor that was smaller in overall size.
