= Pomolispondylus =

Pomolispondylus Temporal range: Early Triassic

Scientific classification
- Kingdom: Animalia
- Phylum: Chordata
- Class: Reptilia
- Clade: †Sauropterygiformes
- Superorder: †Sauropterygia
- Genus: †Pomolispondylus; Cheng et al., 2022

Type species
- †Pomolispondylus biani Cheng et al., 2022

Extinct genus of marine reptiles

Pomolispondylus (meaning "knobbly vertebra" in Greek) is an extinct genus of marine reptile known from the Early Triassic Jialingjiang Formation of China. It contains a single species, Pomolispondylus biani, known from a partial skeleton.

== Classification ==
Phylogenetic analyses by Cheng et al. (2022) found it to be most closely related to Saurosphargidae, a Middle Triassic family of marine reptiles. The describing authors thus erected a new group, Saurosphargiformes, to include both Pomolispondylus and Saurosphargidae. In contrast, Wolniewicz et al. (2023) instead recovered Pomolispondylus in a position closer to Eosauropterygia than to saurosphargids. These results are displayed in the cladogram below:

- Sauropterygomorpha
  - - Eusaurosphargis dalsassoi
    - Palatodonta bleekeri
  - Sauropterygia
    - - Atopodentatus unicus
      - Placodontia
    - - Saurosphargidae
        - Prosaurosphargis yingzishanensis
        - Largocephalosaurus qianensis
        - Sinosaurosphargis yunguiensis
      - - Pomolispondylus biani
        - - Majiashanosaurus discocoracoidis
          - Hanosaurus hupehensis
          - Eosauropterygia
