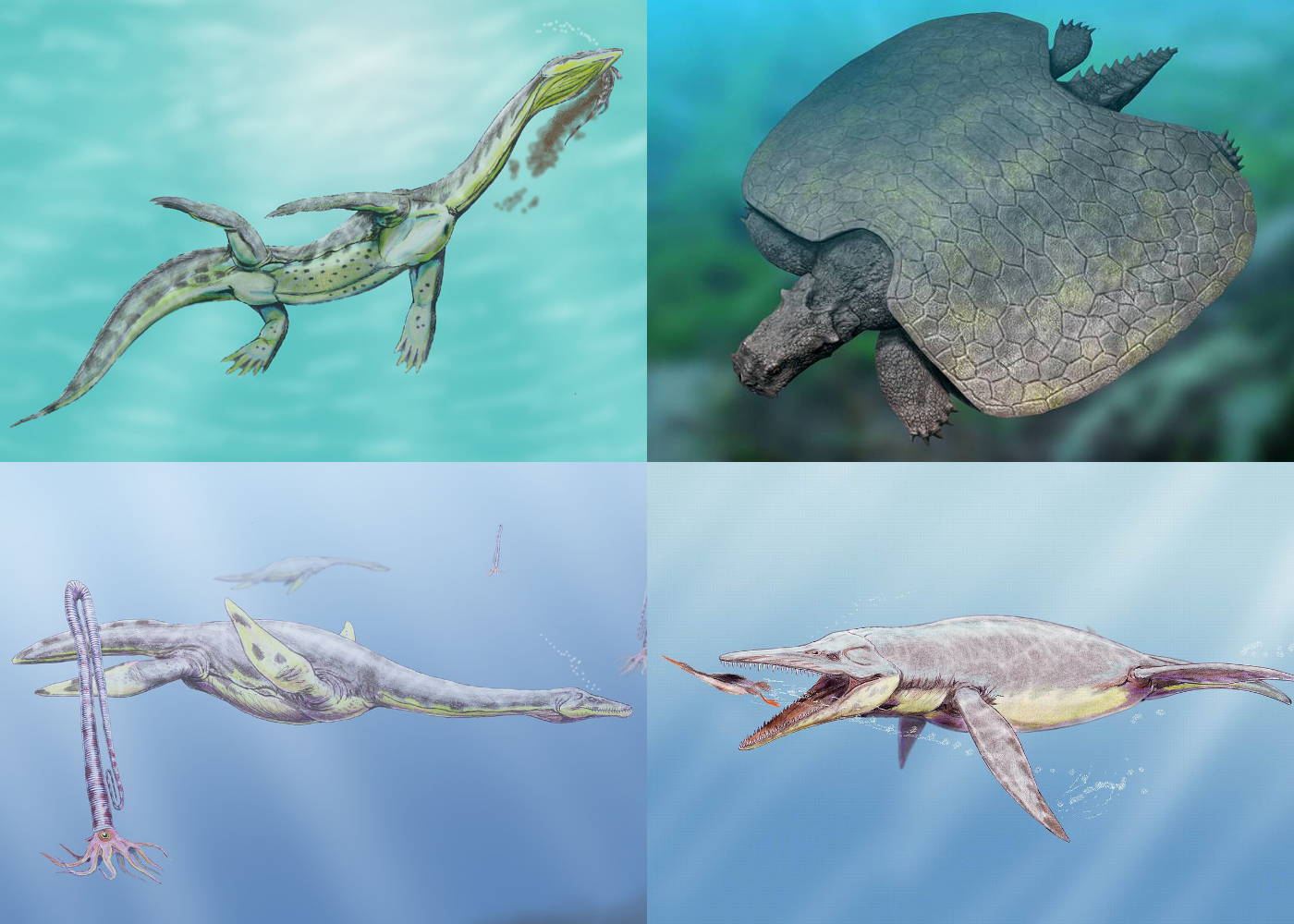
- Sauropterygia diversity. Clockwise from top left: Ceresiosaurus calcagnii (Nothosauroidea), Henodus chelyops (Placodontia), Brachauchenius lucasi, Aristonectes parvidens (Plesiosauria).
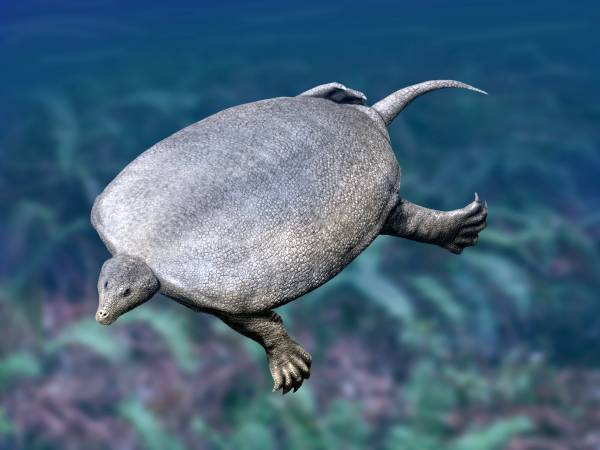
- Sinosaurosphargis (Saurosphargidae)

Scientific classification
- Kingdom: Animalia
- Phylum: Chordata
- Class: Reptilia
- Clade: Neodiapsida
- Clade: †Sauropterygiformes; Wang et al. 2022

Subdivisions
- †Helveticosaurus; †Eusaurosphargis; †Hanosaurus; †Palatodonta; †Pomolispondylus; †Saurosphargidae; †Sauropterygia

= Sauropterygiformes =

Sauropterygiformes Temporal range: Early Triassic–Late Cretaceous

Proposed clade of marine reptiles

Sauropterygiformes is a proposed clade of largely marine reptiles that includes Sauropterygia (including Plesiosauria) and its close extinct relatives including several other marine reptile groups from the Triassic period. The clade was coined by Wang and colleagues in 2022, also including in addition to Sauropterygia Helveticosaurus, Hanosaurus (otherwise often considered a true sauropterygian) and Saurosphargidae. A 2023 study coined a similar clade, Sauropterygomorpha to encompass Sauropterygia, as well as Eusaurosphargis (which the 2022 study found to be within Saurosphargidae) and Palatodonta (which had previously been recovered as a true sauropterygian) but not Helveticosaurus. In this study, Saurosphargidae and Hanosaurus were found to be nested within Sauropterygia proper. A 2025 study redefined Sauropterygiformes as the "largest clade that includes Sauropterygia but none of Archosauria, Lepidosauria, Ichthyopterygia, or Thalattosauria."^{supplementary material} This study noted that the interrelationships of basal (early diverging) members of Sauropterygiformes was highly unstable.^{supplementary material}

The relationship of Sauropterygiformes to other reptiles is debated (discussed in more detail at classication and relationships of Sauropterygia to other reptiles), a close relationship to the other extinct Mesozoic marine reptile groups Thalattosauria and Ichthyosauromorpha has been proposed, and they may also have close affinities with Archosauromorpha among living reptile groups, though this is uncertain.

Cladogram after Wang et al. 2022.

- Youngina
- - Thalattosauria
  - - Ichthyosauromorpha
    - Sauropterygiformes
      - Hanosaurus
      - - Saurosphargidae
          - Eusaurosphargis
          - - Sinosaurosphargis
            - Largocephalosaurus
        - - Helveticosaurus
          - Sauropterygia
            - - Atopodentatus
              - Placodontiformes
                - Palatodonta
                - Placodontia
            - Eosauropterygia (including Plesiosauria)

Cladogram after Wolniewicz et al. 2023:

- Sauria
  - Lepidosauromorpha
  - - Pantestudines
    - - Archosauromorpha
      - - †Thalattosauria
        - - †Ichthyosauromorpha
          - - †Helveticosaurus
            - †Sauropterygomorpha
              - - - †Eusaurosphargis
                  - †Palatodonta
                - Sauropterygia
                  - - †Atopodentatus
                    - †Placodontia
                  - - †Saurosphargidae
                      - Prosaurosphargis
                      - Largocephalosaurus
                      - Sinosaurosphargis
                    - - †Pomolispondylus
                      - - †Majiashanosaurus
                        - †Hanosaurus
                        - Eosauropterygia (including Plesiosauria)
