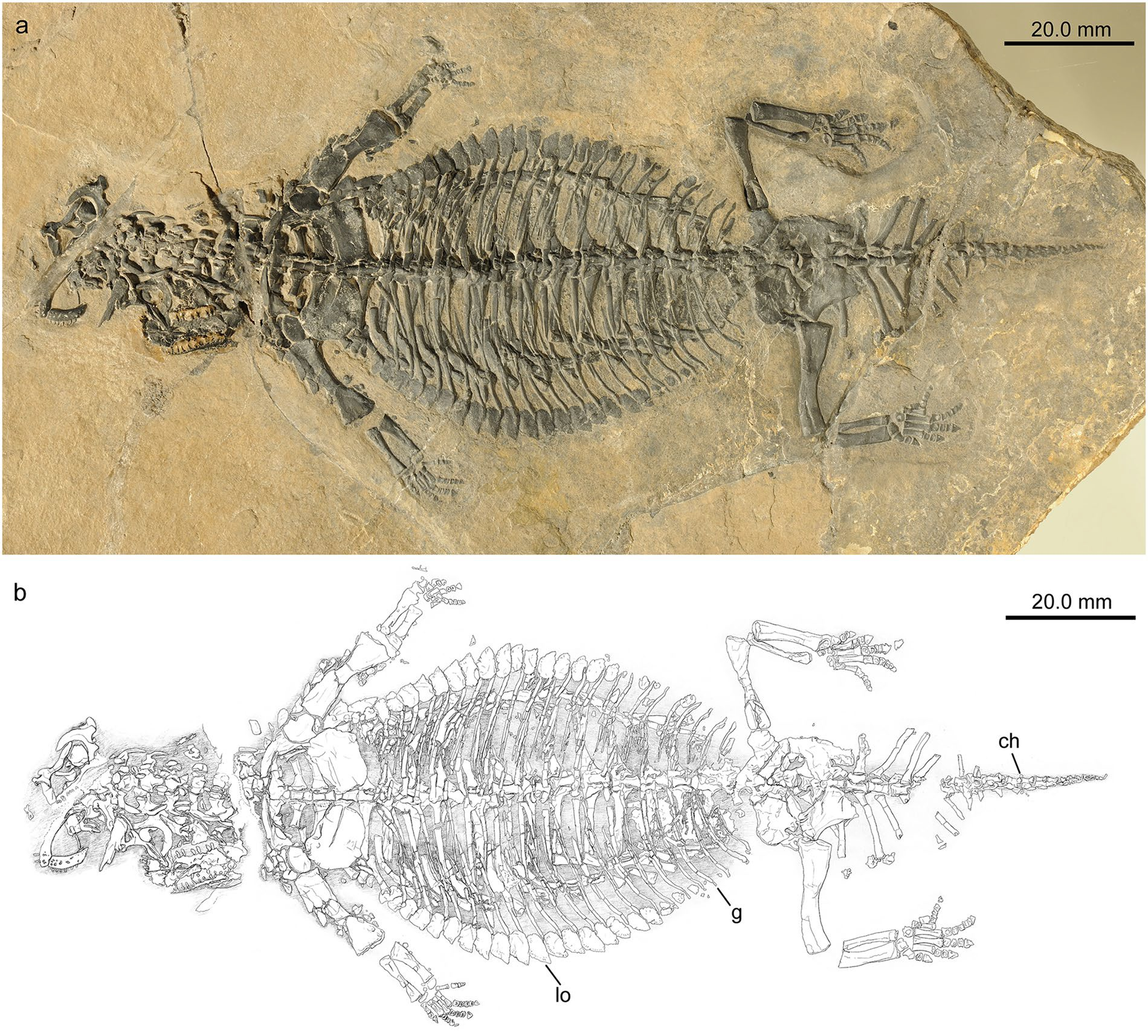
- Eusaurosphargis dalsassoi PIMUZ A/III 4380

Scientific classification
- Kingdom: Animalia
- Phylum: Chordata
- Class: Reptilia
- Clade: †Sauropterygiformes
- Genus: †Eusaurosphargis; Nosotti & Rieppel 2003
- Species: †E. dalassoi

Binomial name
- †Eusaurosphargis dalassoi Nosotti & Rieppel 2003

= Eusaurosphargis =

Eusaurosphargis Temporal range: Middle Triassic, 243–241 Ma

Extinct genus of reptiles

Eusaurosphargis is an extinct genus of a diapsid reptile, known from the Middle Triassic (Anisian and Ladinian age) Besano Formation of northern Italy and Prosanto Formation of south-eastern Switzerland. It contains a single species, Eusaurosphargis dalsassoi. It was a small reptile, measuring 20 cm (7.9 in) long.

== Discovery ==
The holotype of Eusaurosphargis dalsassoi (BES SC 390) is a partial skeleton of a single individual found disarticulated but in close association. BES SC 390 was collected from an oil shale at Cava di Besano of the Besano Formation (Grenzbitumenzone). These lagoonal beds are equivalent to those at Monte San Giorgio, dating to the Anisian-Ladinian boundary, probably to the latest Anisian at this location, of the early Middle Triassic, about 243 million years ago. Nicole Klein and Oliver J. Sichelschmidt (2014) described disarticulated remains they referred to Eusaurosphargis sp. These remains were collected from the Dutch Winterswijk Quarry III of the Vossenveld Formation, dating to the late Anisian stage.

A new, complete and almost entirely-articulated specimen was described in 2017 from Ducanfurgga, near Davos, Canton Grisons (Graubünden) in Swiss Alps (PIMUZ A/III 4380). This specimen is of a juvenile and displays extensive osteoderm armor and morphology that indicates that the animal was not aquatic as previously thought. Although a semi-aquatic lifestyle was not ruled out.

== Etymology ==
Eusaurosphargis was first described and named by Stefania Nosotti and Olivier Rieppel in 2003 and the type species is Eusaurosphargis dalsassoi. The generic name is derived from Greek eu, meaning "true/well", sauros, meaning "lizard", and sphargis, the old genus name for the leatherback turtle, in reference to the many similarities Eusaurosphargis shares with Saurosphargis, a taxon whose holotype was lost and was thus considered a mystery. Like the name of Saurosphargis itself, it also refers to Eusaurosphargis appear haveseemingly transitional traits between turtles and other reptiles. The specific name dalsassoi honors the paleontologist Cristiano Dal Sasso at the Milan Natural History Museum who was the first to realize the importance of BES SC 390.

== Phylogeny ==
Eusaurosphargis was first included in a phylogenetic analysis in its original description. Nosotti and Rieppel (2003) recovered it as the sister taxon of Helveticosaurus, and based on the description in the literature available for Saurosphargis (whose holotype is lost), they considered it to fall in the same clade. This group was found to be the sister-group of the clade that comprises thalattosauriforms and sauropterygians.

The anatomy of Saurosphargis was finally clarified by comparisons with the well-preserved specimens of Sinosaurosphargis, and as a result Saurosphargis was no longer considered to be a nomen dubium, and thus could be included in a phylogenetic analysis. Li et al. (2011) found Saurosphargis and Sinosaurosphargis to form a clade separate from that of Eusaurosphargis and Helveticosaurus, which they termed Saurosphargidae. The following cladogram is simplified after the phylogenetic analysis of Li et al. (2014), which includes Eusaurosphargis, Helveticosaurus and all known saurosphargid species. The removal / inclusion of Ichthyopterygia was found to affect the topology the most - switching the positions of the Eusaurosphargis+Helveticosaurus and Thalattosauriformes clades, and altering the positions of several taxa within Eosauropterygia, which are not shown.

- Sauria
  - Archosauromorpha
  - Lepidosauromorpha
  - Testudines
  - - Ichthyopterygia
    - - Thalattosauriformes
      - - - Helveticosaurus zollingeri
          - Eusaurosphargis dalsassoi
        - - Sauropterygia
            - Placodontia
            - Eosauropterygia
          - Saurosphargidae
            - - Largocephalosaurus polycarpon
              - Largocephalosaurus qianensis
            - - Saurosphargis volzi
              - Sinosaurosphargis yunguiensis

A later 2022 study by Wang and colleagues found Eusaurosphargis to be a member of Saurosphargidae within the Sauropterygiformes, unrelated to Helveticosaurus.

- Youngina
- - Thalattosauria
  - - Ichthyosauromorpha
    - Sauropterygiformes
      - Hanosaurus
      - - Saurosphargidae
          - Eusaurosphargis
          - - Sinosaurosphargis
            - Largocephalosaurus
        - - Helveticosaurus
          - Sauropterygia
            - - Atopodentatus
              - Placodontiformes
                - Palatodonta
                - Placodontia
            - Eosauropterygia (including Plesiosauria)

Wolniewicz et al. 2023 found a close relationship with Palatodonta.

- Sauria
  - Lepidosauromorpha
  - - Pantestudines
    - - Archosauromorpha
      - - †Thalattosauria
        - - †Ichthyosauromorpha
          - - †Helveticosaurus
            - †Sauropterygomorpha
              - - - †Eusaurosphargis
                  - †Palatodonta
                - Sauropterygia
                  - - †Atopodentatus
                    - †Placodontia
                  - - †Saurosphargidae
                      - Prosaurosphargis
                      - Largocephalosaurus
                      - Sinosaurosphargis
                    - - †Pomolispondylus
                      - - †Majiashanosaurus
                        - †Hanosaurus
                        - Eosauropterygia (including Plesiosauria)
