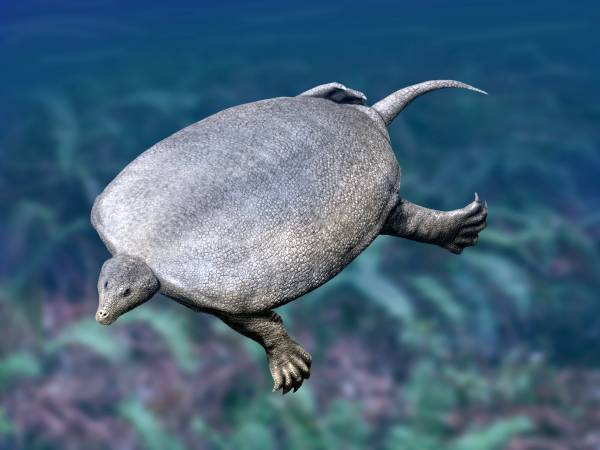
- Life reconstruction of Sinosaurosphargis

Scientific classification
- Kingdom: Animalia
- Phylum: Chordata
- Clade: †Sauropterygiformes
- Family: †Saurosphargidae; Li et al., 2011

Genera
- †Largocephalosaurus; †Prosaurosphargis; †Saurosphargis; †Sinosaurosphargis; †Eusaurosphargis?

= Saurosphargidae =

Saurosphargids Temporal range: Olenekian and Anisian, 251–243 Ma

Extinct family of reptiles

Saurosphargidae is an extinct family of marine reptiles known from the Early Triassic (Olenekian stage) and early Middle Triassic (Anisian stage) of Europe and China.

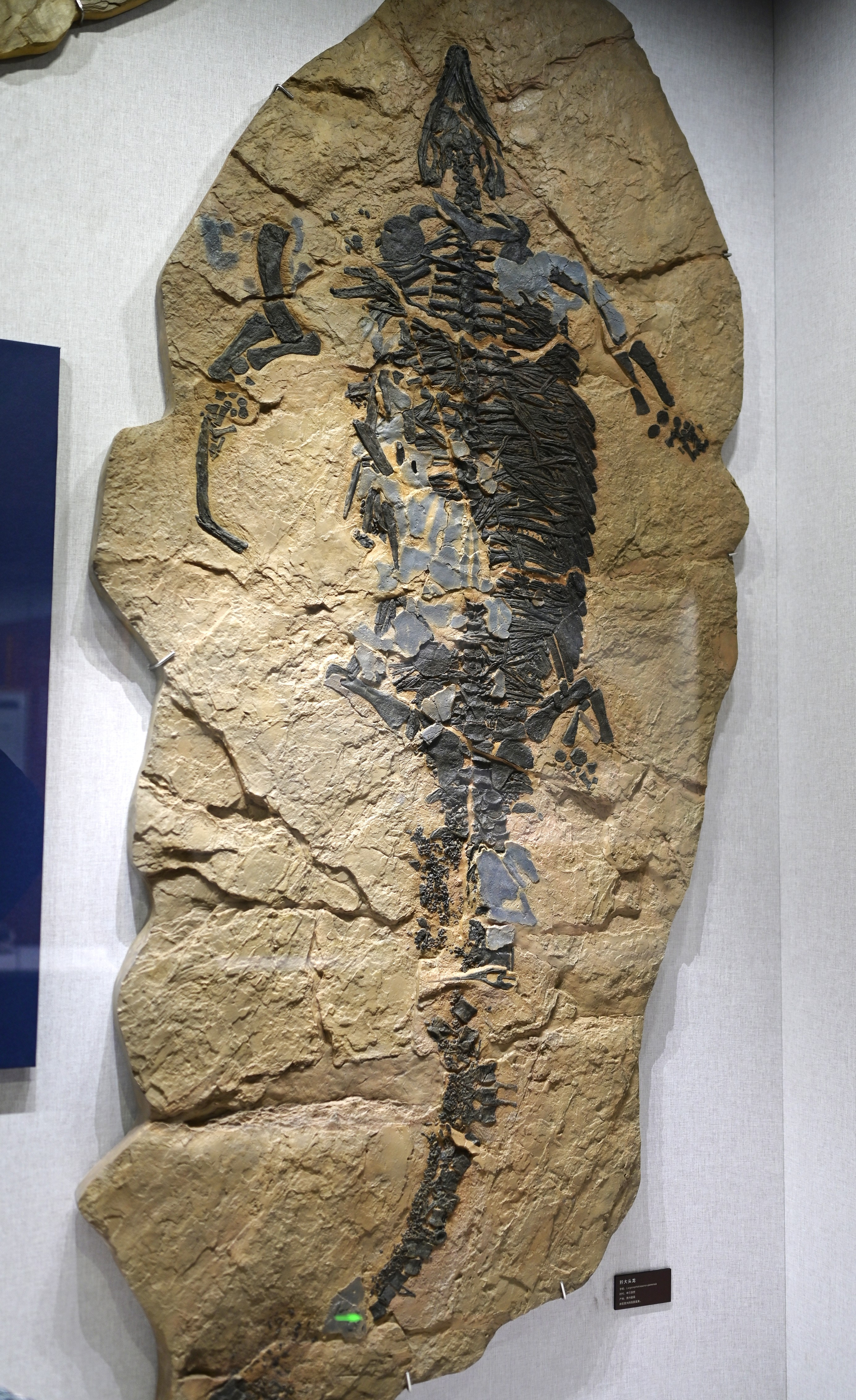
Skeleton of Largocephalosaurus

The type genus of the family is Saurosphargis, named by Friedrich von Huene in 1936 based on a single specimen collected from the lower Anisian Lower Muschelkalk of Gogolin, Poland -- a section of 12 incomplete back vertebrae with ribs. The generic name of Saurosphargis is derived from Greek sauros, "lizard," and sphargis, the old genus name for the leatherback turtle, in reference to the dorsal osteoderm "body armor" and broadened ribs forming a closed chest rib basket, traits that are seemingly transitional between turtles and other reptiles. However, due to the only known specimen' destruction during World War II, many authors considered Saurosphargis to be a nomen dubium. Nevertheless, even based on surviving descriptions alone, many differences were noted even from its closest known relative at the time, Eusaurosphargis dalsassoi from the Anisian-Ladinian boundary of the southern Alps. Various hypotheses existed for the affinities of these species, and together with Helveticosaurus, they were originally thought to be placodonts, but later studies suggested relatedness to other sauropterygians and / or ichthyopterygians.

It wasn't until nearly a century after the discovery of Saurosphargis, that other specimens closely related to it were found in China. In 2011, Li et al. described and named three of these specimens, Sinosaurosphargis yunguiensis, referring to this species being the Chinese version of Saurosphargis. The specimens of Sinosaurosphargis were collected from Member II of the Guanling Formation, dating to the Pelsonian (mid-late Anisian). Based on very detailed descriptions and figures of Saurosphargis in Huene (1936), and based on comparisons with the well-preserved Sinosauropshargis, Li et al. (2011) resurrected Saurosphargis volzi as a valid species, and erected the family Saurosphargidae to contain the two. Furthermore, they reported the discovery of material referable to Saurosphargis from the Lower Muschelkalk of Winterswijk, the Netherlands, that is under preparation. Saurosphargis and Sinosaurosphargis were included in a phylogenetic analysis, and were recovered in a monophyletic Saurosphargidae which was found to be the sister taxon of Thalattosauriformes. Sauropterygia was recovered as the sister taxon of their combined group, with a clade formed by Eusaurosphargis and Helveticosaurus in a position basal to it.

In 2014, Li et al. described a second species of Largocephalosaurus, that was initially interpreted as an eosauropterygian due to the limited preparation of the holotype of its type species L. polycarpon. The second species L. qianensis, known from three specimens, and the newly prepared portions of L. polycarpon postcranial skeleton, revealed the same osteoderm "body armor" and broadened rib basket that are unique to saurosphargids. Thus, Largocephalosaurus was reinterpreted as a saurosphargid and a phylogenetic analysis recovered both species, forming a monophyletic Largocephalosaurus, as basal to the clade formed by Saurosphargis and Sinosaurosphargis. All four known specimens of Largocephalosaurus came from the Luoping Biota, from Member II of the Guanling Formation, that yielded Sinosaurosphargis, alongside various invertebrates, fish, basal ichthyosaurs, Atopodentatus, and several species of eosauropterygian, including both pachypleurosaurs and nothosaurids.

== Phylogeny ==
The following cladogram is simplified after Li et al. (2014) phylogenetic analysis, showing interrelationships of all known Saurosphargidae species, and the placement of the clade within Sauria. Saurosphargis was coded solely based on the holotype. The removal/inclusion of Ichthyopterygia was found to affect the topology the most—switching the positions of the Eusaurosphargis + Helveticosaurus and Thalattosauriformes clades, and altering the positions of several taxa within Eosauropterygia, which are not shown.

- Sauria
  - Archosauromorpha
  - Lepidosauromorpha
  - Testudines
  - - Ichthyopterygia
    - - Thalattosauriformes
      - - - Helveticosaurus zollingeri
          - Eusaurosphargis dalsassoi
        - - Sauropterygia
            - Placodontia
            - Eosauropterygia
          - Saurosphargidae
            - - Largocephalosaurus polycarpon
              - Largocephalosaurus qianensis
            - - Saurosphargis volzi
              - Sinosaurosphargis yunguiensis

Wolniewicz et al. (2023) recovered saurosphargids nested within Sauropterygia, more closely related to eosauropterygians than to placodonts. Pomolispondylus, initially grouped with saurosphargids and together comprising the Saurosphargiformes, was instead recovered in a position diverging after saurosphargids, closer to eosauropterygians:

- Sauropterygomorpha
  - - Eusaurosphargis dalsassoi
    - Palatodonta bleekeri
  - Sauropterygia
    - - Atopodentatus unicus
      - Placodontia
    - - Saurosphargidae
        - Prosaurosphargis yingzishanensis
        - Largocephalosaurus qianensis
        - Sinosaurosphargis yunguiensis
      - - Pomolispondylus biani
        - - Majiashanosaurus discocoracoidis
          - Hanosaurus hupehensis
          - Eosauropterygia
