= Saurosphargis =

Saurosphargis Temporal range: Middle Triassic, 246 Ma

Scientific classification
- Domain: Eukaryota
- Kingdom: Animalia
- Phylum: Chordata
- Class: Reptilia
- Family: †Saurosphargidae
- Genus: †Saurosphargis; Huene, 1936

Type species
- †Saurosphargis volzi Huene, 1936

Extinct genus of reptiles

Saurosphargis is an extinct genus of a basal marine reptile, saurosphargid, known from the Middle Triassic (Anisian age) of southwestern Poland and eastern Netherlands. It contains a single species, Saurosphargis volzi.

== Discovery ==
Saurosphargis is known solely from the unnumbered holotype that was housed at the Breslaw Museum, a partial postcranial skeleton that included a section of 12 incomplete back vertebrae with ribs. The specimen collected at Gogolin, Gorny Slask of Upper Silesia, Poland, from the Chorzower Schichten horizon of the Lower Muschelkalk, dating to the early Anisian stage of the early Middle Triassic, about 246 million years ago. Rieppel (1995) described an isolated vertebra MGU Wr. 3873s housed at Institute of Geological Sciences, University of Wroclaw, that is possibly referable to Saurosphargis, collected from the same general location. The holotype was destroyed during World War II, and as a result many authors considered Saurosphargis to be a nomen dubium prior to the discovery of additional saurosphargid species, that enabled better comparisons with the detailed descriptions and figures of Saurosphargis in Huene (1936).

Paul Albers and Li et al. (2011) briefly reported the discovery of well-preserved material referable to Saurosphargis from the Lower Muschelkalk of Winterswijk, Netherlands. The material is currently under preparation.

== Etymology ==
Saurosphargis was officially named by Friedrich von Huene in 1936 and the type species is Saurosphargis volzi. The generic name is derived from Greek sauros, "lizard", and sphargis, the old genus name for the leatherback turtle, in reference to the dorsal osteoderm "body armor" and broadened ribs forming a closed chest rib basket, traits that are seemingly transitional between turtles and other reptiles. The specific name volzi honors the paleontologist Wilhelm Volz who found and briefly described the holotype of Saurosphargis and the Lower Muschelkalk of Gogolin between 1903 and 1908.

== Phylogeny ==
The following cladogram is simplified after Li et al. (2014) phylogenetic analysis, showing interrelationships of all known Saurosphargidae species, and the placement of the clade within Sauria. Saurosphargis was coded solely based on the holotype. The removal / inclusion of Ichthyopterygia was found to affect the topology the most - switching the positions of the Eusaurosphargis+Helveticosaurus and Thalattosauriformes clades, and altering the positions of several taxa within Eosauropterygia, which are not shown.

- Sauria
  - Archosauromorpha
  - Lepidosauromorpha
  - Testudines
  - - Ichthyopterygia
    - - Thalattosauriformes
      - - - Helveticosaurus zollingeri
          - Eusaurosphargis dalsassoi
        - - Sauropterygia
            - Placodontia
            - Eosauropterygia
          - Saurosphargidae
            - - Largocephalosaurus polycarpon
              - Largocephalosaurus qianensis
            - - Saurosphargis volzi
              - Sinosaurosphargis yunguiensis
