= Hanosaurus =

Hanosaurus Temporal range: Early Triassic, Olenekian

Scientific classification
- Kingdom: Animalia
- Phylum: Chordata
- Class: Reptilia
- Superorder: †Sauropterygia
- Clade: †Eosauropterygia
- Genus: †Hanosaurus; Young, 1972

Type species
- †Hanosaurus hupehensis Young, 1972

Extinct genus of reptiles

Hanosaurus is an extinct genus of marine reptiles that existed during the Triassic period in what is now China. The type species is Hanosaurus hupehensis. It was a small animal, with specimens measuring 79.4 cm (31.3 in) long in total body length, which likely fed on soft-bodied prey.

== Discovery ==
Hanosaurus (lizard of Han River) was discovered from the Sonshugo locality of Hubei, China. It was found at the second member of the Jialingjiang Formation. The type specimen consisted of a skull, complete hindlimbs and pelvis, incomplete shoulder girdle represented by coracoid and clavicle, and an articulated but incomplete vertebral column. It was initially described as a thalattosaur but subsequent research showed it was more likely to be a sauropterygia.

A more complete referred specimen was described in 2022 from the Yingzishan locality of Hubei, China. The specimen was also found at the second member of the Jialingjiang formation. It consisted of almost the entire skeleton preserved with its ventral side up. However, a later study has cast doubt on the referral of this specimen to Hanosaurus.

== Phylogenetic placement ==
Rieppel's 1998 reassessment recovered Hanosaurus within a monophyletic pachypleurosaurid in a phylogenetic analysis featuring diapsids. Its placement within Sauropterygia, however, was rather inconsistent between different subsequent studies. Some studies support Rieppel 1998's pachypleurosaur placement; some found it to be more closely related to Nothosauridae than other pachypleurosaurs; some found it to be the sister taxon to a clade consisted of Nothosauridae and Pachypleurosauridae; some found it to be the sister taxon to eosauropterygia; while some recovered it to be a basal sauropterygia or outside of Sauropterygia altogether.

A 2024 study by Hu, Li & Liu recovered Hanosaurus as the sister taxon of the clade formed by the Nothosauroidea and the Pachypleurosauria. The results of their phylogenetic analyses are shown in the cladogram below:

- Sauropterygia
  - Placodus
  - Eosauropterygia
    - Pistosauridae
    - - Majiashanosaurus
      - - Hanosaurus
        - - Nothosauroidea
          - Pachypleurosauria

== Taxonomy ==
Rieppel (1998) diagnosed Hanosaurus as a small pachypluerosaurid with the following features:

1. Nasal bigger than frontal
2. Frontal fused in adults
3. Pineal foramen placed more anteriorly
4. Pubis and ischium with rounded edge, no thyroid fenestra

Following the description of the referred specimen and the placement of the taxon being the most basal sauropterygiform (a clade that includes sauropterygia, Helveticosaurus, and Saurosphargidae), Wang et al. (2022) diagnosed Hanosaurus as a medium sized sauropterygiform with the following characteristics:

1. Snout without constriction
2. Supratemporal fenestra smaller than orbits
3. Nasals longer than frontals
4. Mandibular articulation far posterior to the occiput, with retroarticular process well developed
5. Anterior teeth short and conical
6. Posterior teeth constricted at the base, with the lingual surface of tooth crown slightly concave
7. Cervical ribs with anterior process
8. Dorsal ribs pachyostotic
9. Coracoid not waisted (Note: The holotype has a waisted coracoid)
10. Pubis extremely round
11. Ischium kidney shaped
12. No distinctive thyroid fenestra between pubis and ischium
13. Minimally four carpals and three tarsals

Wolniewicz et al. (2023), however, pointed out the difference between coracoid morphology between the referred specimen and the holotype, with the former having a circular shape and the latter having a waisted shape similar to that of other sauropterygias. They also pointed out that the referred specimen and holotype were not recovered as sister taxon to each other in their phylogenetic analyses. If this is correct, then the previous diagnosis can no longer be used as it's partly based on the referred specimen. They instead suggested that the referred specimen might be that of "Lariosaurus" sanxiaensis, a larger sauropterygia from the same formation based on similar coracoid morphology.

== Lifestyle (Based on the referred specimen) ==
Despite being a basal sauropterygian, Hanosaurus probably did not go on land frequently and was mostly aquatic based on features such as pachyostoic ribs and reduced pelvis that likely could not support it on land.

Wang et al. (2022) suggested that Hanosaurus was an axial swimmer based on its longer trunk and smaller limbs compared to other sauropterygias, which were generally considered to be paraxial swimmers. The speculation about its lifestyle was mostly based on the referred specimen, which as noted by the section above might belong to another species.

== Environment and associated fauna ==
Hanosaurus was found in the second member of the Jialingjiang Formation, which was suggested to represent a lagoon deposit close to sea based on the way water depth changed between localities.

Hanosaurus was part of the Nanzhang-Yuan'an fauna. The fauna also contained other sauropterygians ("Lariosaurus" sanxiaensis, Keichousaurus yunnanensis, and an unnamed large eosauropterygian), Saurosphargidae (Pomolispondylus and Prosaurosphargis), ichthyosaur (Chaohusaurus zhangjiawanensis), and hupesuchias (Hupehsuchus, Nanchangosaurus, Parahupehsuchus, Eohupehsuchus, and Eretmorhipis), the last of which was only present in this faunal assemblage. Not much is known about the ecology of Hanosaurus, although small pachypleurosaurs were suggested to be small invertebrate predators based on jaw musculatures.
