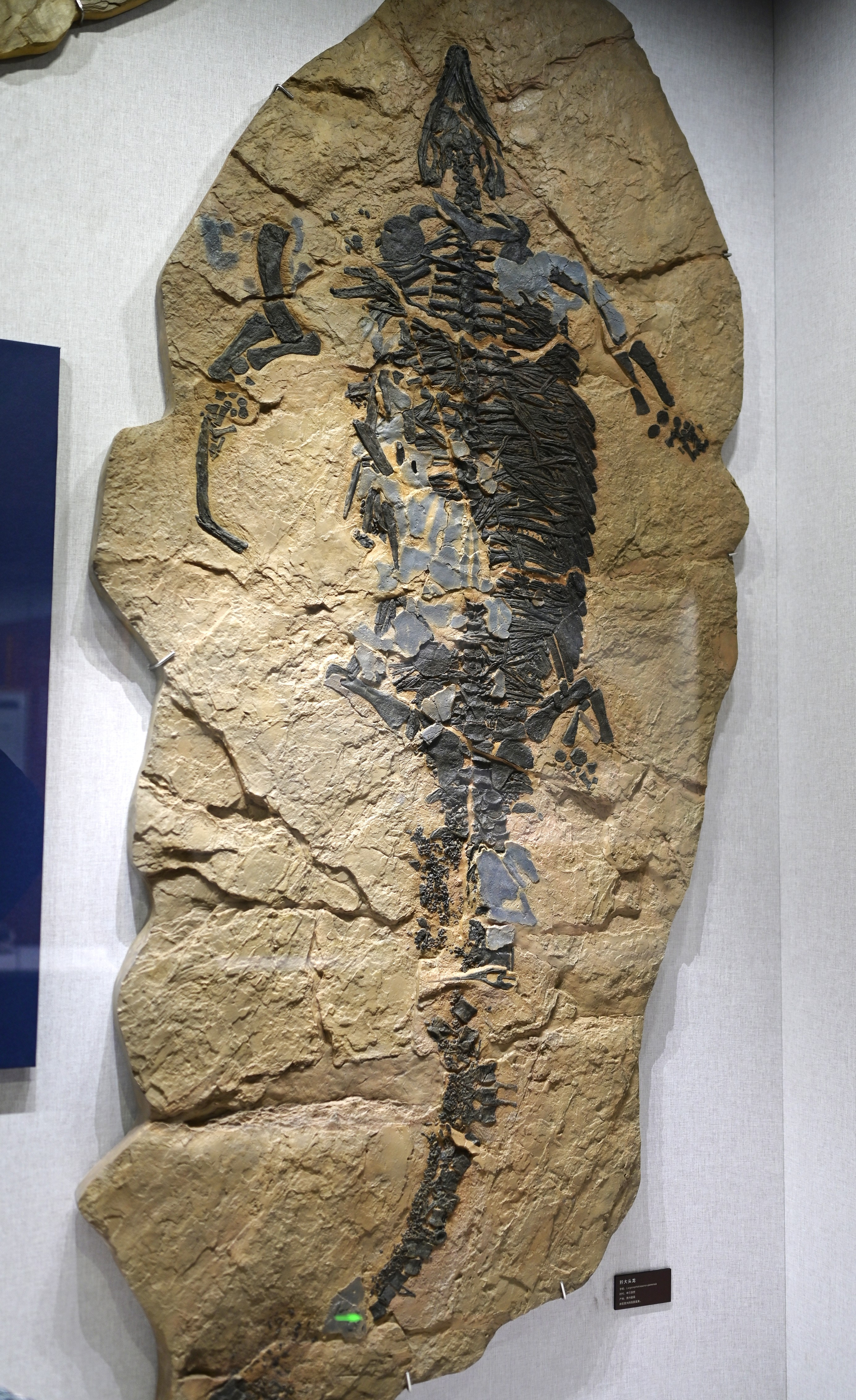
- Cast of L. qianensis holotype skeleton (IVPP V15638), Baoding Natural History Museum

Scientific classification
- Kingdom: Animalia
- Phylum: Chordata
- Family: †Saurosphargidae
- Genus: †Largocephalosaurus; Cheng et al., 2012

Type species
- †Largocephalosaurus polycarpon Cheng et al., 2012

Species
- †L. polycarpon Cheng et al., 2012 (type); †L. qianensis Li et al., 2014

= Largocephalosaurus =

Largocephalosaurus Temporal range: Middle Triassic, 243 Ma

Extinct genus of reptiles

Largocephalosaurus is an extinct genus of basal saurosphargid, a marine reptile known from the Middle Triassic (Anisian age) Guanling Formation of Yunnan and Guizhou Provinces, southwestern China. It contains a type species, Largocephalosaurus polycarpon, and a second species L. qianensis.

L. polycarpon was initially interpreted as an eosauropterygian sauropterygian closely related to European pachypleurosaurs and nothosaurids. However following additional preparation of the postcranial skeleton and the discovery of a second better known species L. qianensis, Li et al. (2014) reinterpreted Largocephalosaurus as a basal member of the family Saurosphargidae and a close relative of Saurosphargis and Sinosaurosphargis. According to Li et al. (2014), saurosphargids did not belong to Sauropterygia, although they were closely related to it, forming its sister taxon.

== Discovery ==
The type species of Largocephalosaurus, L. polycarpon is known only from the holotype WIGM SPC V 1009 a nearly complete and articulated skull and skeleton missing most of its tail and measuring more than 113 centimetres (3.71 ft) in length, housed at the Wuhan Institute of Geology and Mineral Recourses. SPC V 1009 was collected from Member II of the Guanling Formation, dating to the Pelsonian substage of the mid-late Anisian stage of the early Middle Triassic, about 243 million years ago, at Luoping County of Yunnan Province.

While L. polycarpon was being studied at the WIGM, three specimens of what was later named L. qianensis were prepared at the Geological Museum of Peking University and the Institute of Vertebrate Paleontology and Paleoanthropology. These three specimens were collected in 2008 about 100 km northeast of the type locality of L. polycarpon at Xinmin District of Panxian County, southwestern Guizhou Province. They, like SPC V 1009, came from Member II of the Guanling Formation, dating to the late Anisian. Out of these specimens, IVPP V 15638, a nearly complete skeleton exposed in view from below with only the back of the tail missing, was chosen to represent the holotype of L. qianensis. The other two specimen are referable to L. qianensis and include GMPKU-P-1532-A, a skull with a neck vertebra in view from above, and GMPKU-P-1532-B, an incomplete postcranial skeleton in view from above, with the back portion of the mandible preserved, but missing most of the tail.

All specimens of Largocephalosaurus came from the Lagerstätte discovered during a 2007 geological mapping project with a diverse record of marine life called Luoping Biota, that yielded, apart from Largocephalosaurus, various invertebrates, fish, basal ichthyosaurs, Atopodentatus, the advanced saurosphargid Sinosaurosphargis, and several species of eosauropterygian, including both pachypleurosaurs and nothosaurids.

== Etymology ==
Largocephalosaurus was first described and named by Long Cheng, Xiaohong Chen, Xiongwei Zeng and Yongjian Cai in 2012 with the type species Largocephalosaurus polycarpon. The generic name is said to be derived from Latin largus, meaning "large", and cephalus, meaning "head", and from Greek sauros, meaning "lizard", a common suffix for genus names of extinct reptiles. In classical Latin, the proper word for "head" is caput, while in ancient Greek kephalē (κεφαλή) was used for "head". Kephalos (Κέφαλος) was the first name of various Greek mythological and historical figures that was rendered in Latin as Cephalus. The specific name polycarpon is said to be derived from Latin poly, meaning "many", plus "carpon", meaning "ossified carpals", in reference to the eleven carpal ossifications the forelimb of L. polycarpon shows, resulting in the unique hand bone formula of 2-3-4-5-5. In classical Latin the proper word for "many" is multus, while in ancient Greek they used the word polys (πολύς).

A second species L. qianensis was named by Chun Li, Da-Yong Jiang, Long Cheng, Xiao-Chun Wu and Olivier Rieppel in 2014. Its specific name is derived from Qian, a shortened alternative spelling for Guizhou, plus the Latin suffix -ensis meaning "from", in reference to the different occurrence of the species - while the specimens of L. qianensis were discovered in Guizhou Province, the only known specimen of L. polycarpon came from the neighboring Yunnan Province.

== Description ==
Largocephalosaurus was a relatively large saurosphargid, with the type specimen of the second species L. qianensis measuring up to 2.317 m (7.60 ft) in total body length. (Note: The skull measures 15.7 cm (0.5 ft) long and the preserved postcranial skeleton measures 2.16 m (7.1 ft) long, so the sum of these length estimates result in 2.317 m (7.60 ft) for the total body length.) It is a basal saurosphargid, less modified morphologically from the archetypal diapsid reptile compared to advanced saurosphargids like Sinosaurosphargis. However, even in its original description that interpreted it as an eosauropterygian sauropterygian, several traits later identified as saurosphargid were noted. These include back vertebrae that show elongated, distally expanded transverse projections, and its broadened and flattened chest ribs. Yet, Largocephalosaurus unlike other saurosphargids retains an elongate body shape, a well-developed supratemporal fenestra, an oval suborbital fenestra (although much reduced compared to non-saurosphargids) and an incomplete dorsal osteoderm carapace. Additionally, the advanced saurosphargids Saurosphargis and Sinosaurosphargis have broader and flatter rib baskets, and also transverse projections of back vertebrae and proximal portions of chest ribs that are much more robust than in Largocephalosaurus, being much wider than the spacing between them. Other differences include: the presence of three or four teeth on the premaxilla, and its exclusion from the external nostril outline; an elongated frontal bone back-side facing projection; the presence of a row of large osteoderms on the top of the neural spines, in the midline of the partial osteoderm shield; and similarly rounded coracoid and pubis bone with the coracoid foramen and the obturator fenestra present and open (respectively).

Due to the fact that the holotype skeleton of L. polycarpon is still only partially prepared, Li et al. (2014) refrained from providing a revised description for it. Nevertheless, at least 9 morphological differences from the second the species L. qianensis were observed. These include the paired parietal bone, the large pineal foramen, the oval eye-sockets, and the presence of 33 presacral vertebrae (9 neck and 24 back vertebrae) and two sacral vertebrae, in L. qianensis. Additionally, a distinct palatal fossa exists on the upper surface of palatine bone in L. qianensis, and the retroarticular process is very short. The back osteoderms of L. qianensis are elongated granular in shape, and covering the sides of body. Finally, its shoulder portion of the chest ribs is broadened in a hook-like projection, while lacking the crest on its upper surface like the one seen in L. polycarpon.

== Phylogeny ==
Largocephalosaurus was first included in a phylogenetic analysis in its original description. Due to the lack of preparation of the holotype, especially of the postcranial portion, and the fact that no other saurosphargids or stem sauropterygians (like Eusaurosphargis and Helveticosaurus) were included, L. polycarpon was recovered in a position most closely related to Wumengosaurus within Eosauropterygia, basal to the European pachypleurosaurs and nothosaurids. However, following additional preparation of the postcranial skeleton and the discovery of a second better known species L. qianensis, Li et al. (2014) presented an analysis which includes Eusaurosphargis, Helveticosaurus and all known saurosphargid species. The following cladogram is simplified after their results. The removal / inclusion of Ichthyopterygia was found to affect the topology the most - switching the positions of the Eusaurosphargis+Helveticosaurus and Thalattosauriformes clades, and altering the positions of several taxa within Eosauropterygia, which are not shown.

- Sauria
  - Archosauromorpha
  - Lepidosauromorpha
  - Testudines
  - - Ichthyopterygia
    - - Thalattosauriformes
      - - - Helveticosaurus zollingeri
          - Eusaurosphargis dalsassoi
        - - Sauropterygia
            - Placodontia
            - Eosauropterygia
          - Saurosphargidae
            - - Largocephalosaurus polycarpon
              - Largocephalosaurus qianensis
            - - Saurosphargis volzi
              - Sinosaurosphargis yunguiensis
