= Sinosaurosphargis =

Sinosaurosphargis Temporal range: Middle Triassic, 243 Ma
- S. yunguiensis, Shanghai Natural History Museum

Scientific classification
- Kingdom: Animalia
- Phylum: Chordata
- Class: Reptilia
- Family: †Saurosphargidae
- Genus: †Sinosaurosphargis; Li et al., 2011

Type species
- †Sinosaurosphargis yunguiensis Li et al., 2011

Extinct genus of reptiles

Sinosaurosphargis is an extinct genus of basal marine saurosphargid reptile known from the Middle Triassic Guanling Formation of Yunnan and Guizhou Provinces, southwestern China. It contains a single species, Sinosaurosphargis yunguiensis.

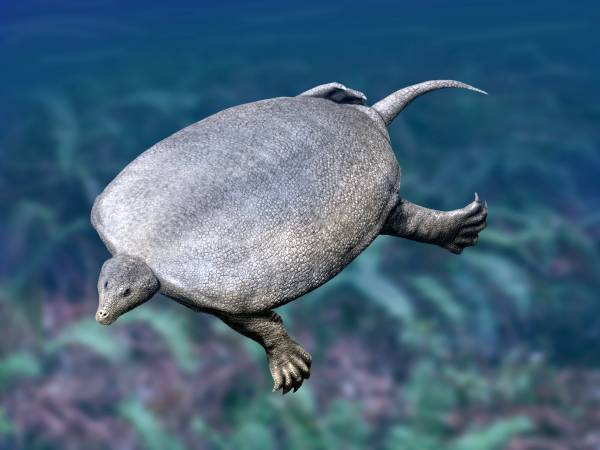
Life reconstruction of Sinosaurophargis yunguiensis

== Discovery ==
Saurosphargis is known from several individuals, all of which were collected from Member II of the Guanling Formation, dating to the Pelsonian substage of the latest Anisian stage of the early Middle Triassic, about 243 million years ago. The holotype IVPP V 17040 and paratype IVPP V 16076 are housed at the Institute of Vertebrate Paleontology and Paleoanthropology in Beijing, and represent a nearly complete articulated skeleton and skull, and a partial disarticulated postcranial skeleton including dorsal vertebra, ribs, with osteoderms and gastral rib fragments, respectively. ZMNH M 8797, an incomplete postcranial skeleton showing a very well preserved right forelimb housed at the Zhejiang Museum of Nature History of Hangzhou, was also referred to Saurosphargis in its original description. The holotype and ZMNH M 8797 were collected at Yangmazhai of Luoping County, Yunnan Province, while the paratype came from Yangjian of Pan County, Guizhou Province. An additional uncatalogued LPV specimen was also referred to S. yunguiensis. These specimens all came from the Lagerstätte discovered during a 2007 geological mapping project with a diverse record of marine life called Luoping Biota, that yielded, apart from Sinosaurosphargis, various invertebrates, fish, basal ichthyosaurs, Atopodentatus, the basal saurosphargid Largocephalosaurus, and several species of eosauropterygian, including both pachypleurosaurs and nothosaurids.

== Etymology ==
Sinosaurosphargis was first described and named by Chun Li, Olivier Rieppel, Xiao-Chun Wu, Li-Jun Zhao and Li-Ting Wang in 2011 and the type species is Sinosaurosphargis yunguiensis. The generic name is derived from Greek sino, meaning "China", sauros, meaning "lizard", and sphargis, the old genus name for the leatherback turtle, (in reference to the many similarities Sinosaurosphargis shares with Saurosphargis, a taxon whose holotype was lost and was thus considered a mystery), following the pattern of Sinosauropteryx. Like the name of Saurosphargis itself, it also refers to Sinosaurosphargis' dorsal osteoderm "body armor" and broadened ribs forming a closed chest rib basket - traits which are seemingly transitional between turtles and other reptiles. The specific name yunguiensis is derived from the names of the neighboring Yunnan and Guizhou Provinces, where the fossils were found.

== Description ==
Sinosaurosphargis was a small reptile, measuring 70–80 cm (2.3–2.6 ft) long without the missing tail. It is a basal marine reptile, closely related to Saurosphargis from the Lower Muschelkalk of southwestern Poland and eastern Netherlands. Sinosaurosphargis possesses retracted external nostrils, and shows closed upper temporal fenestrae, and a ventrally open cheek. Its trunk region is short and rounded, and covered by a shield composed of small osteoderms, just like its neck and the proximal portions of all four limbs. Its back vertebrae show elongated, distally expanded transverse projections. The chest ribs are broadened and flat, contacting one another along their length, and forming a closed chest rib basket. Li et al. (2014) found some of these traits to be shared with all saurosphargids, while others are exclusive to Saurosphargis and Sinosaurosphargis. These genera have broader and flatter rib baskets than basal saurosphargids like Largocephalosaurus, and also transverse projections of back vertebrae and proximal portions of chest ribs that are much more robust, being much wider than the spacing between them.

== Phylogeny ==
The following cladogram is simplified after the phylogenetic analysis of Li et al. (2011) and shows the placement of Sinosaurosphargis within Sauria. Ichthyopterygia was removed from the tree, as it caused a less resolved topology. Saurosphargis was coded solely based on the holotype, as the Netherlands material remains unprepared.

- - Lepidosauromorpha
  - - Testudines
      - Odontochelys
      - - Proganochelys
        - Chelydra
    - - - Helveticosaurus
        - Eusaurosphargis
      - - Sauropterygia
          - Placodontia
          - Eosauropterygia
        - - - Thalattosauriformes
            - Saurosphargidae
              - Saurosphargis
              - Sinosaurosphargis

Li et al. (2014) presented an updated version of the analysis above, showing interrelationships of all known Saurosphargidae species. The removal / inclusion of Ichthyopterygia was found to affect the topology the most - switching the positions of the Eusaurosphargis+Helveticosaurus and Thalattosauriformes clades, and altering the positions of several taxa within Eosauropterygia, which are not shown.

- Sauria
  - Archosauromorpha
  - Lepidosauromorpha
  - Testudines
  - - Ichthyopterygia
    - - Thalattosauriformes
      - - - Helveticosaurus zollingeri
          - Eusaurosphargis dalsassoi
        - - Sauropterygia
            - Placodontia
            - Eosauropterygia
          - Saurosphargidae
            - - Largocephalosaurus polycarpon
              - Largocephalosaurus qianensis
            - - Saurosphargis volzi
              - Sinosaurosphargis yunguiensis
