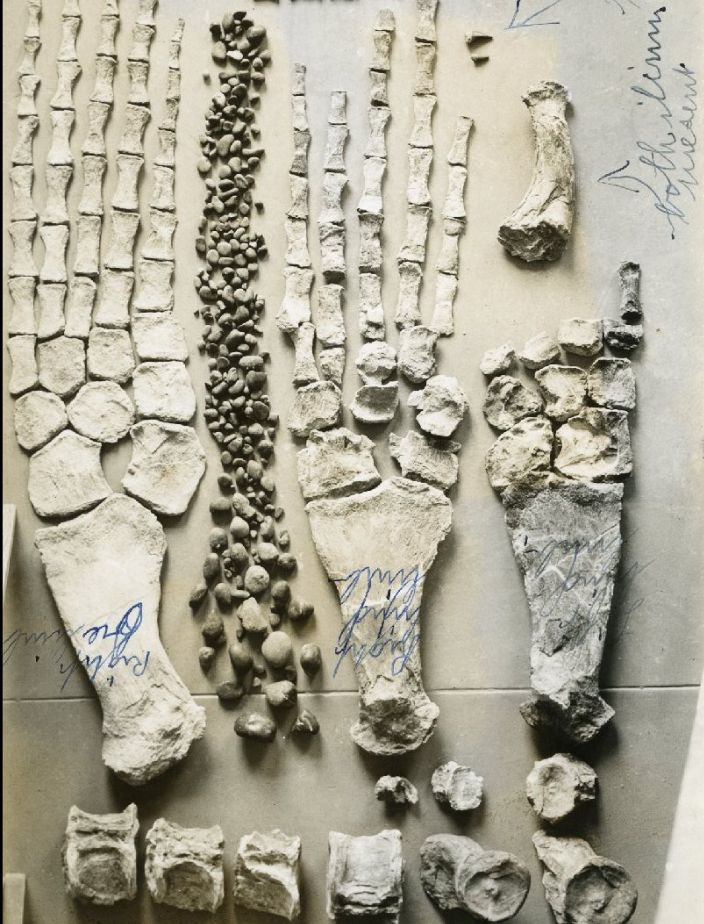
- Some elements of the Plesioelasmosaurus holotype

Scientific classification
- Kingdom: Animalia
- Phylum: Chordata
- Class: Reptilia
- Superorder: †Sauropterygia
- Order: †Plesiosauria
- Superfamily: †Plesiosauroidea
- Family: †Elasmosauridae
- Genus: †Plesioelasmosaurus; Schumacher & Everhart, 2022
- Species: †P. walkeri

Binomial name
- †Plesioelasmosaurus walkeri Schumacher & Everhart, 2022

= Plesioelasmosaurus =

Plesioelasmosaurus Temporal range: Late Cretaceous, 94.3–89.3 Ma

Genus of elasmosaurid plesiosaurs

Plesioelasmosaurus is an extinct genus of elasmosaurid plesiosaur from the Late Cretaceous (middle Cenomanian) Greenhorn Limestone of Kansas, United States. The genus contains a single species, P. walkeri, known from a partial skeleton.

== Discovery and naming ==
The holotype specimen, UNSM 50134, was discovered by Joe Purzer, an oil field geologist, in 1931 near the town of Holyrood, Kansas. He notified George F. Sternberg and Myrl Vincent Walker, and the excavation of the specimen commenced later in the year. It was collected over a period of ten days in October 1931.

The specimen became known as the 'Holyrood elasmosaur' and was eventually sold to the University of Nebraska State Museum in 1935, where it was prepared and placed into storage. Everhart (2007) noted that Harold Ehler used photographs of the holotype to identify the type locality, but no further remains of Plesioelasmosaurus resulted from Ehler's discovery.

The holotype consists of both ilia, partial hind paddles, a nearly complete fore paddle, vertebrae from all sections of the vertebral column (cervical, 'pectoral', dorsal, sacral, and caudal), ribs and gastralia, two teeth, and more than two hundred gastroliths, all from a single individual. One of these front paddles is still on display at the UNSM today.

In 2022, Plesioelasmosaurus walkeri was described as a new genus and species of elasmosaurid plesiosaur by Schumacher & Everhart based on these remains.The generic name, "Plesioelasmosaurus", is derived from the Greek words "plesios", meaning "near to", "elasmos" meaning "metal plate", and "sauros", meaning "lizard". The specific name, "walkeri", honors paleontologist Myrl Walker, one of the collectors of the holotype.

== Description ==
Life restoration

A photograph of a front flipper of Plesioelasmosaurus, taken in the 1930s by George F. Sternberg, was captioned as belonging to "a large plesiosaur, which would have measured from 40 to 60 feet in length" (12.2 to 18.3 m). According to Everhart (2007), Plesioelasmosaurus was a "large [...] elasmosaur", but no further size estimates were given.

== Classification ==
Schumacher & Everhart (2022) confidently identified Plesioelasmosaurus as a basal member of the Elasmosauridae.
