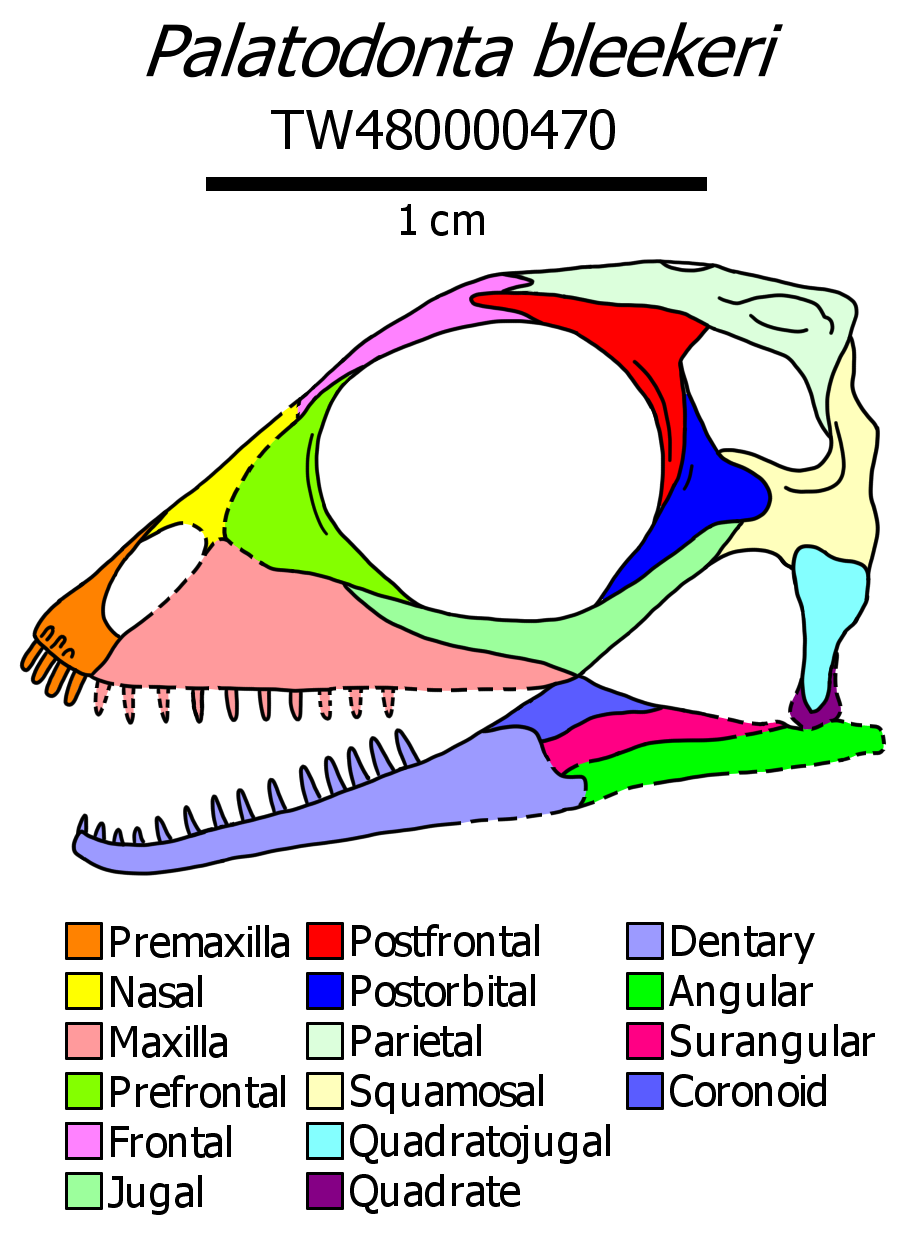
- Skull diagram

Scientific classification
- Kingdom: Animalia
- Phylum: Chordata
- Class: Reptilia
- Superorder: †Sauropterygia
- Clade: †Placodontiformes
- Genus: †Palatodonta; Neenan et al., 2013

Type species
- †Palatodonta bleekeri Neenan et al., 2013

= Palatodonta =

Palatodonta Temporal range: Middle Triassic, 246 Ma

Extinct genus of reptiles

Palatodonta is an extinct genus of neodiapsid reptile known from the early Middle Triassic (early Anisian stage) of the Netherlands. It was initially described in 2013 as a basal placodontiform closely related to a group of marine reptiles called placodonts, characterized by their crushing teeth and shell-like body armor. Under this interpretation, Palatodonta is transitional between placodonts and less specialized reptiles. Like placodonts, it has a row of large teeth on its palate, but while these teeth are thick and blunt in placodonts, Palatodonta has palatal teeth that are thin and pointed (like the teeth that line the jaws of most other reptiles). A 2023 study instead classified it as a sauropterygomorph and the sister taxon to Eusaurosphargis. In other words, it is close to, but not within, Sauropterygia (the group containing placodonts and other marine reptiles such as nothosaurs and plesiosaurs).

== Discovery ==
Palatodonta was first named by James M. Neenan, Nicole Klein and Torsten M. Scheyer in 2013 and the type species is Palatodonta bleekeri. The generic name refers to the row of teeth on the palatine bone of the palate. The specific name honours Remco Bleeker, an amateur paleontologist, who discovered the fossil in the summer of 2010 at the Silbeco quarry near Winterswijk. Palatodonta is known from the holotype TW480000470, a well-preserved skull of a juvenile individual.

== Description ==
The skull is tall and has a short, blunt snout. The premaxillae have a long and narrow upper branch extending between the nares (nostril holes), which are large and elliptical. Each premaxilla has four large and chisel-shaped teeth which are slightly procumbent (leaning forwards), similar to many placodonts. The teeth are strongly attached via long roots. The small size of the premaxilla and the rather anterior position of the nares are more similar to Eusarosphargis and terrestrial reptiles rather than most sauropterygians. The maxillae are only partially preserved, forming much of the rear edge of the nares. Maxillary teeth are sharp, narrow, and slightly curved, unlike the plate-like teeth of placodonts. Six teeth were present in the right maxilla as originally preserved, though more were likely present in life. The nasal bones are incomplete, but they appear to have bordered the rear and inner portion of the nares. The orbit (eye socket) was very large and circular. Its front edge was formed by a large prefrontal, and Palatodonta appears to lack a lacrimal bone. The frontals form the front half of the orbit's upper edge. The lower edge of the orbit was bordered by a slender two-pronged jugal. This "boomerang-shaped" jugal is similar in shape to that of Paraplacodus; unlike Paraplacodus, it is large enough to exclude the maxilla from the rim of the orbit.

The temporal region (behind the orbit) has two large openings: an upper temporal fenestra which is encircled by bone, and a lower temporal excavation which is open from below. This form of modified diapsid skull is common in early sauropterygians (including Paraplacodus) as well as modern lizards. The upper rear part of the skull roof is composed of the parietals, which enclose a large parietal foramen and each possess a convex bulge in their outer rear portion. Two large curved bones separate the orbit from the upper temporal fenestra: the postfrontal and postorbital. The postorbital sends back a rounded plate; this plate makes up part of the postorbital bridge, a bony bar which separates the two temporal openings. The postorbital bridge is set relatively low on the skull, so that both temporal openings are well-exposed from the side. The jugal also contributes to the postorbital bridge, as well as the front edge of the lower temporal opening. It extends back far enough to contact the large and complex squamosal, thus excluding the postorbital bone from the lower temporal opening. The tendency of the jugal to contact both the prefrontal and squamosal is a trait only shared with Placodus among placodonts. The rear edge of the lower temporal opening is formed by a tall and narrow bone. This bone was originally identified as a quadrate, which would have articulated with the lower jaw. An alternative interpretation considers it to be a reduced quadratojugal, which was previously reported as absent in Palatodonta and basal placodonts.

Micro-CT scanning of the specimen reveals more details of the jaw and internal structures of the skull. The mandible was much more slender than in placodonts, though the rear part is not fully preserved. The dentary has at least 14 pointed teeth which are sharp and narrow, though they become larger and more robust further back in the jaw. The rear of the jaw includes a low coronoid, a thin surangular, and an elongated angular which likely contains the jaw joint. The palatine bone, which lies along the palate (roof of the mouth) parallel to the maxilla, hosted a single row of large teeth similar to those of the maxilla. This is a specialization relative to most other reptiles, which lack palatine teeth or have multiple rows of tiny denticles. Placodonts are another exception with a single row of large teeth on their palatine, though their teeth are broad and plate-like. Other fragments of palate bones, such as the vomer and pterygoid, lack teeth or denticles. The only preserved portion of the braincase is a basisphenoid, the bone which connects the base of the braincase to the palate. The basisphenoid has two holes for each internal carotid artery as well as stout vertical prongs. Various disarticulated phalanges (finger bones) are mixed up with the skull.
