= Prosaurosphargis =

Prosaurosphargis Temporal range: Olenekian

Scientific classification
- Kingdom: Animalia
- Phylum: Chordata
- Class: Reptilia
- Family: †Saurosphargidae
- Genus: †Prosaurosphargis; Wolniewicz et al., 2023
- Species: †P. yingzishanensis

Binomial name
- †Prosaurosphargis yingzishanensis Wolniewicz et al., 2023

Extinct genus of reptiles

Prosaurosphargis is an extinct genus of saurosphargid from the Olenekian of China. It contains the species Prosaurosphargis yingzishanensis.
