= Atopodentatus =

Atopodentatus Temporal range: Anisian
- Skull (IVPP V20291)

Scientific classification
- Kingdom: Animalia
- Phylum: Chordata
- Class: Reptilia
- Clade: †Sauropterygiformes
- Superorder: †Sauropterygia
- Genus: †Atopodentatus; Cheng et al., 2014

Type species
- †Atopodentatus unicus Cheng et al., 2014

Extinct genus of reptiles

Atopodentatus is an extinct genus of basal sauropterygian known from the early Middle Triassic (Anisian) of Guanling Formation in Luoping County, Yunnan Province, southwestern China. It contains a single species, Atopodentatus unicus. It is thought to have lived between 247 and 240 million years ago, during the Middle Triassic period, about six million years after the Permian extinction. Atopodentatus was a herbivorous marine reptile, although marine reptiles are usually omnivores or carnivores.

A near-complete skeleton along with a left lateral portion of the skull was discovered near Daaozi village, Yunnan, China. The scientific name derives from the peculiar zipper-shaped morphology of the holotype specimen's jaws and unique dentition. However, two fossil skulls discovered in 2016 indicate that the holotype skull was badly damaged, and that the living animal actually had a hammer-shaped head with shovel-like jaws.

== Discovery and naming ==
The genus name Atopodentatus is derived from the Ancient Greek atopos (άτοπος), meaning "unusual", (Note: Compare "atopic".) combined with Latin dentatus, "toothed", referring to the unusual arrangement and shape of the teeth. The specific name "unicus" is also in reference to its unique anatomy.

== Description ==
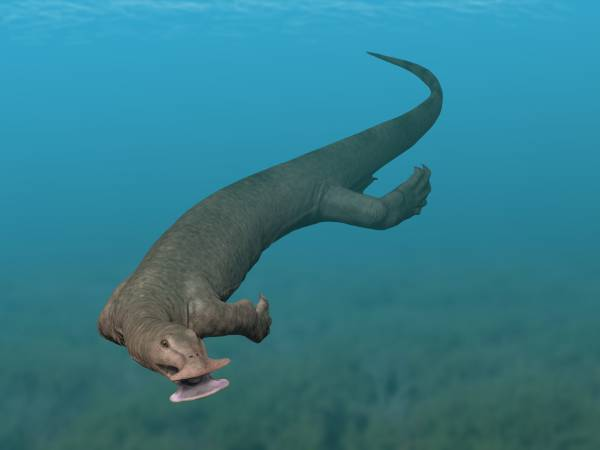
Restoration

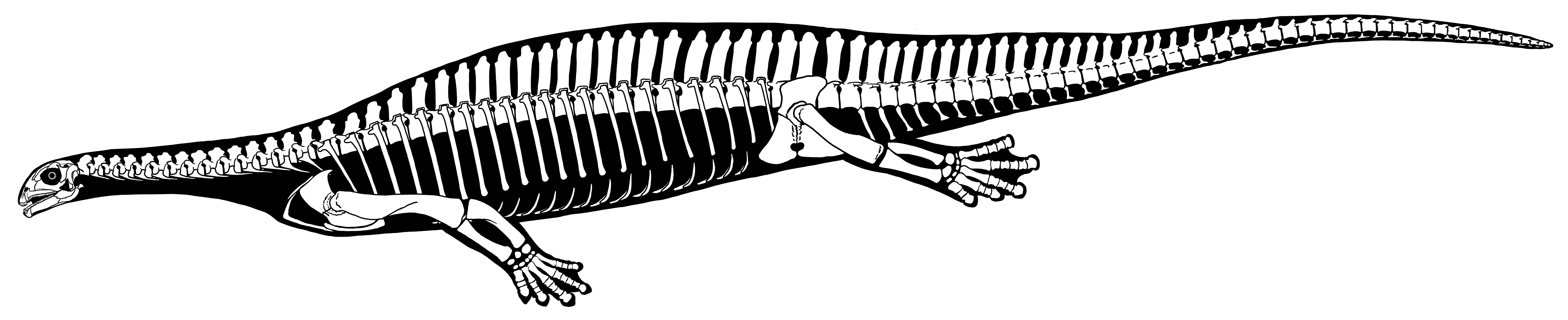
Skeletal diagram

Size comparison to a human

Atopodentatus was a medium-sized reptile measuring about 2.75 m (9.0 ft) long. The geological strata in which the fossil was found, the elongated body, reduced neck, robust appendages and hips of Atopodentatus all suggest that the animal was probably semi-aquatic in nature.

Originally, the upper mandible of Atopodentatus was believed to have small teeth running along the jawline, and then up along a vertical split in the middle of the upper jaw. This gave the upper jaw the appearance of a "zipper smile of little teeth". The upper jaw was believed to have hooked downwards. Discoveries in 2016, however, overthrew these findings, and revealed that Atopodentatus actually had a hammer-shaped head, with a bank of chisel-shaped teeth, that was useful in rooting the seabed for food.

== Palaeoecology ==
Due to its bizarre dentition, Atopodentatus was formerly considered to be a filter feeder which fed on invertebrates along the sea-bottom. It was suggested that the morphology made Atopodentatus "capable of walking on land or tidal flats and sandy islands in the intertidal zone". However, the 2016 findings reveal that Atopodentatus actually ate algae which it used its jaws to scrape off of the seabed, which was then sucked into the mouth and filtered using the needle-like teeth.
