= Marine reptile =

Aquatically secondarily adapted reptiles

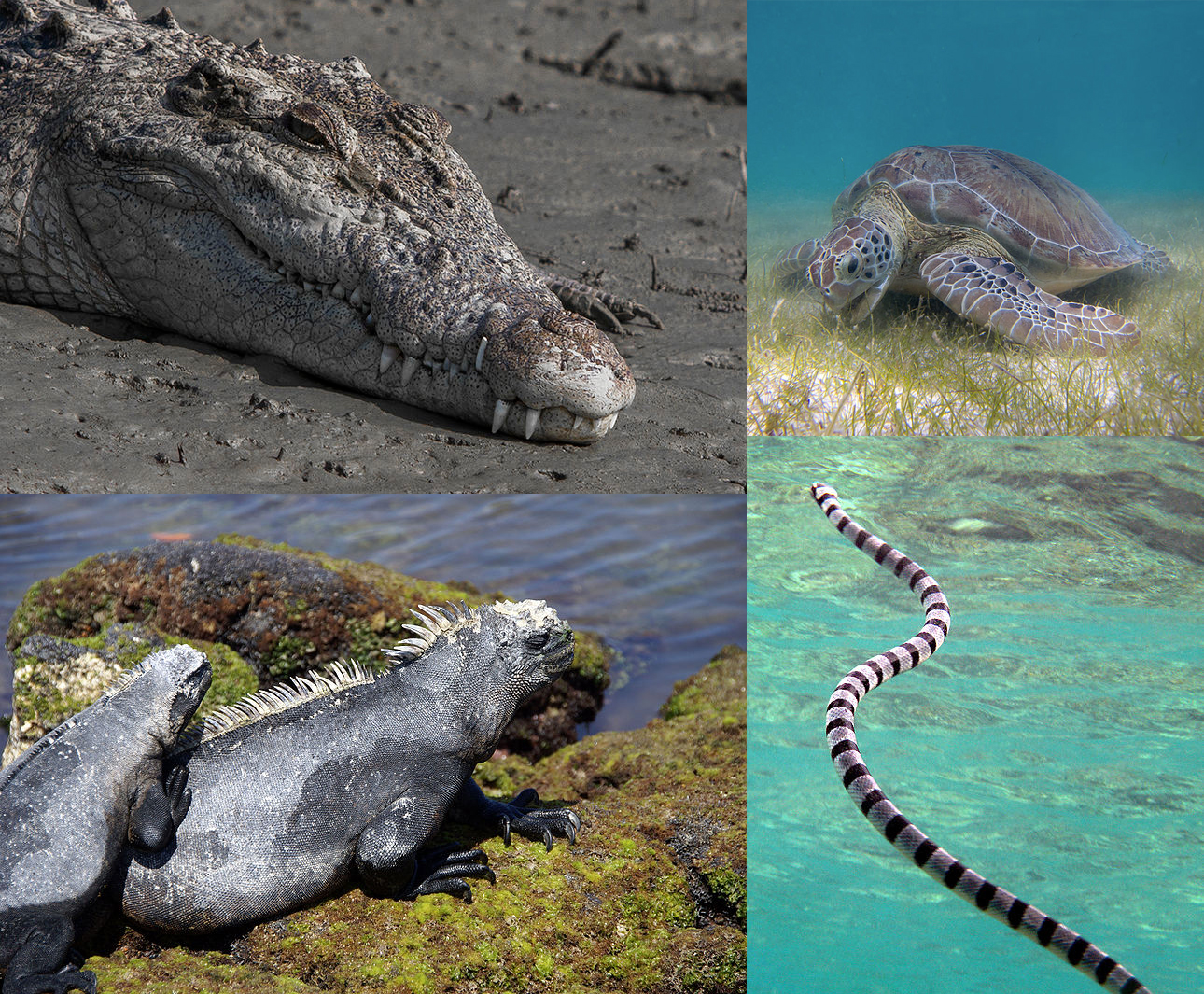
Extant Cenozoic marine reptiles: • Saltwater crocodile (top left) • Sea turtle (top right) • Marine iguana (bottom left) • Sea snake (bottom right)

Marine reptiles are reptiles which have become secondarily adapted for an aquatic or semiaquatic life in a marine environment. Only about 100 of the 12,000 extant reptile species and subspecies are classed as marine reptiles, including marine iguanas, sea snakes, sea turtles and saltwater crocodiles.

The earliest marine reptile was Mesosaurus (not to be confused with Mosasaurus), which arose in the Permian period of the Paleozoic era. During the Mesozoic era, many groups of reptiles became adapted to life in the seas, including such familiar clades as the ichthyosaurs, plesiosaurs (these two orders were once thought united in the group "Enaliosauria", a classification now cladistically obsolete), mosasaurs, nothosaurs, placodonts, sea turtles, thalattosaurs and thalattosuchians. Most marine reptile groups became extinct at the end of the Cretaceous period, but some still existed during the Cenozoic, most importantly the sea turtles. Other Cenozoic marine reptiles included the bothremydids, palaeophiid snakes, a few choristoderes such as Simoedosaurus and dyrosaurid crocodylomorphs. Various types of marine gavialid crocodilians remained widespread as recently as the Late Miocene.

Some marine reptiles, such as ichthyosaurs, plesiosaurs, metriorhynchid thalattosuchians, and mosasaurs became so well adapted to a marine lifestyle that they were incapable of venturing onto land and gave birth in the water. Others, such as sea turtles and saltwater crocodiles, return to shore to lay their eggs. Some marine reptiles also occasionally rest and bask on land.

== Extant groups ==
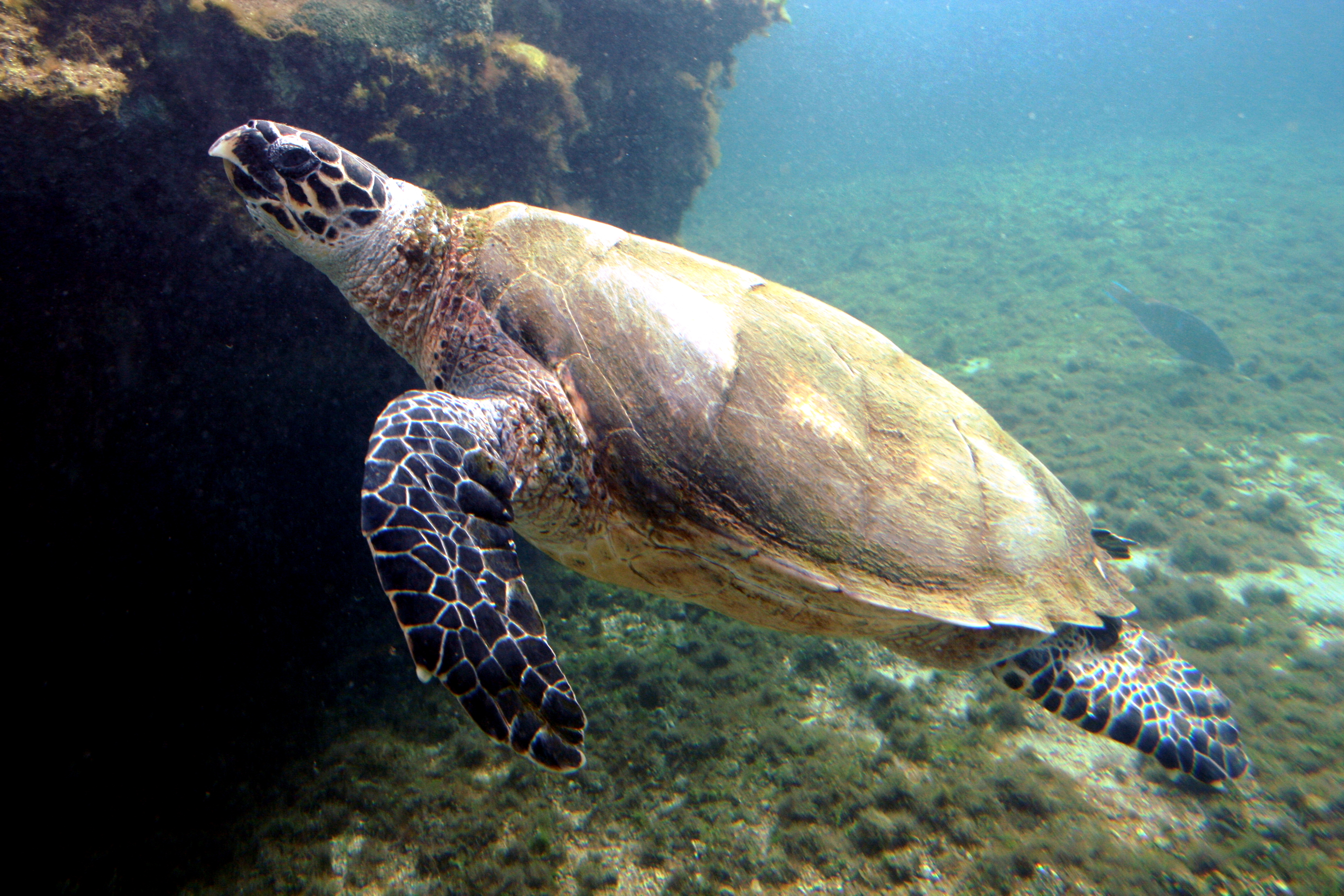
Hawksbill sea turtle (Eretmochelys imbricata)

- Sea turtles: there are seven extant species of sea turtles, which live mostly along the tropical and subtropical coastlines, though some do migrate long distances and have been known to travel as far north as Scandinavia. Sea turtles are largely solitary animals, though some do form large, though often loosely connected groups during nesting season. Although only seven turtle species are truly marine, many more dwell in brackish waters.
- Sea snakes: the most abundant of the marine reptiles, there are over 60 different species of sea snakes. They inhabit the tropical and subtropical waters of the Indian and Pacific oceans, though very limited reports of sightings suggest they may be extending into the Atlantic Ocean. Sea snakes are venomous and their bites have been known to be fatal, though generally they only bite when provoked and often inject only a very small, non-fatal quantity of venom. Sea snakes are distinguished from terrestrial snakes by a vertically flattened tail.
- Marine iguana: marine iguanas live only on the Galápagos Islands and are not fully adapted to marine life. Although they feed exclusively on marine plants and spend a good deal of their time in the water, they do nest on land and need to bask in the sun to reach their ideal body temperature; they are thus also subject to terrestrial predators.
- Saltwater and American crocodiles: none of the extant species of crocodiles are truly marine; however, the saltwater crocodile (Crocodylus porosus) does display adaptations to saltwater inhabitation and dwells in the brackish waters of Southeast Asia and Australia. Saltwater crocodiles dispose of excess salt in their bodies through specialized salt glands. These are the largest species of crocodile, also making them the largest reptiles. They can grow up to six meters in length. American crocodiles (Crocodylus acutus) similarly prefer brackish over freshwater habitats.

== Extinct groups ==
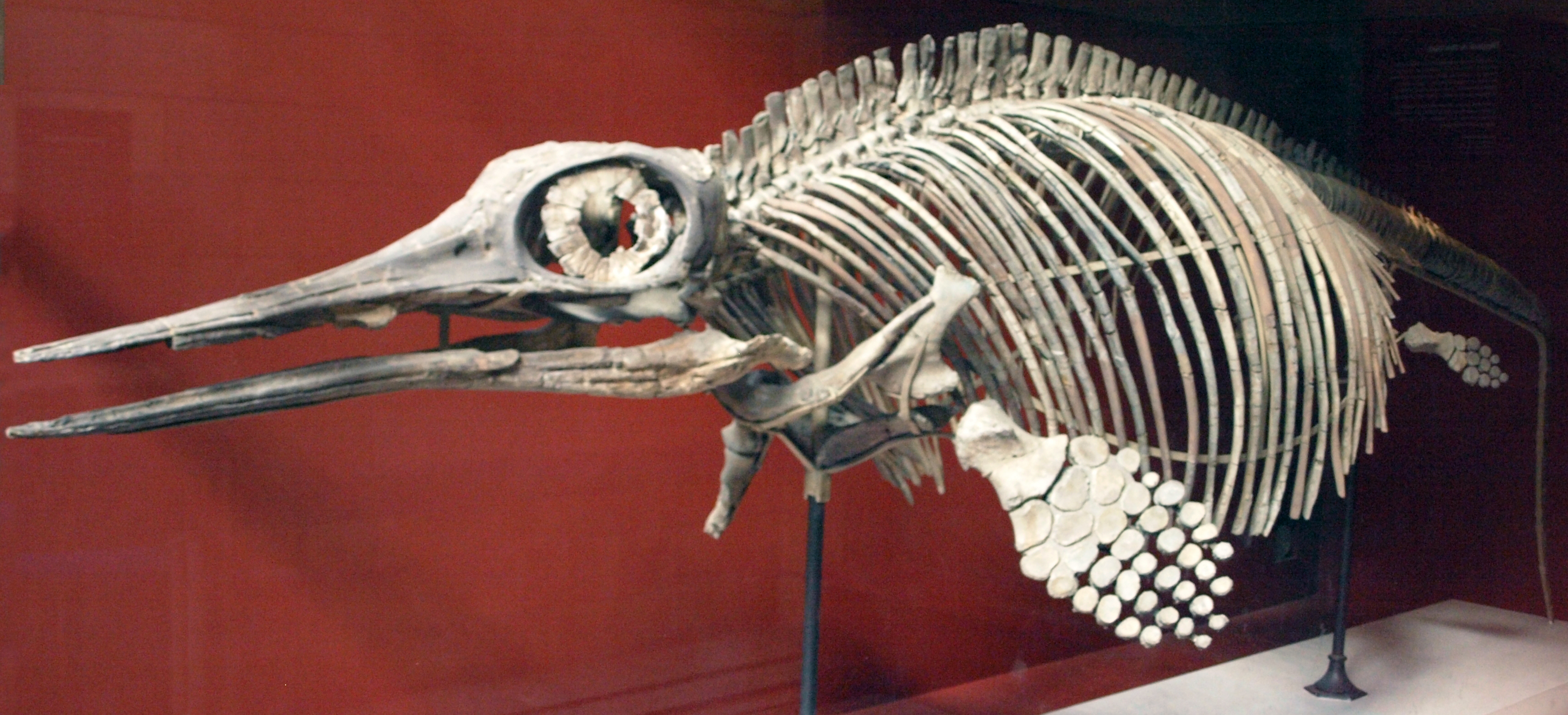
Fossil of Ophthalmosaurus icenius, a species of ichthyosaur

Marine reptiles had a significant evolutionary radiation during the Mesozoic period, contributing partly to what is known as the Mesozoic marine revolution. Most of these Mesozoic marine reptiles went extinct after the Cretaceous–Paleogene extinction event, with the sea turtles being the only surviving clade.

Known groups of Mesozoic marine reptiles include:

- Ichthyosaurs are marine reptiles with a dolphin-like body shape that flourished during the Mesozoic era.
- Sauropterygians are a diverse group of aquatic reptiles adapted for flipper-based aquatic locomotion. This group included the plesiosaurs, nothosaurs, and placodonts.
- Mosasaurs are a group of large, aquatic squamates (relatives of modern-day lizards and snakes) which became the dominant marine predators towards the end of the Cretaceous period.
- Thalattosaurs are a group of aquatic or semiaquatic marine reptiles of uncertain placement within the diapsid clade. One subgroup, the thalattosauroids, are known for their unusual downturned snouts and crushing dentition.
- Mesosaurs may be the first fully aquatic members of the reptile total group, and the only group known from the Paleozoic.
- Thalattosuchians are marine crocodylomorphs that flourished during the Jurassic period.
- Tanysaurs are archosauromorphs lived during the Triassic period, some of which (including Tanystropheus, Dinocephalosaurus, and Austronaga) evolved aquatic adaptations.
- Protostegids are large marine turtles lived during the Cretaceous period, which included the largest testudines ever recorded, Archelon.

== Conservation ==
Most species of marine reptiles are considered endangered to some degree. All but one species of sea turtles are endangered due to destruction of nesting habitats on coastal lands, exploitation, and marine fishing; many species of sea snakes are threatened or endangered due to commercial exploitation (sale of skins) and pollution especially in Asia; marine iguanas are threatened due to their very limited habitation range. Saltwater crocodiles are at low risk for extinction.

== See also ==
- List of marine reptiles
