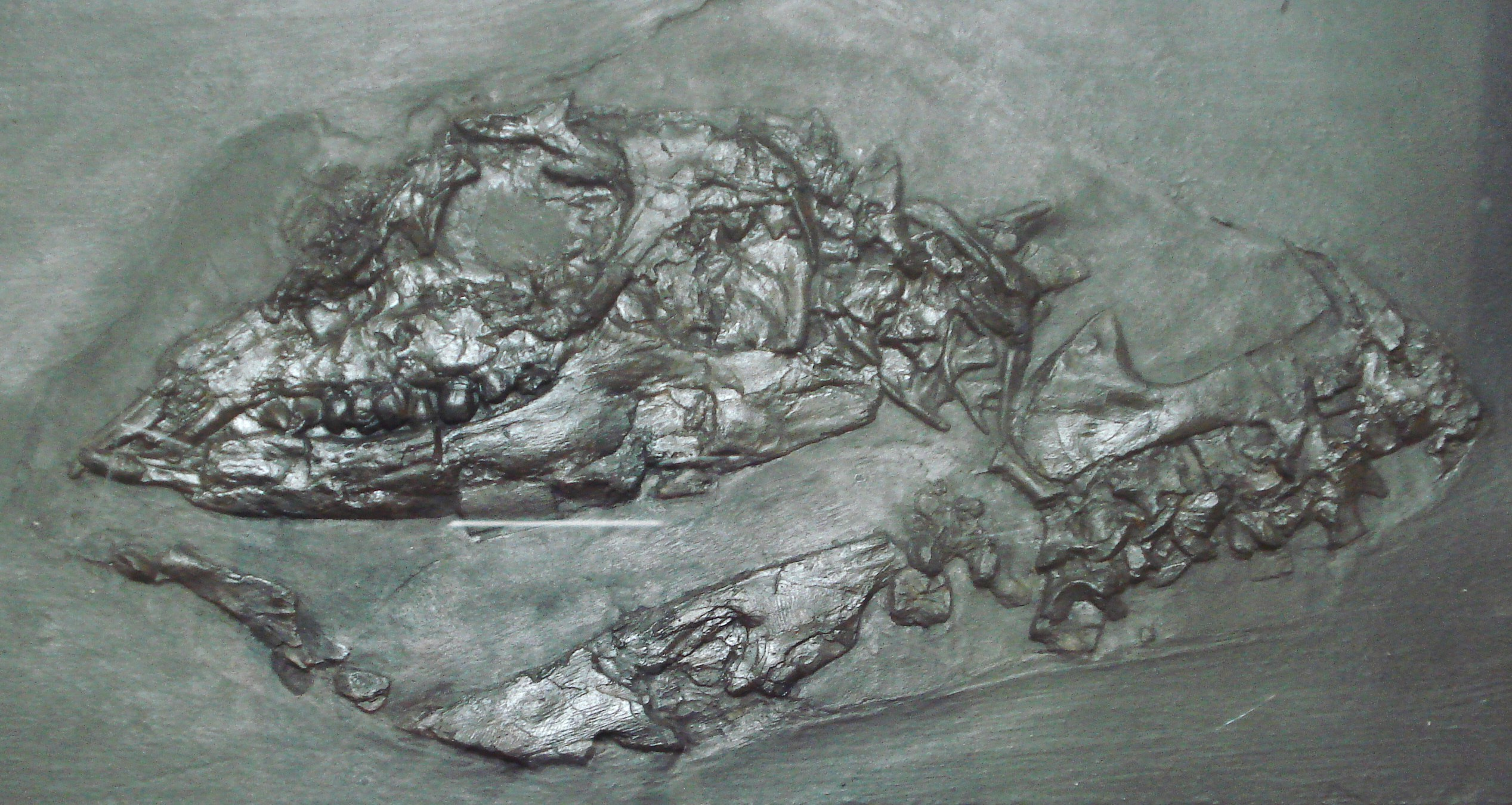
- Fossil skull

Scientific classification
- Kingdom: Animalia
- Phylum: Chordata
- Class: Reptilia
- Superorder: †Sauropterygia
- Order: †Placodontia
- Genus: †Paraplacodus; Peyer, 1931

Species
- †P. broilii Peyer, 1931 (type)

= Paraplacodus =

Paraplacodus Temporal range: Middle Triassic

Extinct genus of reptiles

Paraplacodus broilii is an extinct placodont sauropterygian from the Middle Triassic epoch, from the Anisian until Ladinian stages. The fossils were uncovered in Northern Italy and the species was named in 1931 by Bernhard Peyer. Paraplacodus means "Almost Placodus", in reference to its similarity to Placodus.

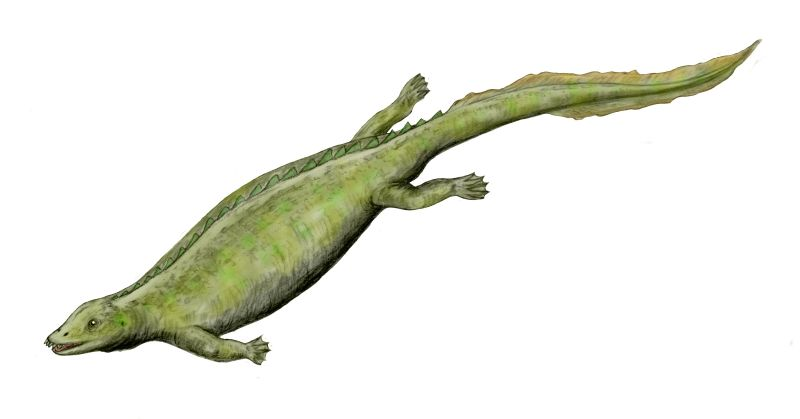
Restoration

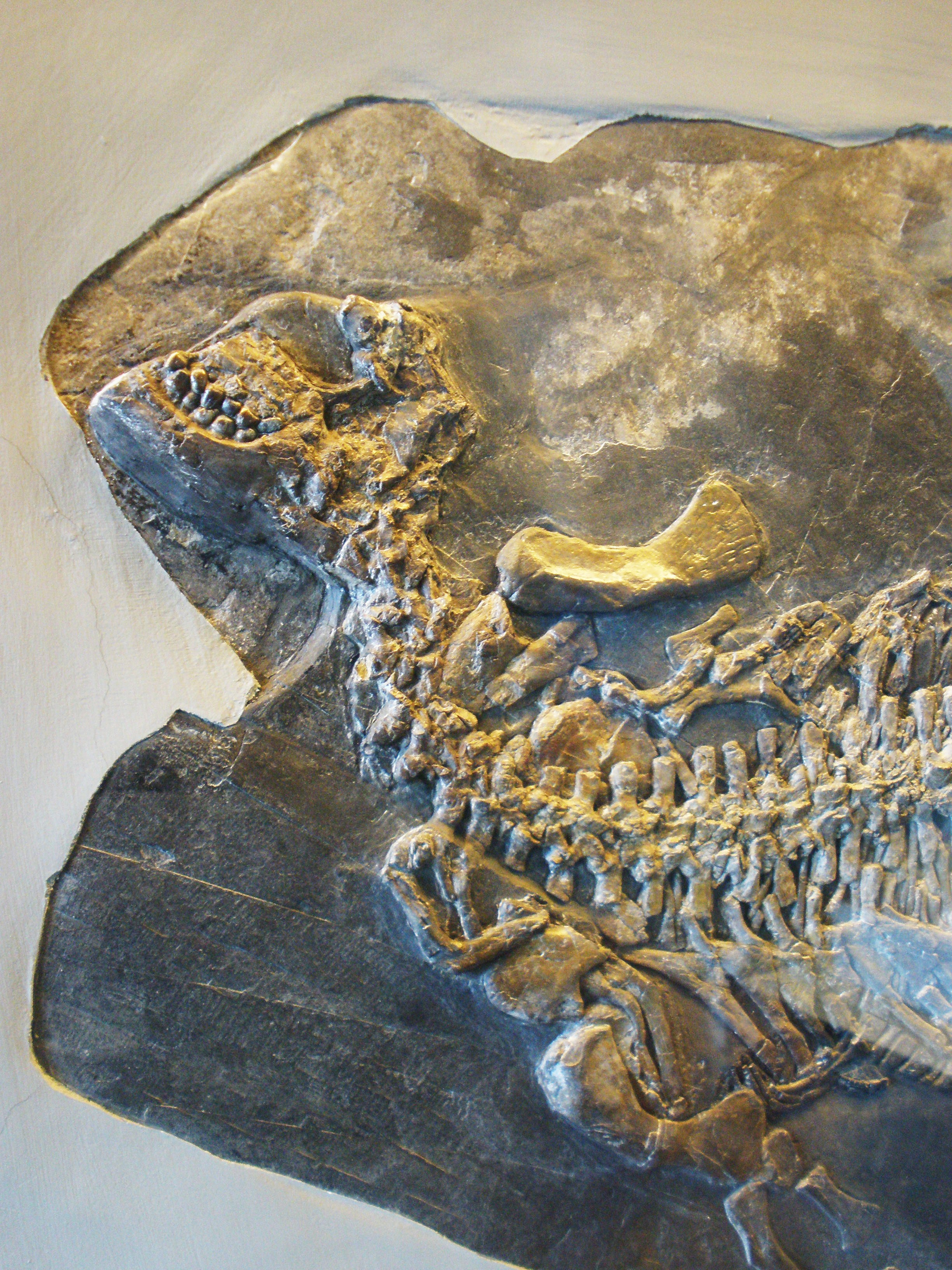
Paraplacodus broilii fossil

Most known placodont species can be divided into two groups - the unarmored placodontoids, which would resemble a large, scaly, tooth-filled newt, or the armored cyamodontids, which would resemble a heavily armored turtle; Paraplacodus belonged to the former family. It was a small reptile, measuring about 1.5 metres (4.9 ft) in total body length.

The jaws of Paraplacodus were adapted to eat shellfish, with three pairs of protruding teeth in the top row and two rows of protruding teeth in the front of the jaw, with rounded crushing teeth in the upper and lower jaws. Thick ribs formed a box-like ribcage with an almost-square cross-section, which enabled Paraplacodus to remain close to the seabed while hunting for food.

== Palaeoecology ==
Like the majority of described placodonts, Paraplacodus was an aquatic reptile that fed on shellfish, though recent research suggests its diet was broader and not solely composed of hard-shelled organisms. Its specialised anterior teeth suggest that it would have fed on small, raspberry-shaped macroalgae.
