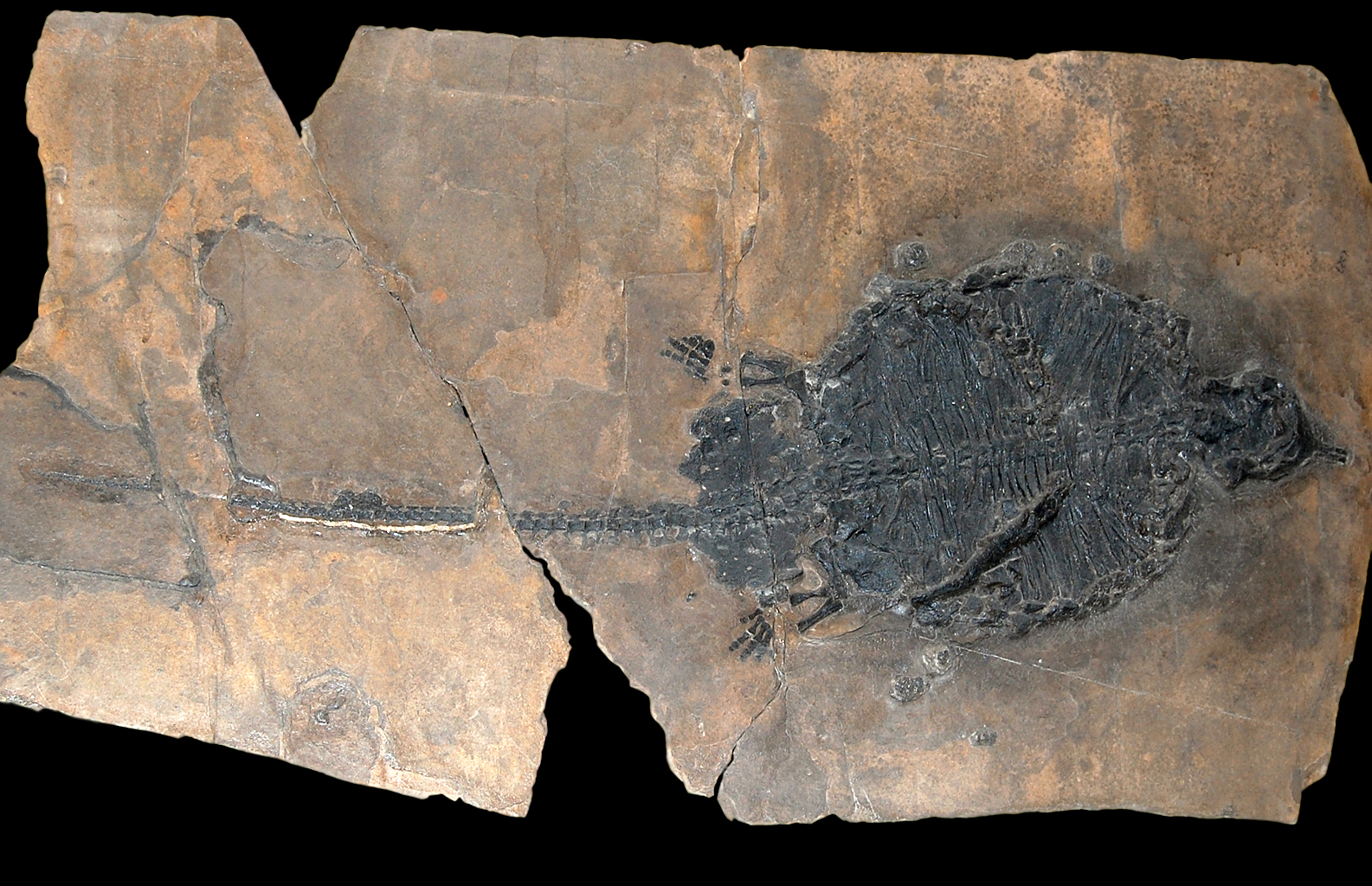
- P. alpinum fossil

Scientific classification
- Domain: Eukaryota
- Kingdom: Animalia
- Phylum: Chordata
- Class: Reptilia
- Superorder: †Sauropterygia
- Order: †Placodontia
- Family: †Placochelyidae
- Genus: †Psephoderma; Meyer, 1858

Species
- †P. alpinum Meyer, 1858 (type); †P. anglicum Meyer, 1867

= Psephoderma =

Psephoderma Temporal range: Late Triassic

Extinct genus of reptiles

Psephoderma (meaning "pebbly skin", from the Ancient Greek psepho (ψῆφος), "pebbly", and derma (δέρμα), "skin") is a genus of placodonts very similar to the related genera Placochelys and Cyamodus. Psephoderma had a flattened skull and a narrow, straight rostrum, much narrower than that of its relatives. Inside this skull, embedded in the jaws, were rounded teeth specialized for crushing the shellfish it ate. Unlike henodontid placodonts, Psephoderma's carapace was divided into two pieces, one on the shoulders and back, and another on the ventral end. Psephoderma grew to 180 centimetres (5.9 ft) long, larger than many of its relatives, and lived in the Late Triassic (Norian - Rhaetian), about 210 million years ago. It was one of the last placodonts to live. Fossils of Psephoderma have been found in the Rhaetian deposits in the Alps and in England, hence the specific names.

== Description ==
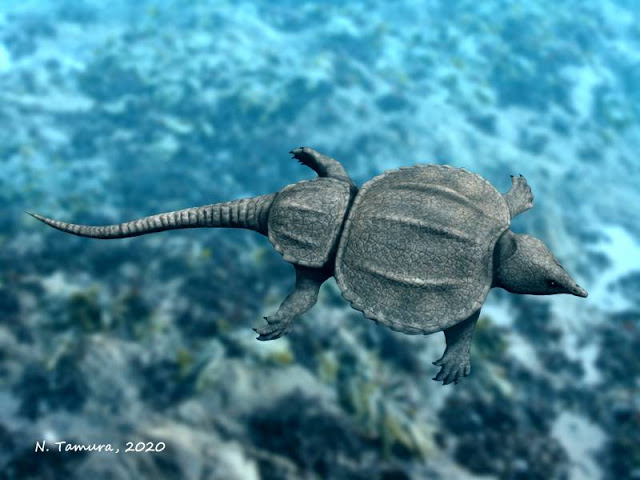
Life restoration of Psephoderma alpinum

Psephoderma had a long, narrow rostrum, which was the main difference between its skull and those of its relatives. This rostrum bore paired grooves on the inside of the mouth, which led to the internal nares and are a diagnostic feature for the genus. The anterior processes of the maxillae stretched forwards a long way along the rostrum, while the posterior processes of the premaxillae stretched a long way back up the rostrum and came between the external nares and between the nasal bones. The nasal bones were very small, mere splinters of bone. The orbits were large and somewhat irregularly shaped, and indicate that the eyes were on top of the head looking upwards. Its pineal foramen was large, and anteriorly placed, with its anterior edge bordered by the frontal bones. Unlike most of its relatives, its ectopterygoid is not known and may not be present, as in Protenodontosaurus. The P. alpinum species had decidedly elongated, posterior, tooth-bearing plates for crushing the shellfish that formed its diet. No teeth were present along the premaxillae or the rostral area of the maxillae, but four crushing teeth were in each side of the palate, the first three in a triangle of small, rounded teeth and the fourth a short distance behind them. The fourth tooth was huge, far larger than the first three. The lack of teeth near the front of the mouth and rostrum indicate that the elongated rostrum was mainly used for rooting out or digging up shellfish, which would then be taken into the back of the mouth and crushed by the large teeth. Psephoderma's temporal fossae were narrow, but highly elongated. The posterior process of the postorbital bones reached far back into the temporal arches, underneath the temporal fossae. The whole skull was highly ventrodorsally compressed. It had temporal tubercles, but they were small, and restricted solely to the posterior ends of the squamosal bones. Its occiput was deeply excavated and its entire braincase very small. However, the braincase walls were quite thick and well armoured.

The carapace of Psephoderma was made up of two parts, one of which covered the rib cage and thorax and the other of which covered the pelvis. Both parts of the carapace were made of partially fused scutes, roughly hexagonal or circular in shape. Its tail was quite long, up to about 80 cm, and had scutes all the way down it. The limbs were relatively small and would have been used as paddles, but had individual toes rather than a flipper.

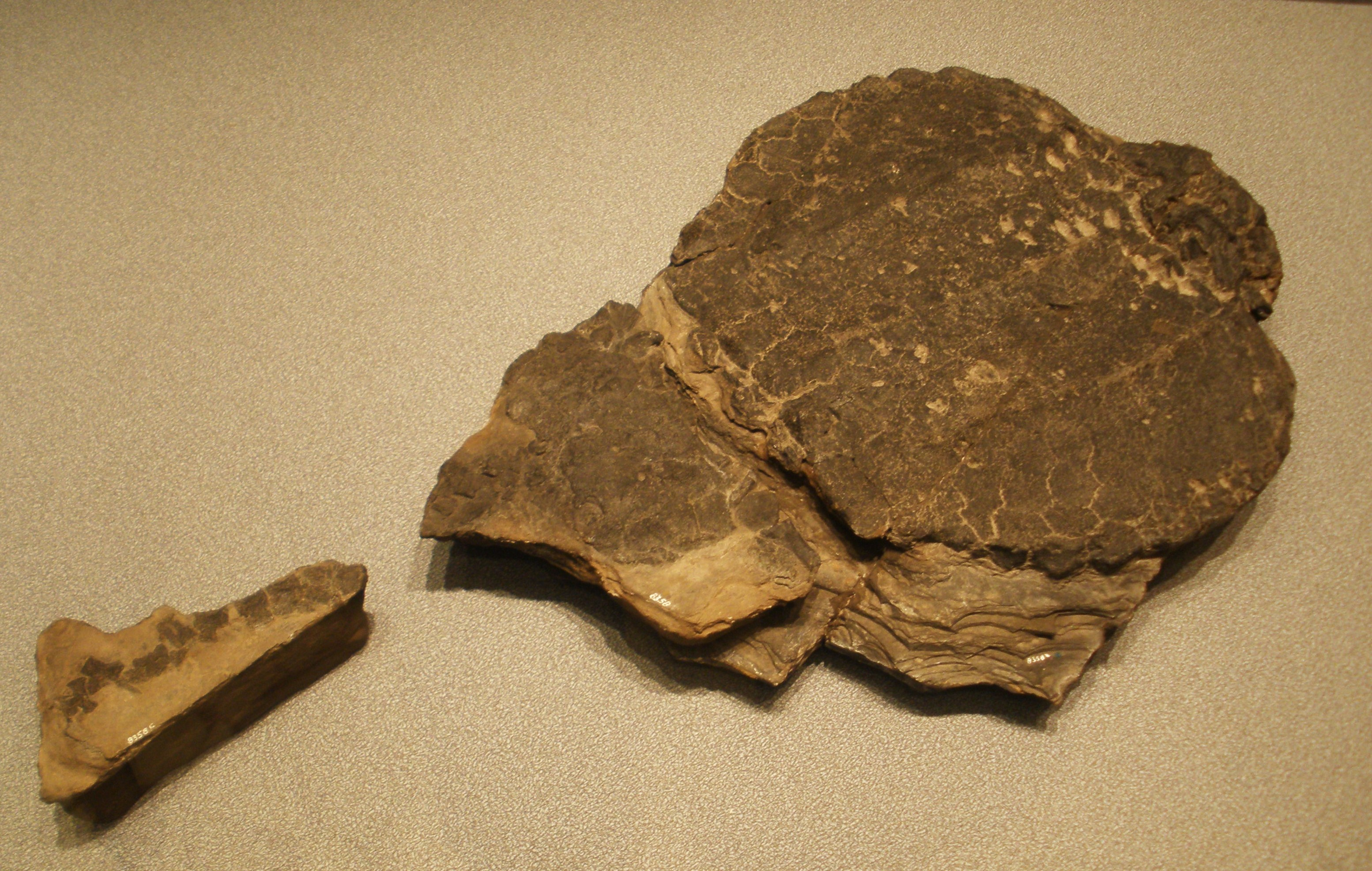
P. alpinum shell
