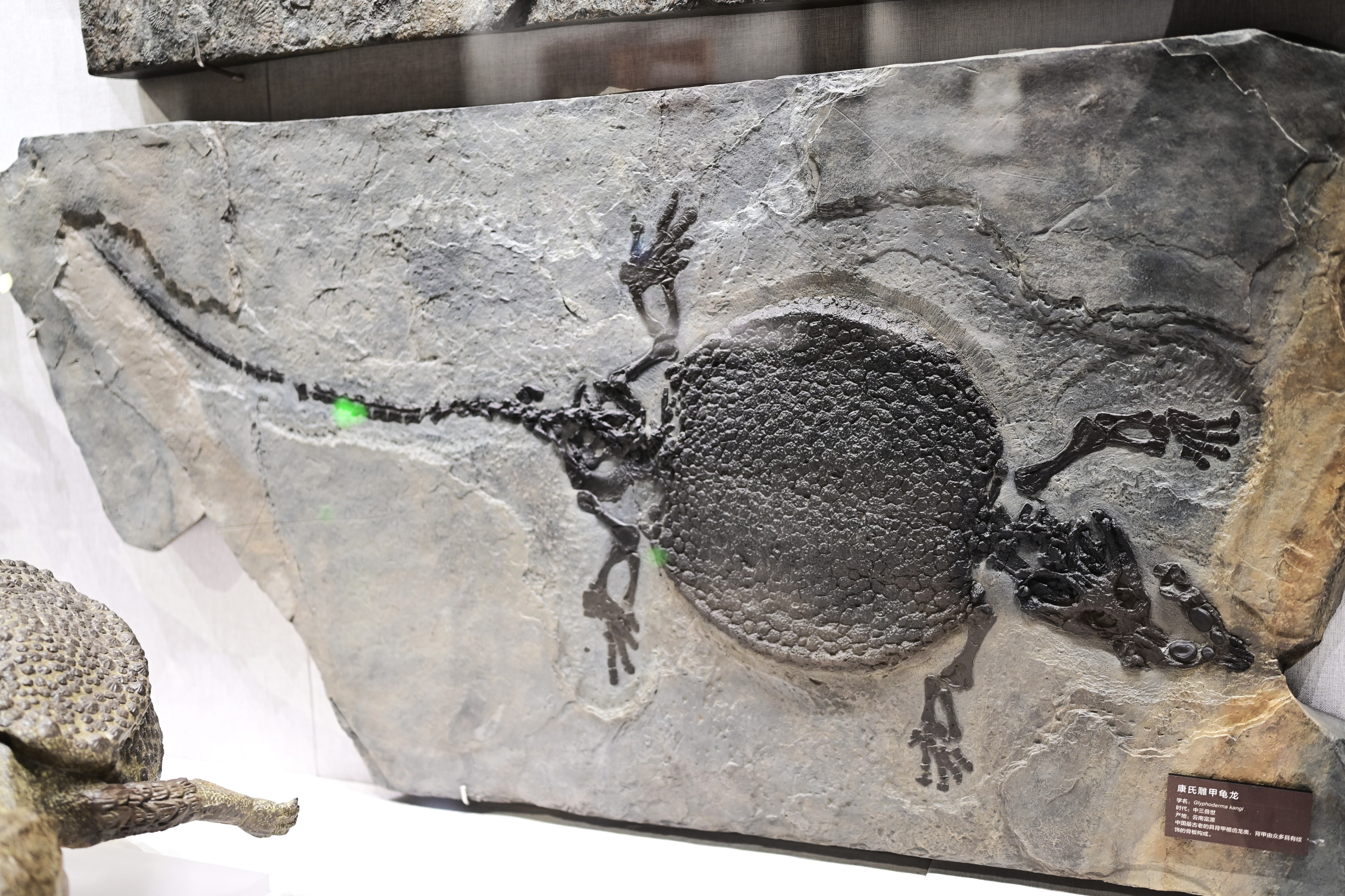
- Fossil specimen at the Baoding Natural History Museum

Scientific classification
- Kingdom: Animalia
- Phylum: Chordata
- Class: Reptilia
- Superorder: †Sauropterygia
- Order: †Placodontia
- Family: †Placochelyidae
- Genus: †Glyphoderma; Zhao et al., 2008

Type species
- †Glyphoderma kangi Zhao et al., 2008

Other species
- †G. robusta Hu, Jiang & Li, 2019

= Glyphoderma =

Glyphoderma Temporal range: Middle Triassic

Extinct genus of reptiles

Glyphoderma is an extinct genus of placodont reptile from the Middle Triassic of China with two known species, G. kangi and G. robusta. It differs from its relative Psephochelys in having three, rather than one, fused osteoderms on the posterior skull surface, and has an earlier temporal range, from the Ladinian epoch rather than the Late Triassic. Otherwise, it is similar in most respects to the other plachochelyids found in China. The name comes from the Greek 'γλυφος', 'sculpture' and 'δερμα', 'skin' referring to its unique carapace structure. The specific name honours a Mr. Kang Ximin.

== Discovery and naming ==
The holotype of G. kangi, an almost complete skeleton, was found in 2008 in Fuyuan, Yunnan Province of central China in the Zhuganpo Formation. It is preserved in a thick block of limestone, and so the ventral side is not well known. The total length is 873 mm.

Su et al. (2025) described two new specimens of Glyphoderma kangi, providing new information on the anatomy of the studied placodont.

== Features ==
=== Skull ===
Glyphoderma's skull is the shape of an isosceles triangle, with a long narrow rostrum. The skull is 110.6 mm long and 83.7 mm wide. There are three large osteoderms fused to the temporal arch on each side of the skull, which protrude backwards. The suture between the maxilla and the jugal is underneath the posterior part of the orbit. The premaxilla has a smaller posterior process than in Placochelys, only reaching the naris while that of Placochelys reaches the orbit. Most of the other cranial bones are entirely fused, giving Glyphoderma a very strong skull. The temporal fenestrae are about twice as large as the orbits, at 37.3 mm long rather than 25.9 mm. There are two blunt teeth in the posterior part of the lower jaw, but most of the dentary lacks teeth entirely as in the other placochelyids.

=== Carapace ===
The carapace, made up of more than 400 osteoderms, is roughly circular but with small excavations at front and back to allow the neck and tail to move around a little more. Its dorsal surface is slightly convex and has a shallow longitudinal groove along the midline. The excavation at the back is biconcave rather than simply concave, and just exposes the pelvis. The anterior excavation is more open than that of Psephochelys. The osteoderms that make up the carapace are pentagonal or hexagonal, and are tightly sutured but not fused as they are in Psephochelys. Around the edge of the carapace, they are more isolated and have drifted away from their original positions. The carapace is very slightly wider, at 262 mm, than it is long (242.8 mm). There are two slightly enlarged osteoderms, one on either side of the anterior excavation, but these are not tuberculiform and are much smaller than those in Psephochelys. All the osteoderms are highly convex and have radial grooves and ridges which are very deep or very high, hence the genus name. They also have many tiny pits.

=== Vertebrae and tail ===
Glyphoderma has five or six cervical vertebrae, all of which are very flattened and wide, with low neural spines. Only one dorsal vertebra can be seen beneath the carapace. There are four sacral vertebrae, with distally expanded pleurapophyses enclosing a foramen between each pair. 34 caudal vertebrae are preserved, although some may be missing, and the first three of them have transverse processes.

=== Front legs ===
Only the distal end of each scapula is exposed by the carapace, but the humeri are well preserved and exposed, at 65.7 mm long. The distal end of each humerus is expanded, with a flat triangular depression on the dorsal side, and an open ectepicondylar groove along the anterior margin. The ulna and radius are of very similar lengths (39.5 and 40.8 mm respectively) but the radius is much thicker. Both ends of the radius have a depression on the dorsal surface. There are five ossifications in the carpus, but the manus is very poorly preserved and we know almost nothing about it.

=== Hind legs ===
The femur is expanded at both ends, but has a short shaft (only 59 mm). The space between the tibia and fibula is very large as the tibia has a straight medial edge and a concave lateral one. They are roughly the same length (47.5 mm fibula, 49.4 mm tibia). The calcaneum and astragalus form a depression for the distal end of the tibia to fit into. There are four other tarsals and four metatarsals, but it is very difficult to determine the phalangeal formula due to the poor preservation of the foot.
