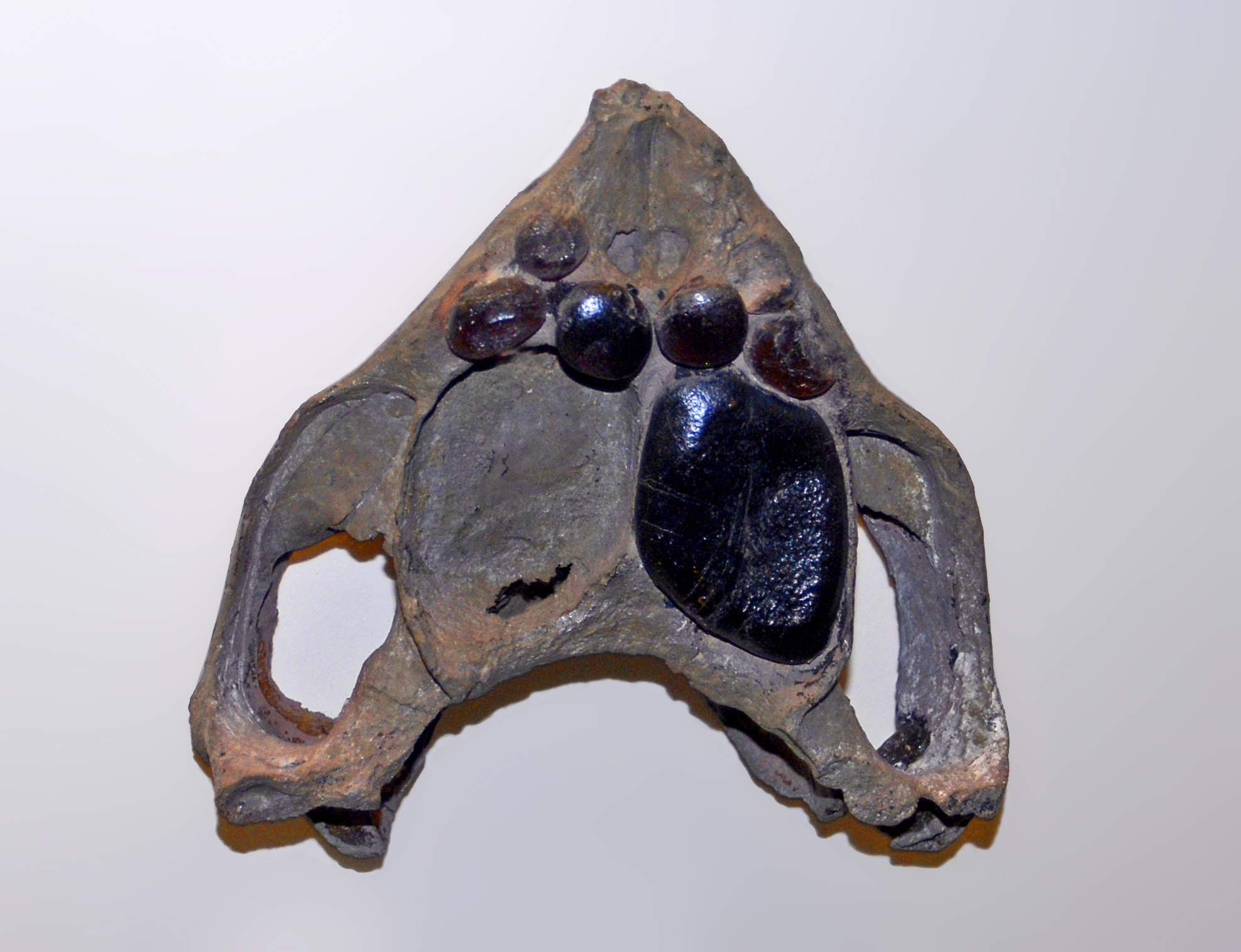
- Fossil with teeth of Macroplacus raeticus from Triassic of Germany

Scientific classification
- Kingdom: Animalia
- Phylum: Chordata
- Class: Reptilia
- Superorder: †Sauropterygia
- Order: †Placodontia
- Superfamily: †Cyamodontoidea
- Family: †Cyamodontidae
- Genus: †Macroplacus; Schubert-Klempnauer, 1975
- Species: †M. raeticus

Binomial name
- †Macroplacus raeticus Schubert and Klempnauer, 1975

= Macroplacus =

Macroplacus Temporal range: Late Triassic, 205.6–201.6 Ma

Extinct genus of reptiles

Macroplacus is an extinct genus of placodont reptiles. The type species is Macroplacus raeticus and the fossil record of this species dates back to the upper Triassic, Rhaetian age (age range: 205.6 to 201.6 million years ago). These fossils have been found in Germany, at Hinterstein near Hindelang im Allgäu.

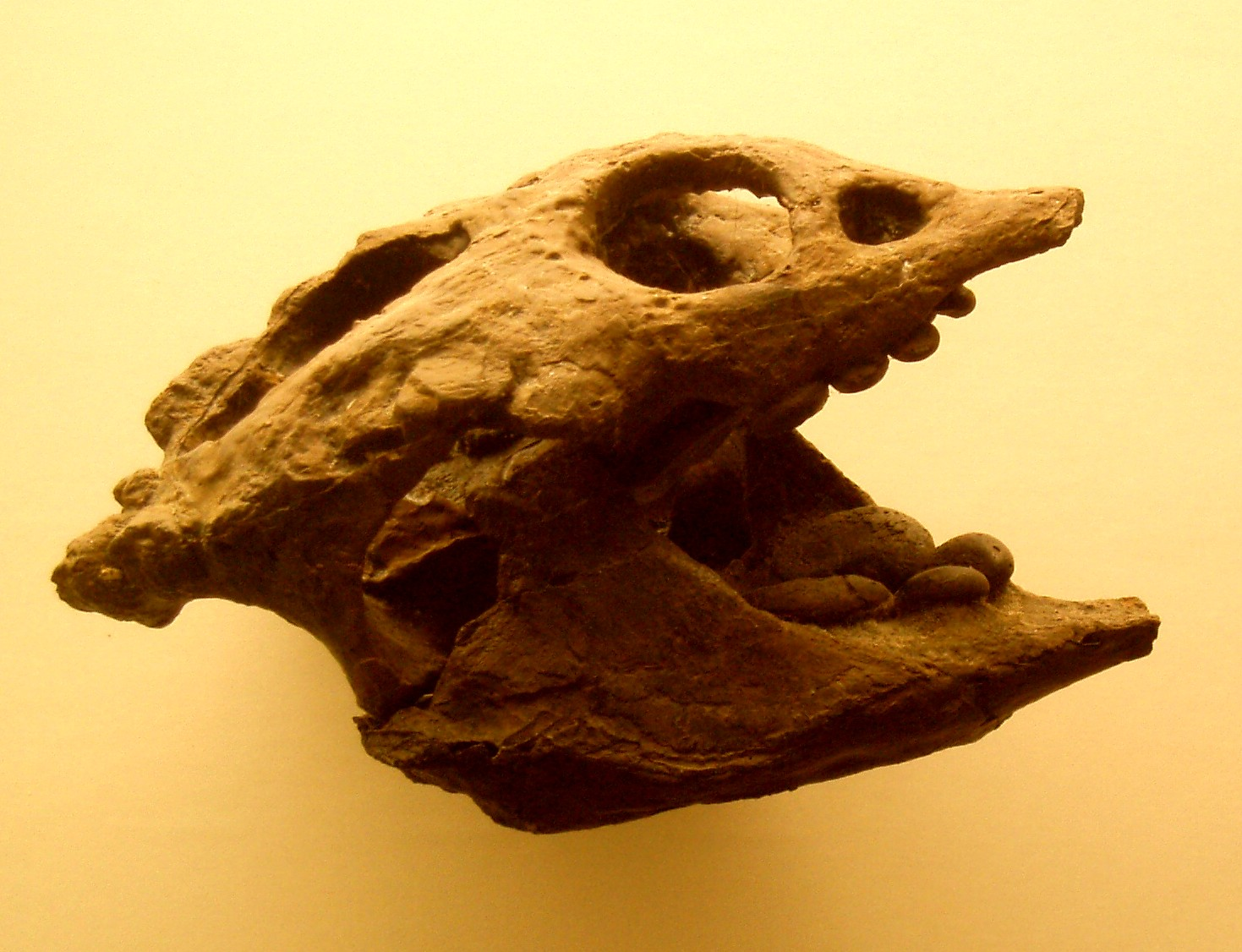
Fossil skull of Macroplacus raeticus

== Taxonomy ==
The classification of Macroplacus is controversial but it is usually placed in the Cyamodontidae or in the Placochelyidae. These reptiles are placodonts, a group of animal probably related to diapsids, but that look similar to the turtles. Macroplacus, in particular, was a representative of cyamodontoidea, characterized by heavy armor and narrow snouts.

== Description ==
Macroplacus raeticus, the only known species, possessed a relatively flat body, quite armored and similar to that of a turtle. The skull was very robust, broad posteriorly, with a snout narrower in the foremost part. The jaws were exceptionally strong and probably had a powerful musculature. The teeth were present on the palate and jaw, and were round shaped, with huge molars. The whole animal was about 1 metre (3.3 ft) long.

== Biology ==
It was an animal with an amphibious way of life, but it was little adapted to marine life. Like all placodonts, Macroplacus had to swim slowly in shallow water and coastal areas, in search of shellfish that made up most of its diet. The large palatal hemispheric teeth could break the shells of mollusks.
