= Bernhard Peyer =

Swiss paleontologist and anatomist

- Born: 25 July 1885; Schaffhausen
- Died: 23 February 1963 (aged 77); Zürich
- Occupation: Palaeontologist

Bernhard Peyer (25 July 1885 – 23 February 1963) was a Swiss paleontologist and anatomist who served as a professor at the University of Zurich. A major contribution was on the evolution of vertebrate teeth.

Peyer was born in Schaffhausen, Switzerland, the son of a textile-factory owning namesake father and Sophie Frey. While at secondary school in Schaffhausen he met Ferdinand Schalch in the field who influenced him into paleontology although there had been scientists in the family in the past, including the anatomist Johann Conrad Peyer (1653–1712). In 1905 he went to study at the University of Tübingen and then at Munich where he listed to lectures by Richard von Hertwig, Ferdinand Broili and Ernst Stromer von Reichenbach. In 1907 he graduated from the University of Zurich with a dissertation on Die Entwicklung des Schädelskeletes von Vipera aspis under Arnold Lang. He received a doctorate in 1911. In 1912 he went on an expedition to Rovigno, Italy and then to South America (1912–13). In 1918 he became a Privatdozent at the University of Zurich and began to teach paleontology. One of his areas of interest was in the evolution of mammals and examined the changes in dentition. He became a full professor in 1943 and retired in 1955. His work on the evolution of teeth was translated into English as Comparative Odontology and published in 1968.

Peyer married Hildegard Amsler (widow of a cousin, mother of the paleontologist Hans Conrad Peyer) in 1926 and they had five children. He named a placodont Cyamodus hildegardis in her honour in 1931. A street in Meride village at the foot of Monte San Giorgio where he made many paleontological excavations was named in his honour. The species Omphalosaurus peyeri, Morganucodon peyeri and Ticinepomis peyeri are named after him.

== See also ==
- Natural History Museum of the University of Zurich
