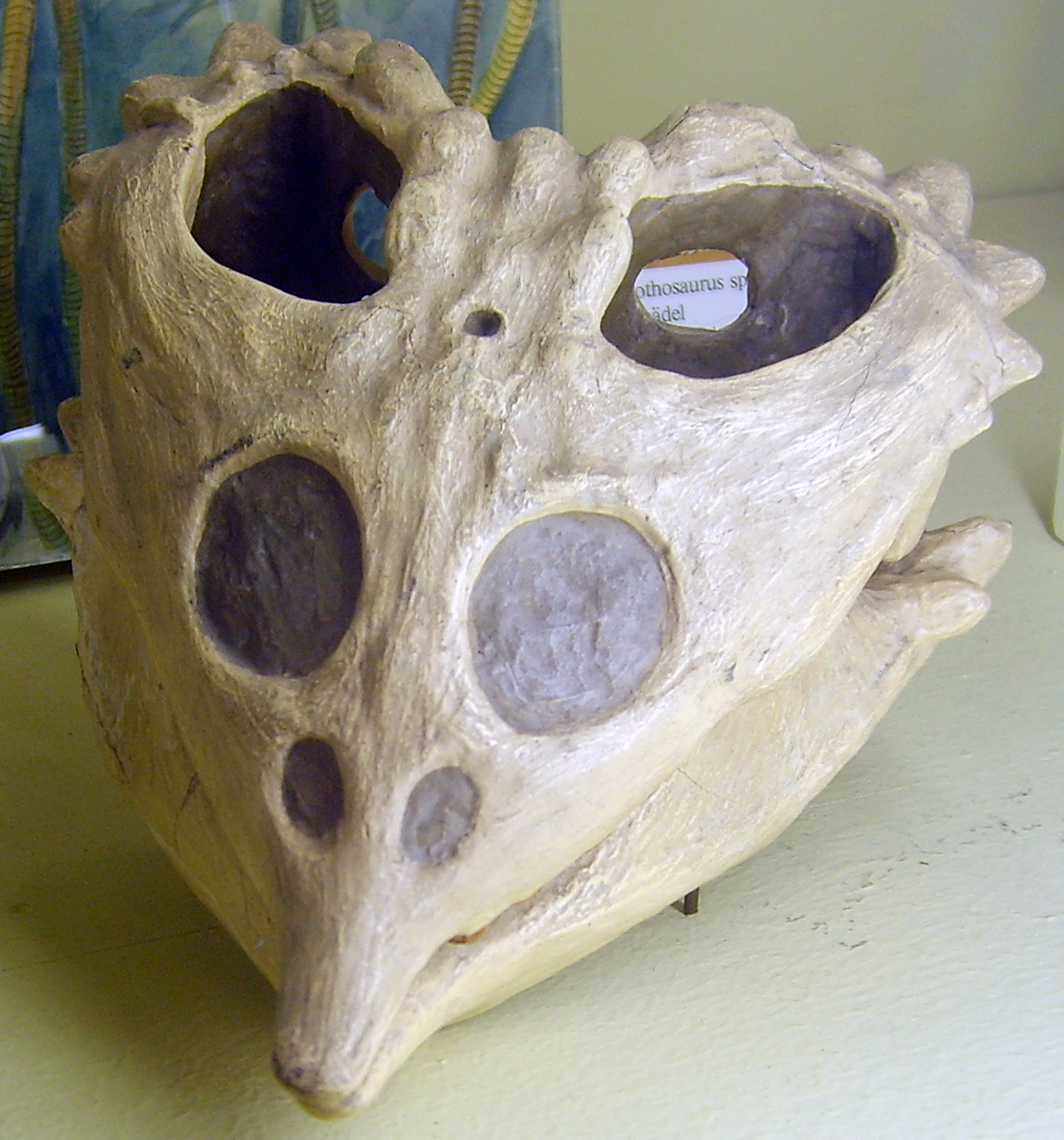
- Restored Placochelys placodonta skull at the Museum für Naturkunde, Berlin

Scientific classification
- Kingdom: Animalia
- Phylum: Chordata
- Class: Reptilia
- Superorder: †Sauropterygia
- Order: †Placodontia
- Superfamily: †Cyamodontoidea
- Family: †Placochelyidae; Jaekel, 1910

Genera
- †Glyphoderma; †Placochelys; †Psephochelys; †Psephoderma; †Psephosauriscus

= Placochelyidae =

Placochelyidae Temporal range: Mid to Late Triassic

Extinct family of reptiles

Placochelyidae is an extinct family of placodonts belonging to the superfamily Cyamodontoidea.

== Genera ==
- †Glyphoderma
- †Placochelys
- †Psephochelys
- †Psephoderma
- †Psephosauriscus
