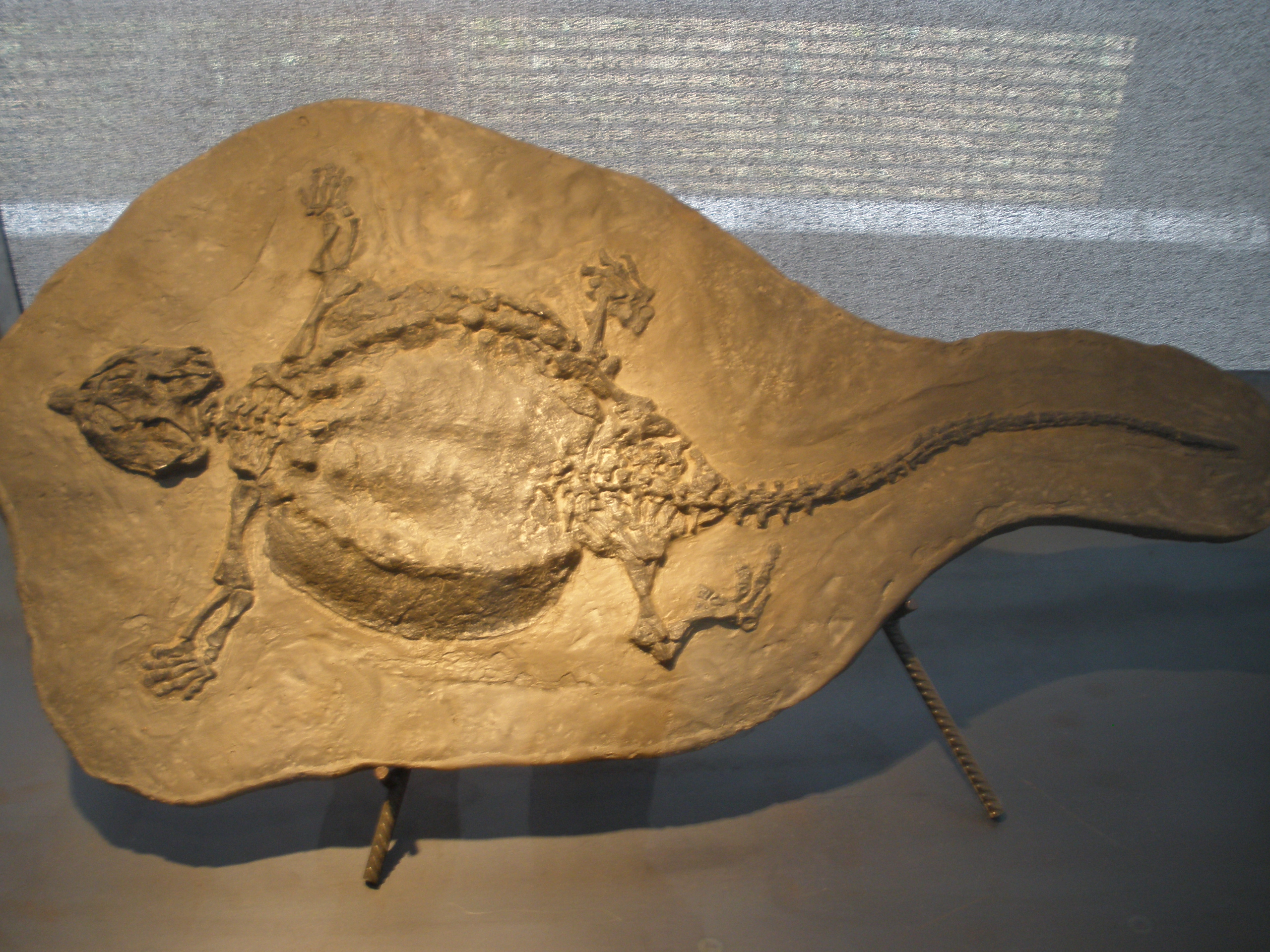
- Fossil skeleton

Scientific classification
- Kingdom: Animalia
- Phylum: Chordata
- Class: Reptilia
- Superorder: †Sauropterygia
- Order: †Placodontia
- Superfamily: †Cyamodontoidea
- Family: †Cyamodontidae
- Genus: †Cyamodus; Meyer, 1863

Species
- †C. rostratus (Münster, 1839) (type); †C. hildegardis Peyer, 1931a; †C. kuhnschneyderi Nosotti & Pinna 1993; †C. munsteri (Agassiz, 1833-45); †C. orientalis (Wang et al., 2019); †C. tarnowitzensis Gürich, 1884

Synonyms
- Placodus rostratus, Muenster (1839); Placodus muensteri, Aggassiz (1839); Placodus laticeps, Meyer (1863)

= Cyamodus =

Cyamodus Temporal range: Middle-Late Triassic, 245–235 Ma

Extinct genus of reptiles

Cyamodus (pron.: SIE-ah-MO-dus) is a genus of placodonts known from several species described from Middle-Late Triassic of Europe and China. The genus was described by Christian Erich Hermann von Meyer in 1863, based on specimens found in Germany. Like some other placodonts, Cyamodus has an armoured carapace composed of irregular hexagonal plates, with the mouth containing a small number of large, rounded teeth that were likely involved in crushing hard shelled organisms (durophagy).

== Discovery ==
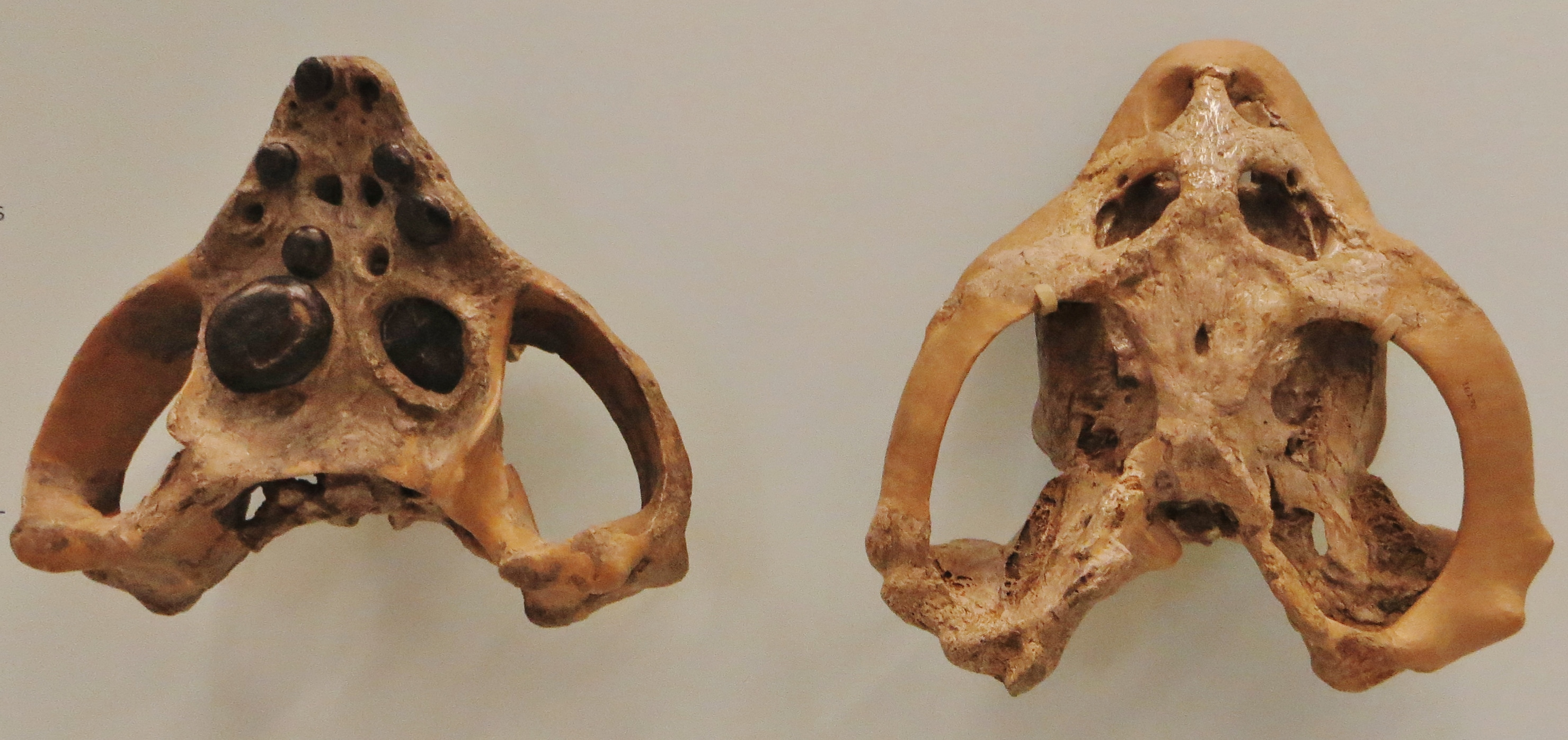
C. rostratus skull from below and above

Thus far, six species of Cyamodus have been identified - C. rostratus, C. munsteri, C. tarnowitzensis, C. hildegardis, C. kuhnschneyderi, and C. orientalis.

Initially considered to be an ancestral turtle due to its testudine-like head and large, bifurcated carapace. However further investigation resulted in its reclassification as a placodont, and it is closely related to other turtle-like reptiles of the Triassic period such as Henodus and Psephoderma. Similar to these other placodonts, Cyamodus lived hovering close to the sea floor, vacuuming up various shellfish, and crushing them between its blunt teeth.

Historically, the first Cyamodus remains were found in Upper Muschelkalk shallow marine limestones at near Bayreuth in Bavaria (Germany). They included the incomplete holotype skulls of Cyamodus muensteri and Cyamodus rostatus, which along with all other placodont remains recovered from the six quarries on the Lainecker Range in northern Bavaria were originally considered to have been derived from fish. The earliest Cyamodus skull was later restored by Muenster, with the addition of four teeth that had not been present in the original skull, and was named Placodus muensteri.

Further placodont remains were found by Muenster, who collected many placodont cranial remains in the Bindlach and Lainecker Range quarries. All placodont remains from those sites were then revised as being of reptilian origin by Owen (1858). A complete Cyamodus skeleton, including its skull, is known for C. hildegardis, which was found outside the Germanic Basin in the northern Tethys in Switzerland. Middle Triassic sauropterygian placodonts have become increasingly important for developing new ideas to the evolutionary history of their relatives, the turtles, whereas modern analyses place placodonts not as their ancestors using morphological cladistic analyses based on the bone osteology. The study of these placodonts contributes to our understanding of the Germanic Basin and the reptile distributions.

An intriguing placodont that appears to be intermediate between Cyamodus and the placochelyids, Protenodontosaurus italicus, was described by Giovanni Pinna in 1990.

== Description ==
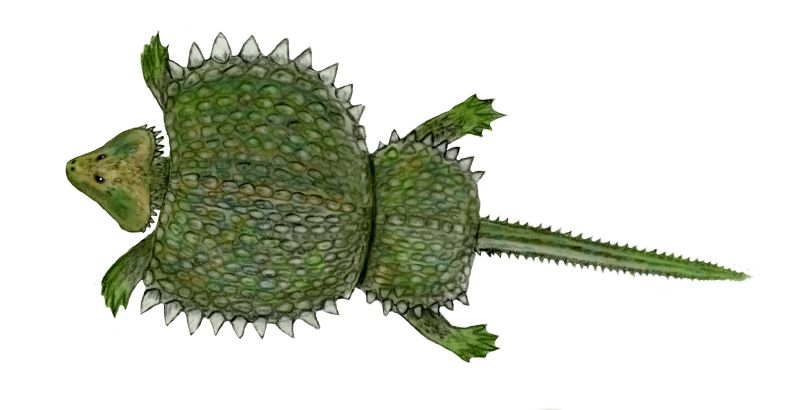
Restoration of C. rostratus

Cyamodus was a relatively small reptile, with most species measuring 1.3–1.5 m (4.3–4.9 ft) long and weighing 20–25 kg (44–55 lb); the smallest species, C. rostratus, was about 0.9 m (3.0 ft) long and weighed 5 kg (11 lb). It was a heavily armored swimmer that fed mainly on shellfish that it was specialized to uproot and crush with its powerful jaws. The body of Cyamodus, specifically the armor, has been described as possessing a turtle-like flatness. The shell was a two-part carapace on the upper surface of the body. The larger half covered Cyamodus from the neck to the hips and spread out flat, almost encompassing the limbs. The second, smaller plate covered the hips and the base of the tail. The shells themselves are covered in hexagonal or circular plates of armor. The skull is heart-shaped and broad.

Distinct from Paraplacodus, the skull of Cyamodus had a shorter rostrum, a smaller orbit and a larger upper temporal fenestra that was rimmed by ossifications. The teeth were flat discs, only one tooth appeared on each premaxilla and only two teeth appeared on each maxilla, with the largest teeth on the pterygoid. The quadratojugal joined the squamosal and sealed up the lateral temporal fenestra from the ancestral species (Paraplacodus).

The carapace of C. hildegardis has a series of similar-sized, enlarged lateral armor plates is rounder and less laterally expanded than was hypothesized. The separate pelvic shield, also carrying a smaller set of lateral armor plates that decrease in size with an anterior/posterior gradient covering mainly the pelvic girdle and the base of the tail. The short tail is armored by four series of armor plates that also show an anterior/posterior gradient of size reduction equivalent to the size reduction of the caudal vertebrae. Until further fossils are recovered, the internal organisation of dermal plates within the two armor shields of C. hildegardis remains little known.

Cyamodus did not have any dorsal spines, although it did have a wing-like elongated flattened lateral spine that served to brace the overlying subdermal carapace. Presumably, the dorsal spines disappeared to provide a closer and better braced association between the vertebrae and the carapace.

== Paleobiology ==
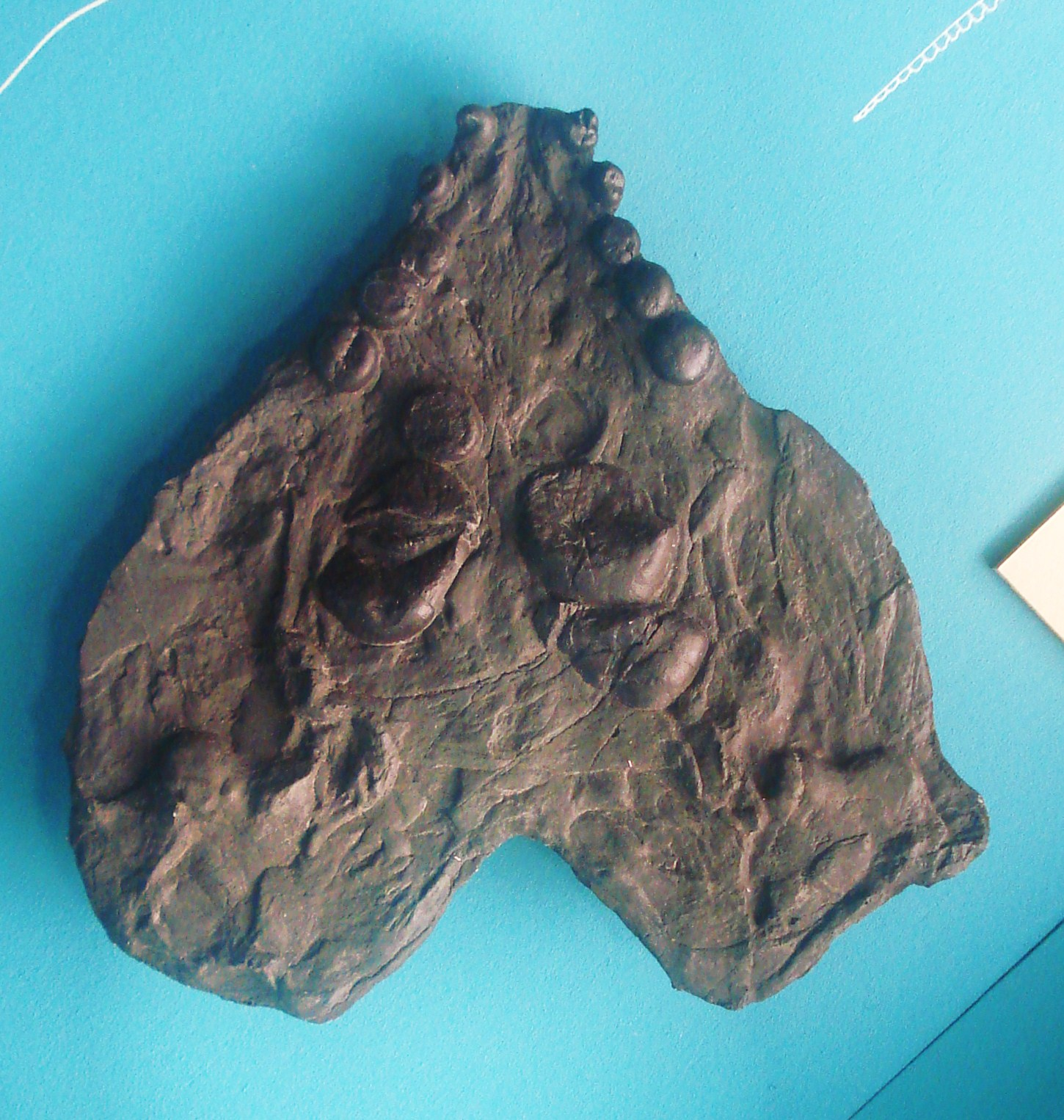
Underside of a C. hildegardis skull

Although the shell would most likely have been too cumbersome for highly adept swimming, Cyamodus would still have been more agile than other single shelled placodonts like Henodus. The shells were also covered in hexagonal plates that not only increased the level of protection but also increased their weight, a typical placodont adaptation as additional weight just beyond the level of neutral buoyancy allowed them to dive to reach shellfish. Other adaptations for protection besides the heavily armored shell include the strongly built rear of the skull and limbs that do not protrude too far. Although the reduction in limb length restricted its ability to swim, its heavy shell greatly assisted its ability to dive. Cyamodus is also expected to have had difficulty maneuvering on land and probably only ventured out of the water for periods of rest. Discovery of two fossil Cyamodus juveniles inside the stomach area of a Lariosaurus fossil has led to speculation about its vulnerability to predation.

It has also been noted that juvenile specimens of Cyamodus have an extra tooth on the roof of their mouth, compared to adult specimens. This suggests that Cyamodus reduced the number of teeth as they grew to maturity. However, this could be due to a difference between species of Cyamodus.

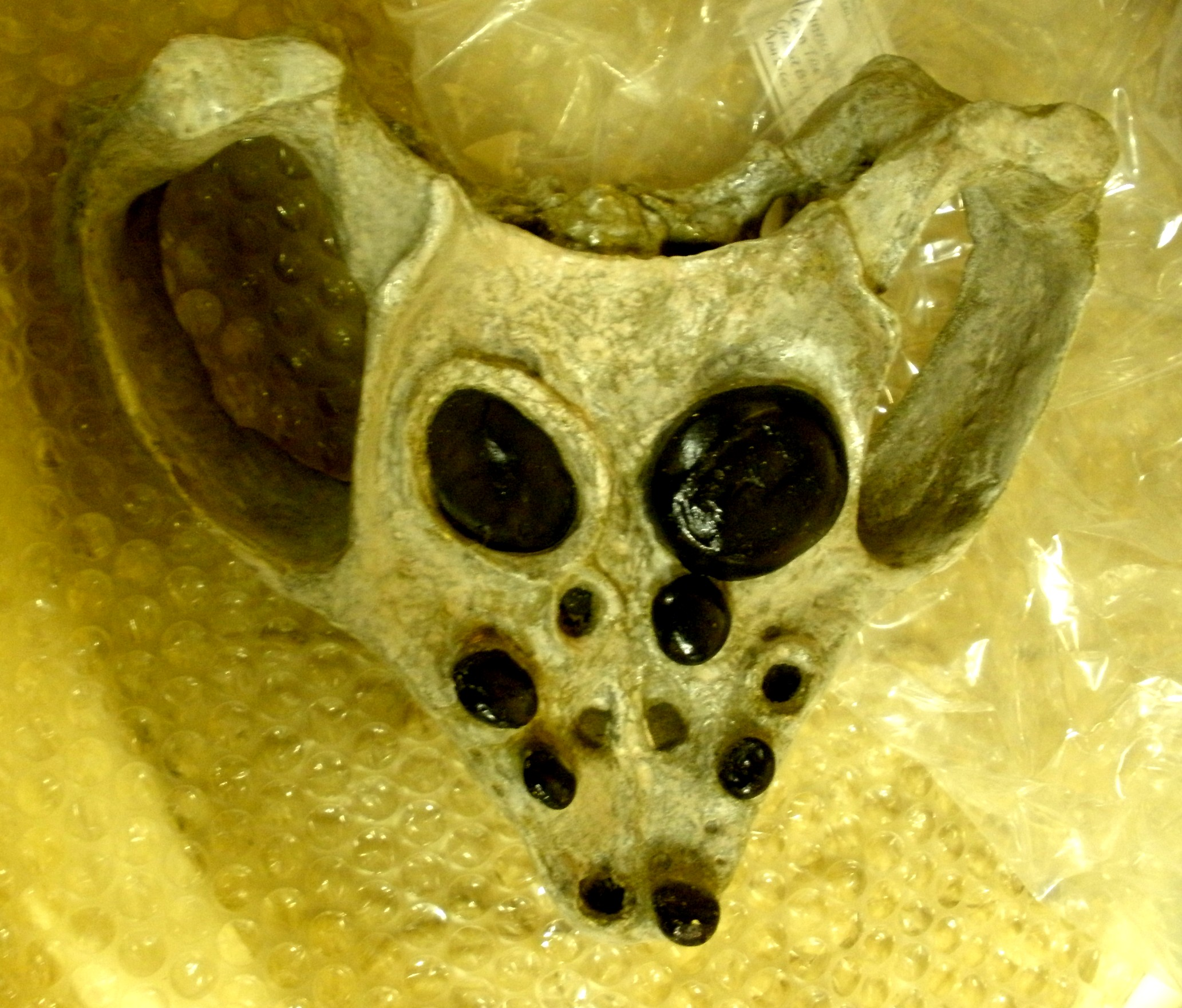
Underside of a C. kuhnschnyderi skull

C. hildegardis from the Besano Formation (Middle Triassic) of the Alpine area of Switzerland and northern Italy has been reconstructed with a broad, laterally expanded main armor (carapace) and a separate smaller pelvic shield, giving it a sprawling appearance. A reexamination of the postcranial dermal armor and endoskeletal elements of the three best preserved articulated specimens of the species has led to new interpretations of the dermal armor and underlying postcranial bones, as well as a new life reconstruction.

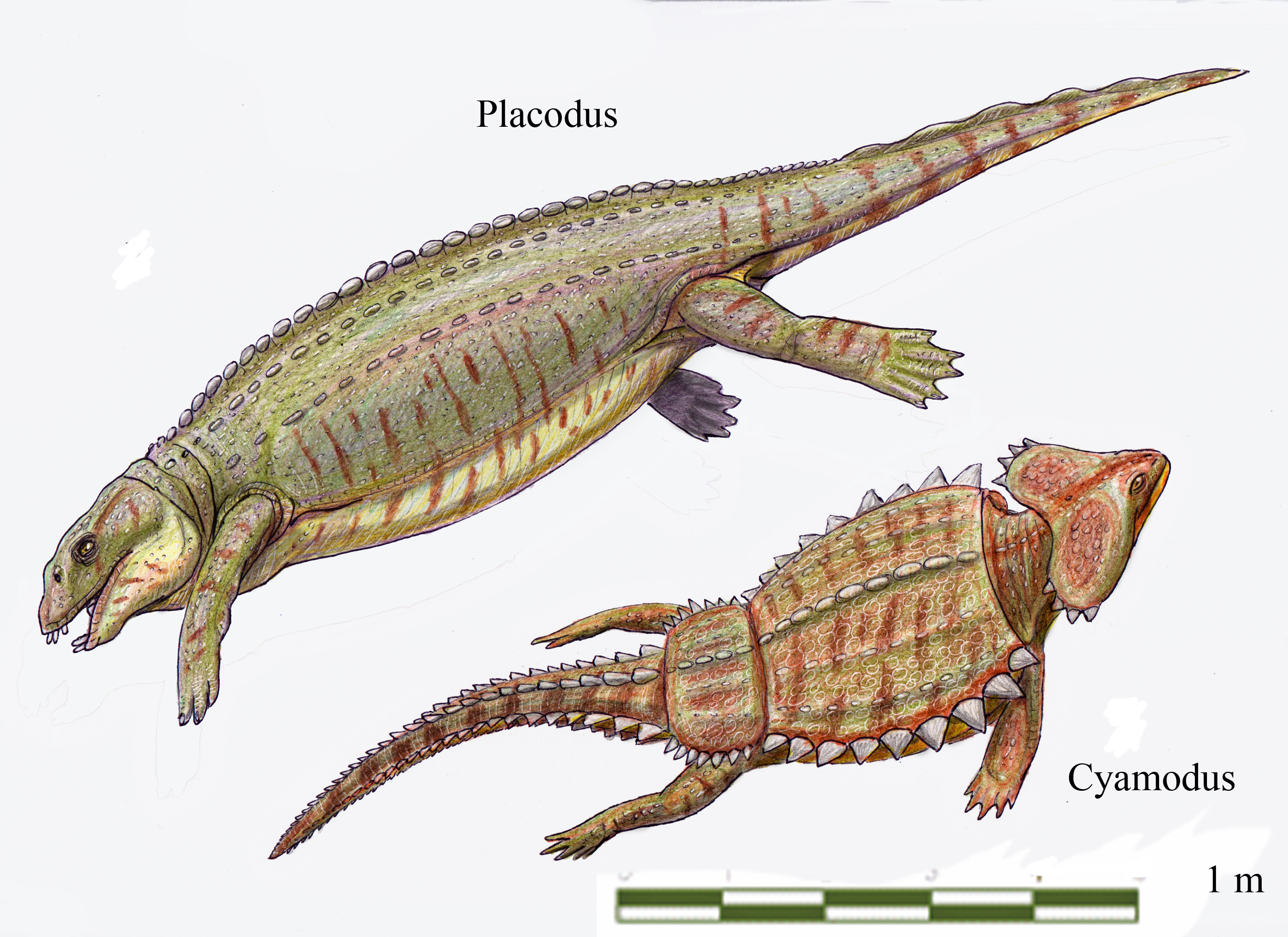
Placodus and Cyamodus

Placodonts are typically considered to be durophagous (adapted to crushing hard-shelled organisms). C.G. Diedrich has suggested that Cyamodus and other placodonts were algae-grazers. However, this interpretation has been criticized by Torsten M. Scheyer and other researchers, and many subsequent studies about placodonts have rejected Deidrich's interpretation, and the consensus that placodonts with the exception of Henodus were durophagous still continues to be strongly supported.
