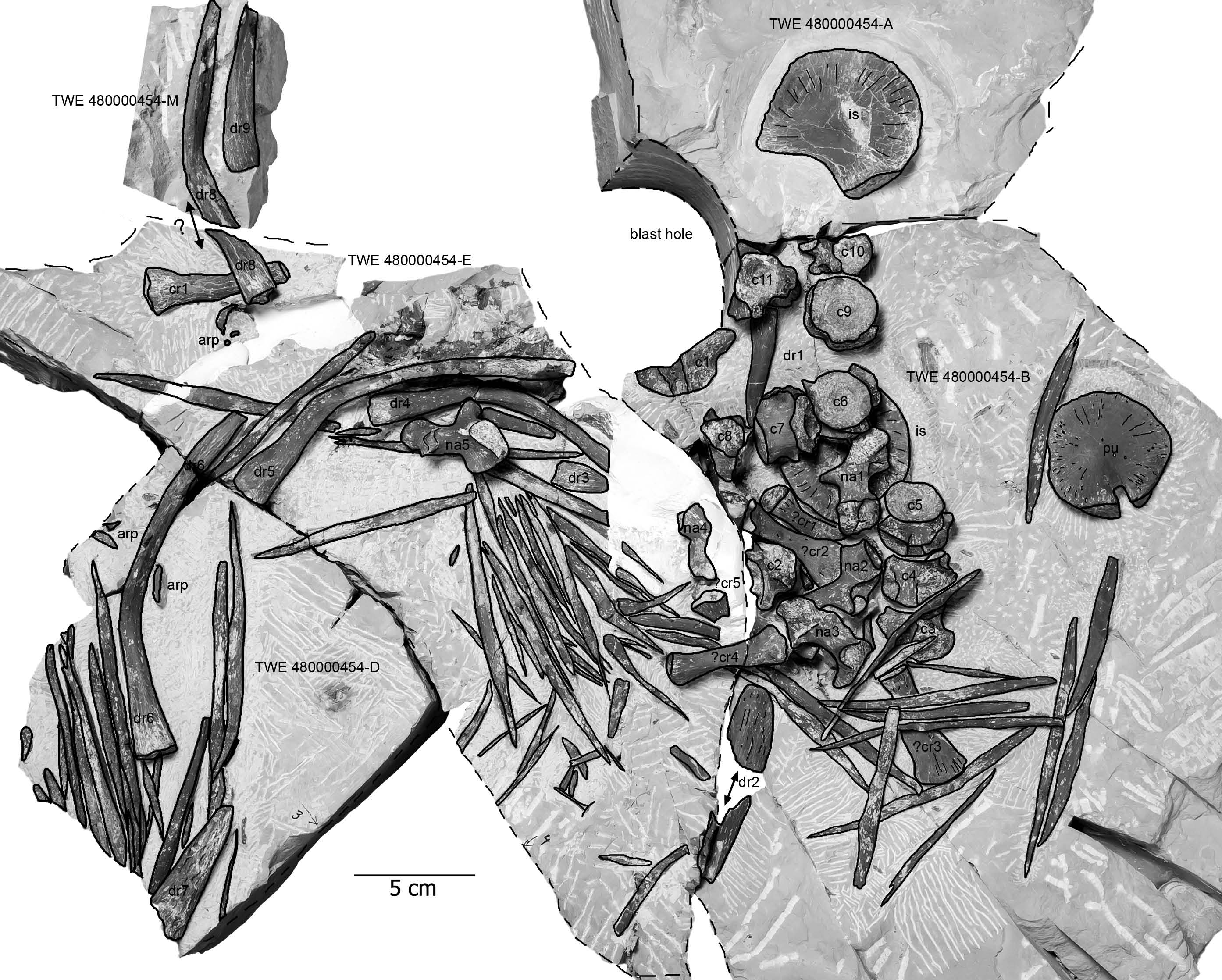
- Holotype

Scientific classification
- Domain: Eukaryota
- Kingdom: Animalia
- Phylum: Chordata
- Class: Reptilia
- Superorder: †Sauropterygia
- Order: †Placodontia
- Genus: †Pararcus; Klein and Scheyer, 2013

Type species
- Pararcus diepenbroeki Klein and Scheyer, 2013

= Pararcus =

Pararcus Temporal range: Middle Triassic, Ladinian

Extinct genus of reptiles

Pararcus is an extinct genus of placodont marine reptile from the Middle Triassic of the Netherlands. The genus is monotypic and the type species is Pararcus diepenbroeki. Pararcus is known from a holotype skeleton about 1.35 metres (4.4 ft) long from the Lower Muschelkalk of Winterswijk.
