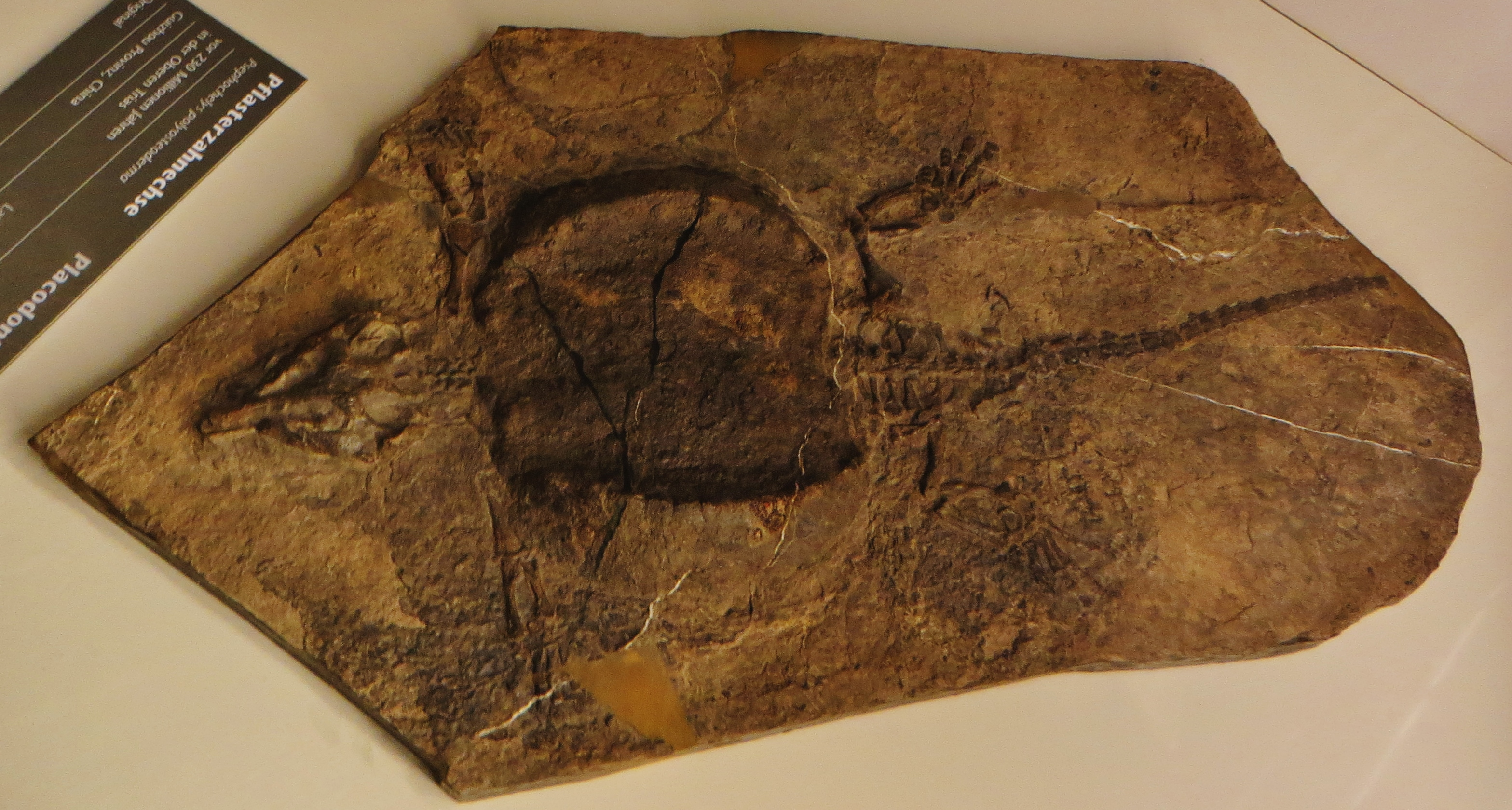
- Fossil specimen

Scientific classification
- Domain: Eukaryota
- Kingdom: Animalia
- Phylum: Chordata
- Class: Reptilia
- Superorder: †Sauropterygia
- Order: †Placodontia
- Family: †Placochelyidae
- Genus: †Psephochelys; Li and Rieppel, 2002

Type species
- †Psephochelys polyosteoderma Li and Rieppel, 2002

= Psephochelys =

Psephochelys Temporal range: Late Triassic

Extinct genus of reptiles

Psephochelys (meaning "pebbly turtle") is an extinct genus of placodont reptile from the Late Triassic of China. It is represented by a single species, Psephochelys polyosteoderma, named in 2002 on the basis of a single partial skeleton found in an outcrop of the Carnian-age Falong Formation in Guizhou Province. Psephochelys is classified as a member of the family Placochelyidae, which is within the larger placodont superfamily Cyamodontoidea. Like other cyamodontoids, Psephochelys has a wide shell covering its body, similar to that of a turtle. However, unlike those of other cyamodontoids, the shell of Psephochelys only covers its back. The plastron, which covers the underside of other cyamodontoids, is absent, and in its place are rib-like gastralia surrounded by loosely connecting osteoderms or bony plates.
