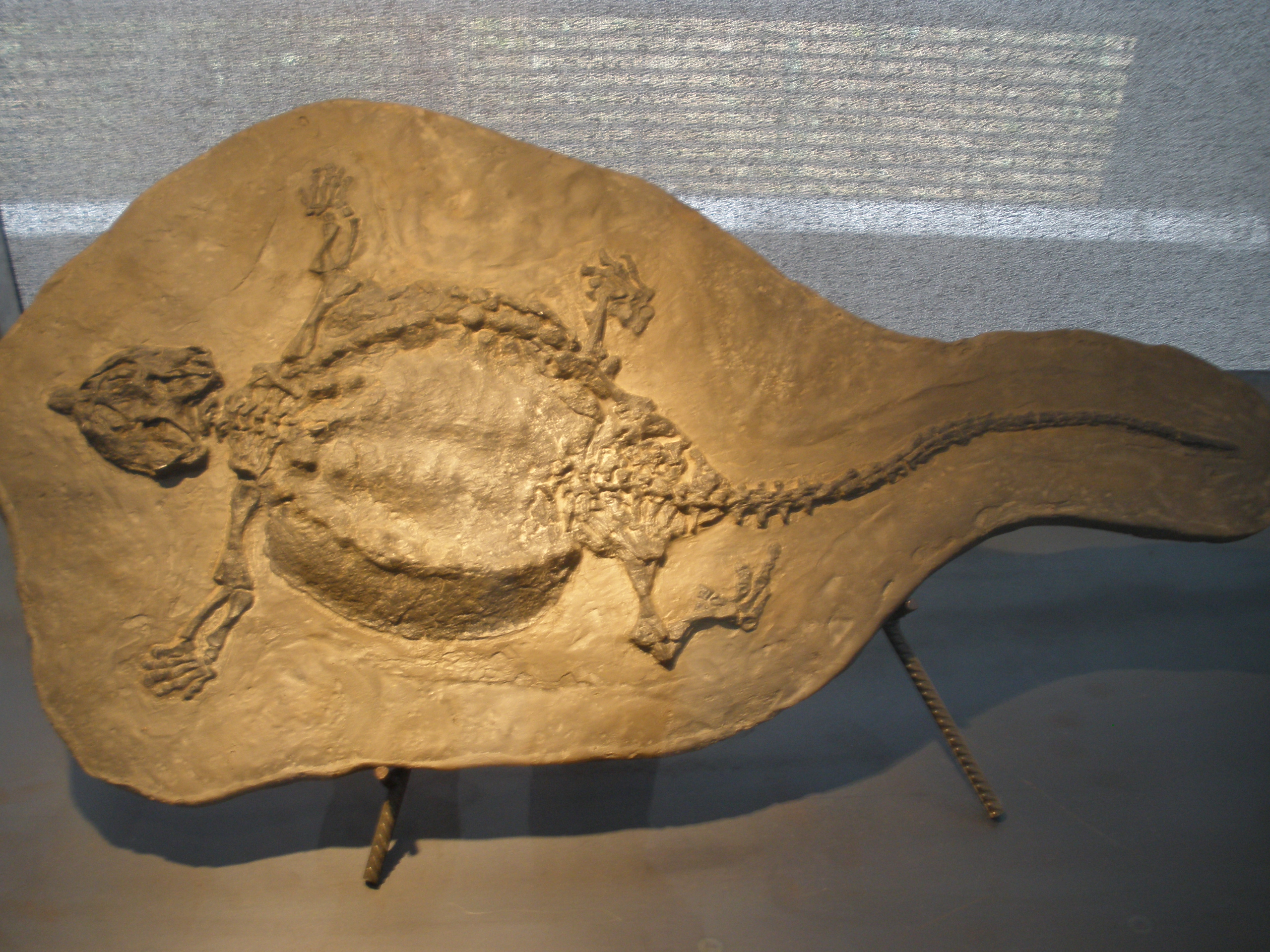
- Fossil skeleton of Cyamodus.

Scientific classification
- Kingdom: Animalia
- Phylum: Chordata
- Class: Reptilia
- Superorder: †Sauropterygia
- Order: †Placodontia
- Superfamily: †Cyamodontoidea
- Family: †Cyamodontidae; Meyer, 1863

Genera
- †Cyamodus; †Protenodontosaurus; †Macroplacus?

= Cyamodontidae =

Cyamodontidae Temporal range: Middle-Late Triassic, 245–227 Ma

Extinct family of marine reptiles

Cyamodontidae is an extinct family of superficially turtle-like placodonts belonging to the superfamily Cyamodontoidea. Fossils have been found in Germany and Italy. It is named after Cyamodus, the namesake of the family.

Meyer (1863) originally created the family solely for Cyamodus. However, the naming of Protenodontosaurus in 1990 by Pinna regrouped the two genera under one family.
