= Psephosauriscus =

Psephosauriscus Temporal range: Middle Triassic, 245–237 Ma

Scientific classification
- Domain: Eukaryota
- Kingdom: Animalia
- Phylum: Chordata
- Class: Reptilia
- Superorder: †Sauropterygia
- Order: †Placodontia
- Superfamily: †Cyamodontoidea
- Genus: †Psephosauriscus; Rieppel, 2002

Species
- †P. mosis (Brotzen, 1957 [originally Psephosaurus mosis) (type); †P. ramonensis Rieppel, 2002; †?P. rhombifer (Haas, 1959 [originally Psephosaurus rhombifer]); †P. sinaiticus (Haas, 1959 [originally Psephosaurus sinaiticus])

Extinct genus of reptiles

Psephosauriscus is an extinct genus of placodont reptile from the Middle Triassic of Israel and Egypt. It is known from bony armor plates that have been found from Makhtesh Ramon in Israel's Negev desert and Araif en Naqua on Egypt's Sinai Peninsula. The genus was erected in 2002 as a replacement name for several species of the genus Psephosaurus, which was named in 1957. It includes the species P. mosis, P. ramonensis, P. sinaiticus, and a possible fourth species, P. rhombifer. All species, with the exception of P. ramonensis, were once assigned to the genus Psephosaurus. Remains of P. mosis and P. ramonensis were found in Makhtesh Ramon, while P. sinaiticus and P. rhombifer were found in Araif en Naqua.

== History ==
Armor of Psephosauriscus is abundant in Middle Triassic limestone in the Sinai and Negev regions, which is comparable to the Muschelkalk of European rock sequences. While the German Muschelkalk contains many nearly complete skeletons of placodonts, the only non-armor skeletal bones from the Middle East are two partial skulls and a fragmentary lower jaw, which cannot be assigned to Psephosauriscus or any other placodont because of their lack of diagnostic features. Remains of Psephosauriscus come from two deposits called the Beneckeia beds and the Ceratites beds, named after their most common ammonite fossils. The Beneckeia beds date back to the Anisian stage of the Middle Triassic, and the Ceratites beds date back to the end of the Anisian and beginning of the Ladinian stage.

Swedish paleontologist F. Brotzen described placodont armor from Makhtesh Ramon in 1957, naming the species Psephosaurus mosis and Psephosaurus picardi from the Beneckeia and Ceratites beds, respectively. P. picardi is now considered a nomen dubium because it was based on an impression of the inner surface of the carapace that did not possess any distinct features. In 1959, Austrian paleontologist Georg Haas named P. sinaiticus and P. rhombifer from Araif en Naqua.

In 2002, paleontologist Olivier Rieppel erected the genus Psephosauriscus to include most of the species named by Brotzen and Haas, which he considered distinct from the type species of Psephosaurus, P. suevicus, named by Eberhard Fraas from the Middle Triassic of Germany. Rieppel noted differences between the armor plates of P. suevicus and the Middle Eastern species that warranted a new genus. However, P. rhombifer could not be assigned with certainty to Psephosauriscus because the holotype specimen described by Haas had since been lost. Rieppel reported additional material from Araif en Naqua that showed similarities to P. rhombifer and the species of Psephosauriscus, which he tentatively described as a species within Psephosauriscus, Psephosauriscus cf. rhombifer. Rieppel also named Psephosauriscus ramonensis as an entirely new species.

== Species ==
The type species of Psephosauriscus, P. mosis, is known from a single specimen including portions of the carapace and plastron. The scutes that cover the armor plates do not have as well-defined a shape as the hexagonal osteoderms that lay underneath them. The osteoderms that form the plastron are relatively large. Some osteoderms have a raised keel. Two distinct ridges along either side of the shell separate the carapace, a lateral wall of smaller osteoderms, and the plastron.

P. ramonensis is known from a partial carapace and connected plastron. The osteoderms of the carapace have smoother edges than most other species of Psephosauriscus, and lack the keel of species like P. mosis. The carapace curves into the lateral wall of the body without a separating ridge as in P. mosis, but a lower ridge does separate the lateral wall from the plastron.

P. sinaiticus is known from several armor fragments and larger pieces of the carapace and plastron. The osteoderms of the carapace and plastron are smaller than those of other species. As in P. mosis, two ridges separate run along the side of the shell.

P. cf. rhombifer can be distinguished from the three other species of Psephosauriscus by the rectangular shape of its scutes. Unlike the smooth shells of other species, the carapace of P. cf. rhombifer has a bumpy surface; each osteoderm is covered in radiating grooves and has a small depression at its center.
