= Protenodontosaurus =

Protenodontosaurus Temporal range: Late Triassic (Carnian), 237–227 Ma

Scientific classification
- Domain: Eukaryota
- Kingdom: Animalia
- Phylum: Chordata
- Class: Reptilia
- Superorder: †Sauropterygia
- Order: †Placodontia
- Superfamily: †Cyamodontoidea
- Family: †Cyamodontidae
- Genus: †Protenodontosaurus; Pinna, 1990

Type species
- Protenodontosaurus italicus Pinna, 1990

Extinct genus of reptile

Protenodontosaurus is an extinct genus of placodont from Italy.
