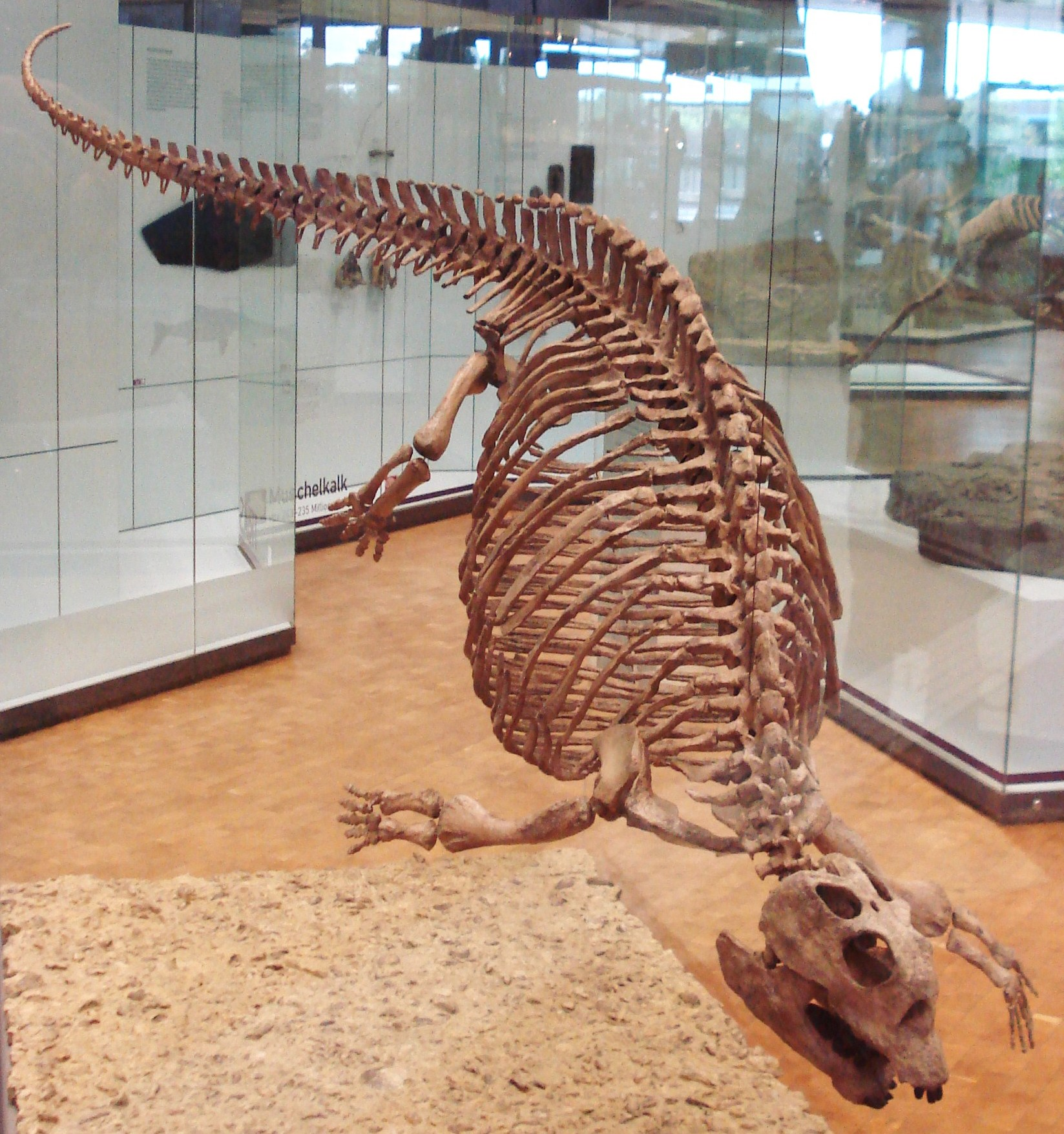
- Placodus gigas

Scientific classification
- Kingdom: Animalia
- Phylum: Chordata
- Class: Reptilia
- Superorder: †Sauropterygia
- Order: †Placodontia
- Family: †Placodontidae; Cope, 1871
- Genus: †Placodus; Agassiz, 1833

Species
- †P. gigas Agassiz, 1833 (type); †P. inexpectatus Jiang et al., 2008

= Placodus =

Placodus Temporal range: Middle Triassic, 245–235 Ma

Extinct genus of reptiles

Placodus (from Greek: plax, plakos, "a plate" and Greek: odous, "tooth") is an extinct genus of marine reptiles belonging to the order Placodontia, which swam in the shallow seas of the middle Triassic period (c. 240 million years ago). Fossils of Placodus have been found in Central Europe (Germany, France, Poland) and China.

== Palaeobiology ==
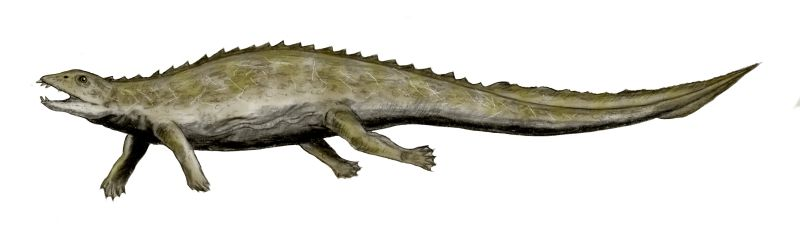
Restoration

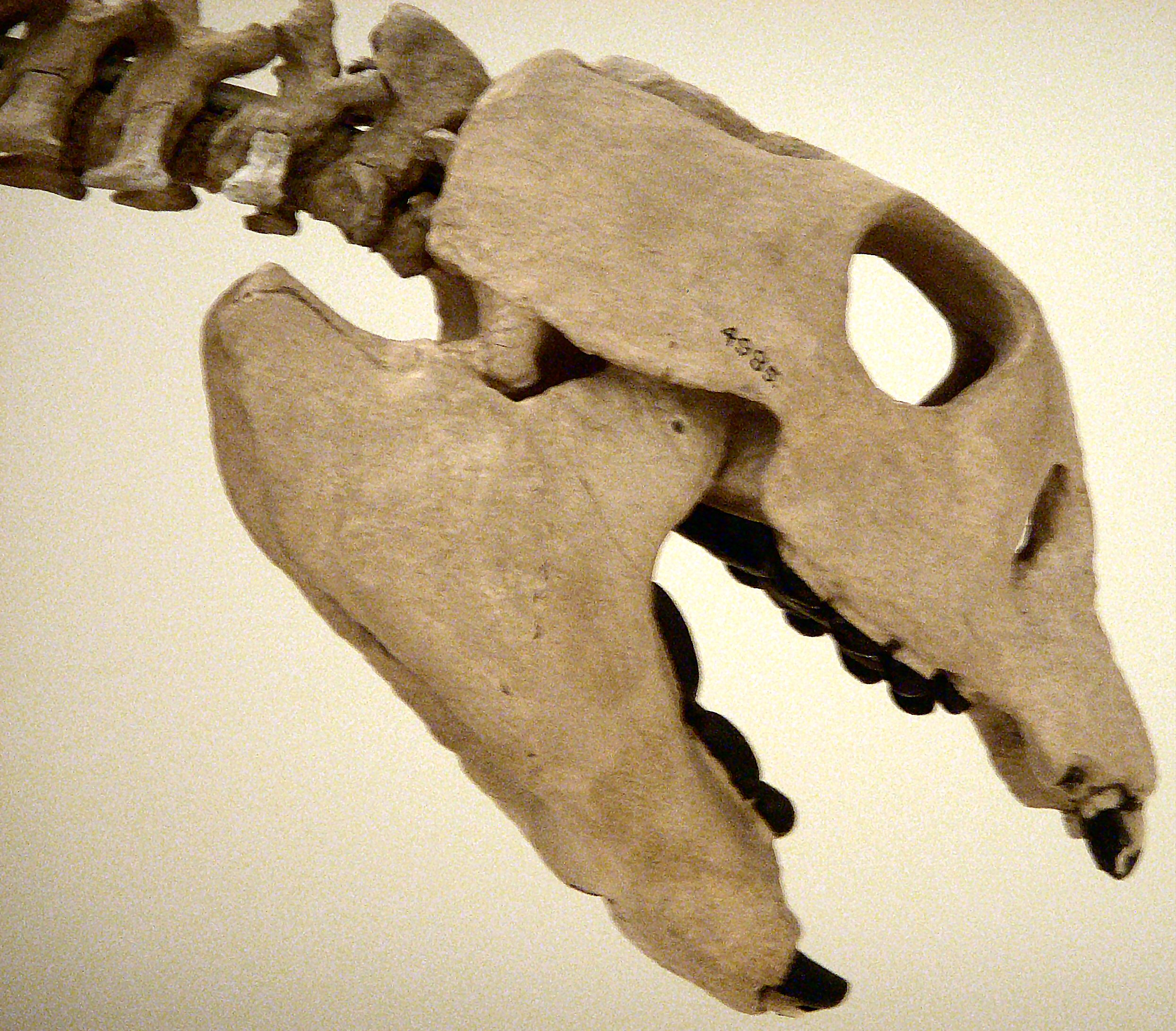
Skull (AMNH 4985)

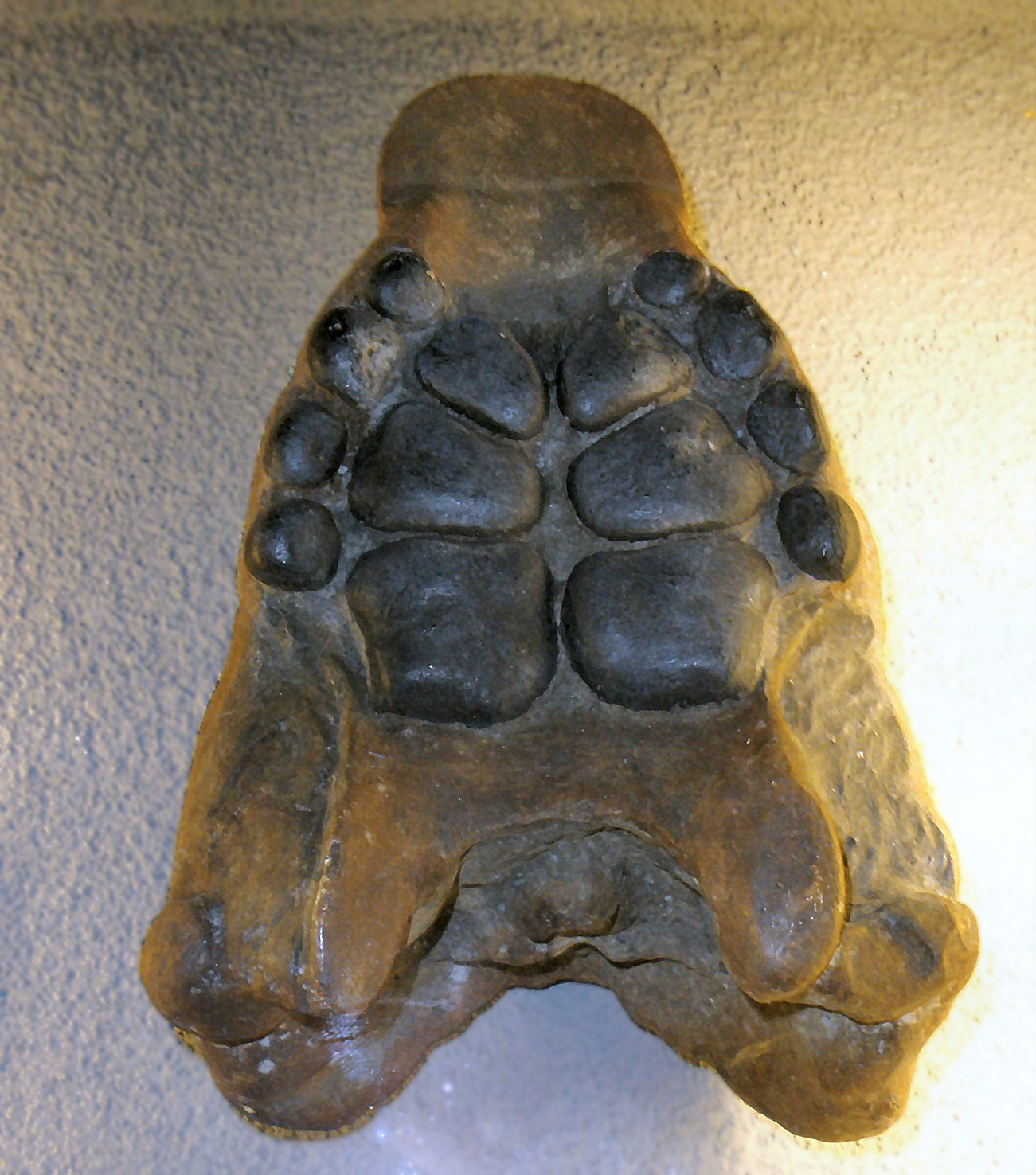
Under surface of the upper jaw and palate of Placodus gigas

Placodus had a stocky body with a long tail, and reached a total length of 2.5–3 m (8.2–9.8 ft). It had a short neck, and a heavy skull. They were specialized for a durophagous diet of shellfish, such as bivalves. Chisel-like incisors protruded from the anterior margin of the snout, and were probably used to pluck hard-shelled benthic prey from the substrate. The back teeth were broad and flattened, and would have helped to crush the prey. Before the animals' anatomy was known, they were regarded as fishes' teeth. Similar smaller teeth were present on the palatine bones.

Placodus and its relatives were not as well-adapted to aquatic life as some later reptile groups, like the closely related plesiosaurs. Their flattened tails and short legs, which probably ended in webbed feet, would have been their main means of propulsion in the water.

The parietal eye on top of the head assisted the animal with orientation, rather than its vision, and its presence is regarded as a primitive characteristic.

The vertebral processes of Placodus dove-tailed into each other and were firmly connected, so that the trunk was rigid. The abdomen was covered with a special armor formed of the bent, right-angled abdominal ribs. Equipped with dense bones, heavy belly ribs, and a row of bony knobs above the backbone, Placodus was a heavily built and negatively buoyant creature that would have had no trouble staying on the seafloor to feed.

This body armour would have offered protection from predators as well, but would have also hampered mobility on land, making Placodus slow and clumsy out of water. It was therefore most likely a terrestrial animal that ventured into the sea in search of food. Molluscs, brachiopods, crustaceans, and other inhabitants of the seabed would have formed its staple diet.
