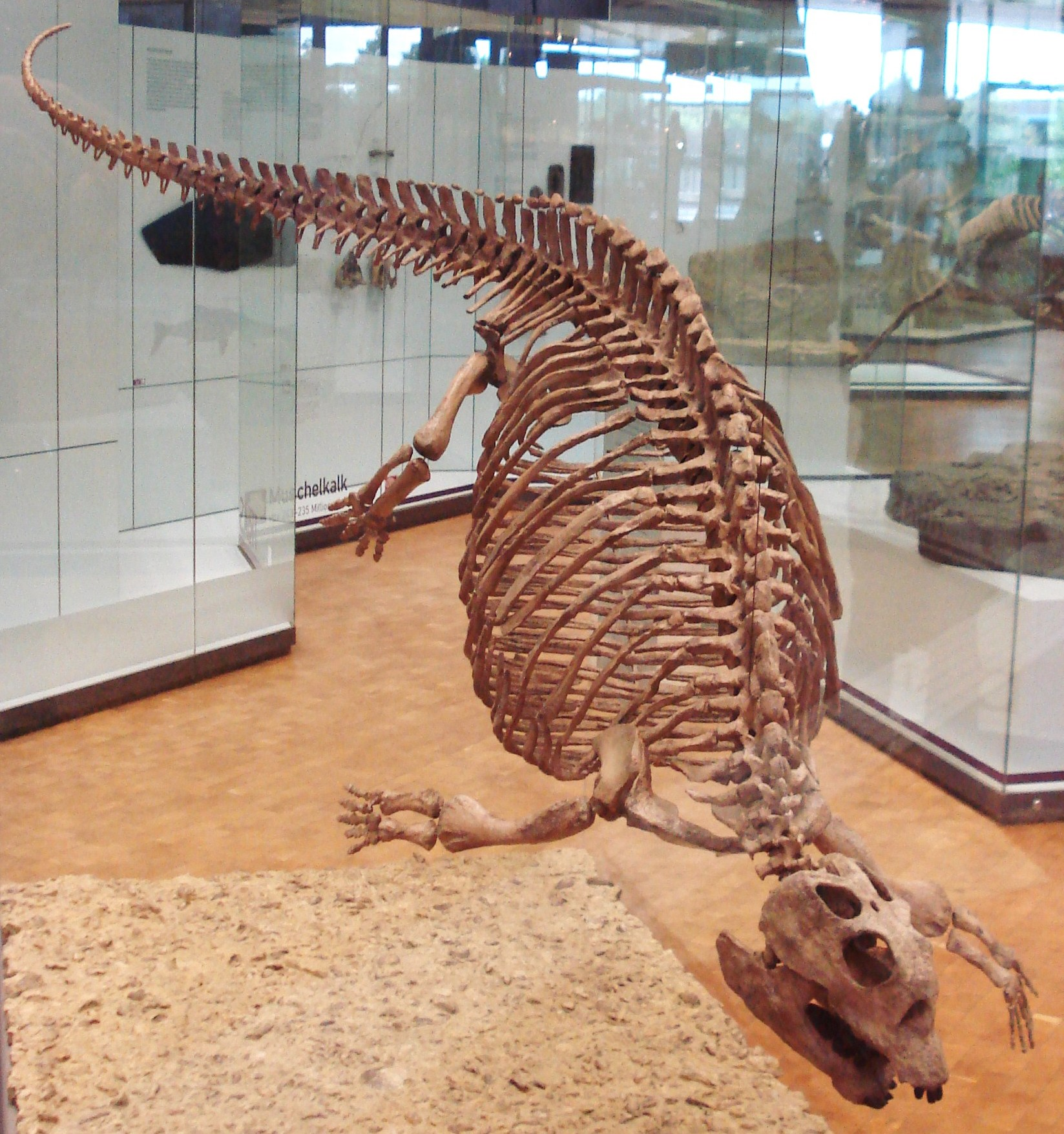
- Placodus, type genus

Scientific classification
- Kingdom: Animalia
- Phylum: Chordata
- Class: Reptilia
- Superorder: †Sauropterygia
- Clade: †Placodontiformes
- Order: †Placodontia; Cope, 1871

Subgroups
- †Atopodentatus?; †Pararcus; †Cyamodontoidea; †Cyamodontidae; †Henodontidae; †Placochelyidae; †Placodontoidea; †Paraplacodus; †Placodus

= Placodontia =

Placodonts Temporal range: Middle to Late Triassic, 245–201.3 Ma

Extinct order of Triassic marine reptiles

Placodonts ("tablet teeth") are an extinct order of marine reptiles that lived during the Triassic period, becoming extinct at the end of the period. They were part of Sauropterygia, the group that includes plesiosaurs. Placodonts were generally between 1 and 2 m (3 ft 3 in and 6 ft 7 in) in length, with some of the largest measuring 3 m (9.8 ft) long.

The first specimen was discovered in 1830. They have been found throughout central Europe, North Africa, the Middle East and China.

== Palaeobiology ==
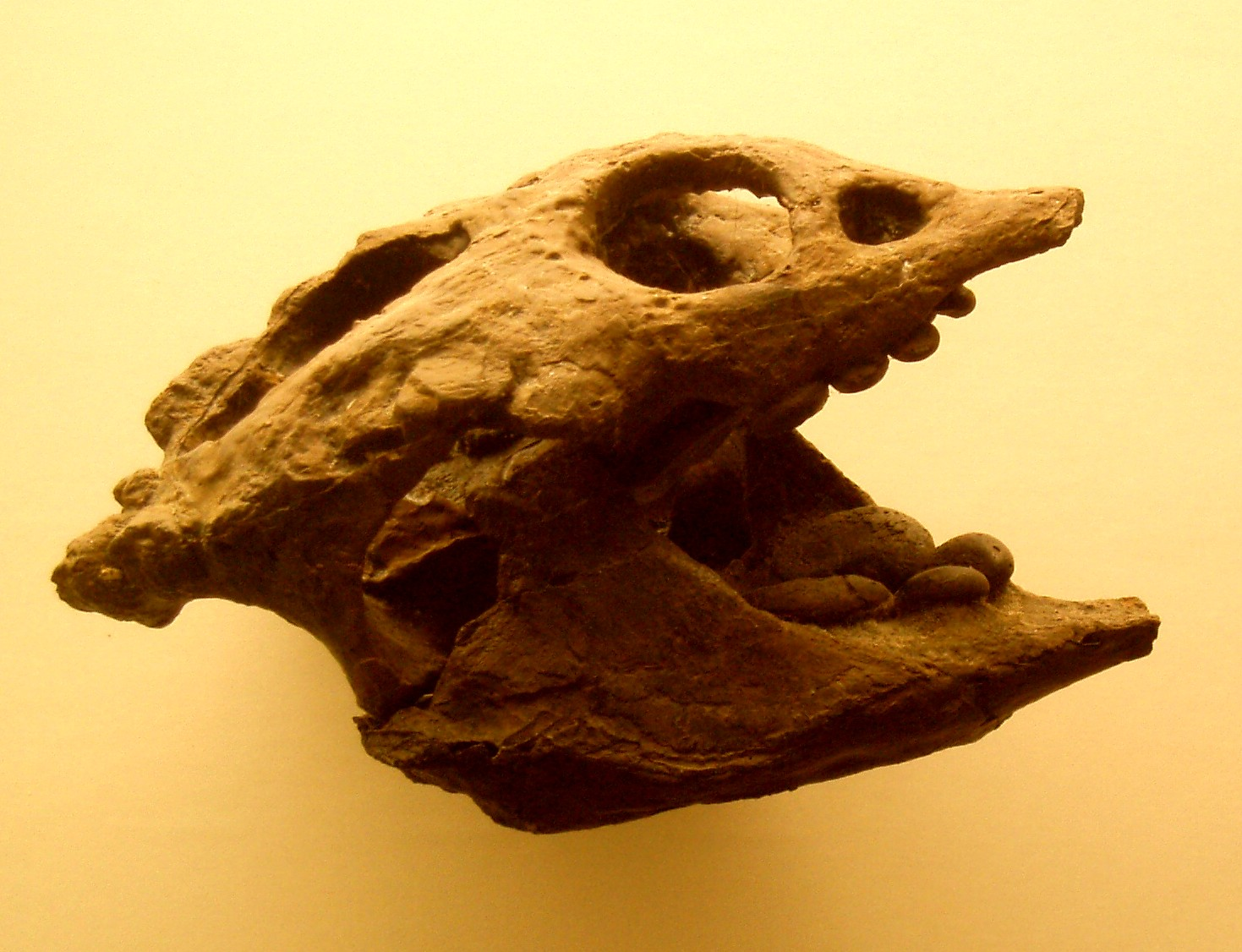
Macroplacus raeticus skull

The earliest forms, like Placodus, which lived in the early to middle Triassic, resembled barrel-bodied lizards superficially similar to the marine iguana of today, but larger. In contrast to the marine iguana, which feeds on algae, the placodonts ate molluscs and so their teeth were flat and tough to crush shells. In the earliest periods, their size was probably enough to keep away the top sea predators of the time: the sharks. However, as time passed, other kinds of carnivorous reptiles began to colonize the seas, such as ichthyosaurs and nothosaurs, and later placodonts developed bony plates on their backs to protect their bodies while feeding. By the Late Triassic, these plates had grown so much that placodonts of the time, such as Henodus and Placochelys, resembled the sea turtles of the modern day more than their ancestors without bony plates. Other placodonts, like Psephoderma, developed plates as well, but in a different articulated manner that resembled the carapace of horseshoe crabs more than those of sea turtles. All these adaptations can be counted as perfect examples of convergent evolution, as placodonts were not related to any of these animals.

Because of their dense bone and heavy armour plating, these creatures would have been too heavy to float in the ocean and would have used a lot of energy to reach the water surface. For this reason, and because of the type of sediment found accompanying their fossils, it is suggested that they lived in shallow waters and not in deep oceans.

The diet of placodonts consisted of marine bivalves, brachiopods, and other hard-shelled invertebrates. They were notable for their large, flat, often protruding teeth, which they used to crush the molluscs and brachiopods that they hunted on the sea bed (another way in which they were similar to walruses). The palate teeth were adapted for this durophagous diet, being extremely thick and large enough to crush thick shell.

Henodus, however, differs from other placodonts in having developed unique baleen-like denticles, which alongside features of the hyoid and jaw musculature suggest that it was a filter feeder. Recent comparisons to Atopodentatus suggest that it was a herbivore as well, bearing a similar broad jaw shape, albeit it obtained plant matter through filter-feeding it from the substrates. The group was once believed to be restricted to the western Tethys, but the discovery of Sinocyamodus xinpuensis in China overturned this view.

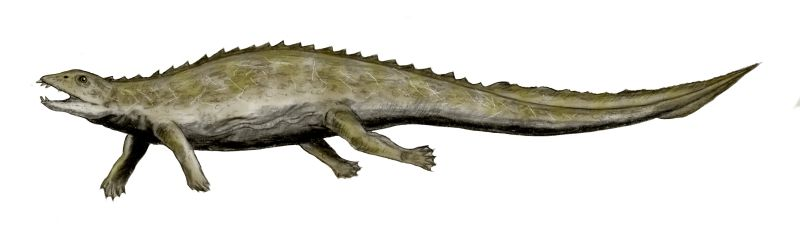
Placodus

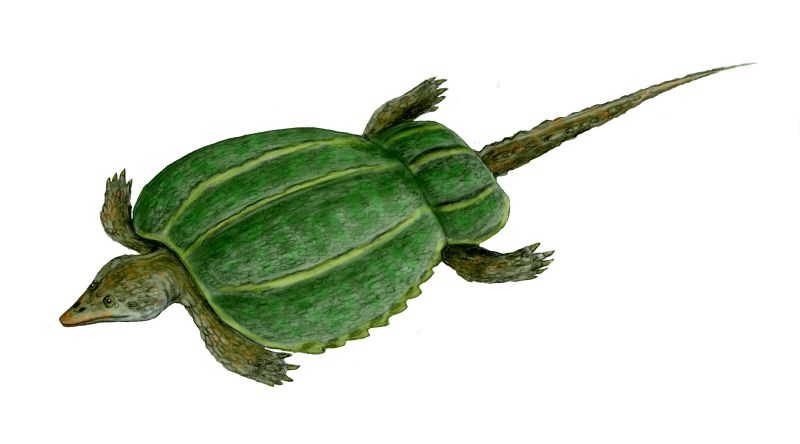
Psephoderma

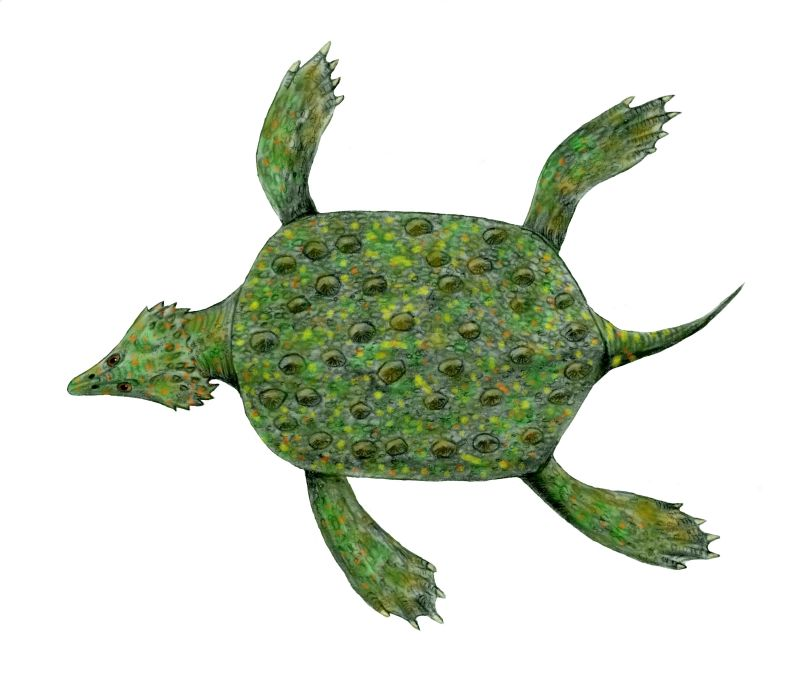
Placochelys

== Classification ==
- Class Reptilia
  - Superorder Sauropterygia
    - Order Placodontia
      - Genus Atopodentatus?
      - Genus Pararcus
      - Superfamily Placodontoidea
        - Family Paraplacodontidae
          - Genus Paraplacodus
        - Family Placodontidae
          - Genus Placodus
      - Superfamily Cyamodontoidea
        - Genus Sinocyamodus
        - Genus Psephosaurus
        - Family Henodontidae
          - Genus Henodus
          - Genus Parahenodus
        - Family Cyamodontidae
          - Genus Cyamodus
          - Genus Protenodontosaurus
        - Family Placochelyidae
          - Genus Glyphoderma
          - Genus Placochelys
          - Genus Psephosauriscus
          - Genus Psephochelys
          - Genus Psephoderma

Additionally, the name Placodontiformes was erected for the clade that includes Palatodonta and Placodontia. Palatodonta, from the early Middle Triassic of the Netherlands, was a marine sauropterygian that was very similar to placodonts, but Palatodonta has teeth that are small and pointed instead of broad and flat.

The clade Helveticosauroidea was previously considered to be a basal superfamily of placodonts with the sole member Helveticosaurus. However, it is now thought that Helveticosaurus was not a placodont but possibly an unusual member of the Archosauromorpha.

=== Phylogeny ===
The cladogram below follows the result found by Rainer Schoch and Hans-Dieter Sues in 2015.

- Sauria (=Archelosauria)
  - Archosauromorpha
  - Lepidosauromorpha (=Ankylopoda)
    - - - †Kuehneosauridae
        - Lepidosauria
          - Squamata
          - Rhynchocephalia
      - Pantestudines
        - †Sauropterygia
          - †Eosauropterygia
          - - †Sinosaurosphargis
            - †Placodontia
        - - †Eunotosaurus
          - - †Pappochelys
            - - †Odontochelys
              - Testudinata
                - †Proganochelys
                - Testudines

== Sources ==
- Bardet, N. (1995). "Evolution et extinction des reptiles marins au cours du Mesozoique". Palaeovertebrata (24): 177–283.
- Huene, F. von (1933). "Die Placodontier. 4. Zur Lebensweise und Verwandtschaft von Placodus". Abhandlungen der Senckenbergischen Naturforschenden Gesellschaft (in German) (38): 365–382.
- Mazin, J.-M. (1986). "Negevodus ramonensis n. g. n. sp., un nouveau placodonte du Trias moyen du Negev (Israel)". 302. Comptes Rendus de l'Académie des Sciences, Série II: 927–929.
- Mazin, J.-M. (1989). "La denture et la région palatine des Placodontia (Reptilia, Trias). Implications phylogénétiques". Geobios (in French). 22 (6): 725–734. Bibcode:1989Geobi..22..725M. doi:10.1016/s0016-6995(89)80069-5.
- Mazin, J.-M. & Pinna, G. (1993). "Palaeoecology of the armoured placodonts". Paleontologia Lombarda. New Series. 2: 83–91.
- Nosotti, S. & Pinna, G. (1993a). "Cyamodus kuhn-schnyderi n. sp., nouvelle espèce de Cyamodontidae (Reptilia, Placodontia) du Muschelkalk supérieur allemand". Comptes Rendus de l'Académie des Sciences, Série II. 317: 847–850.
- Nosotti, S. & Pinna, G. (1993b). "New data on placodont skull anatomy". Paleontologia Lombarda. New Series. 2: 109–114.
- Owen, R (1858). "Description of the skull and teeth of the Placodus laticeps, Owen, with indications of other new species of Placodus, and evidence of the saurian nature of that genus". Philosophical Transactions of the Royal Society of London. 148: 169–184. doi:10.1098/rstl.1858.0009. S2CID 111331431.
- Peyer, B. & Kuhn-Schnyder, E. (1955). "Placodontia". In Piveteau, J. (ed.). Traite de Paleontologie. Vol. V. Paris: Masson et Cie. pp. 459–468.
- Rieppel, O. (1995). "The genus Placodus: systematics, morphology, paleobiogeography and paleobiology". Fieldiana Geology. New Series. 31: 1–44.
- Rieppel, O. C. & Zanon, R. T. (1997). "The interrelationships of Placodontia" (PDF). Historical Biology. 12 (3–4): 211–227. Bibcode:1997HBio...12..211R. doi:10.1080/08912969709386564.
- Rieppel, O. C. (2000). "Paraplacodus and the phylogeny of the Placodontia (Reptilia: Sauropterygia)". Zoological Journal of the Linnean Society. 130 (4): 635–659. doi:10.1111/j.1096-3642.2000.tb02204.x.
- Sues, H.-D. (1987). "On the skull of Placodus gigas and the relationships of the Placodontia". Journal of Vertebrate Paleontology. 7 (2): 138–144. Bibcode:1987JVPal...7..138S. doi:10.1080/02724634.1987.10011648.
- Westphal, F. (1976). "The dermal armour of some Triassic placodont reptiles". In Bellairs, A. d'A. & Cox, C. B. (eds.). Morphology and Biology of Reptiles. London: Academic Press.
- Zanon, R. T. (1989). "Paraplacodus and the diapsid origin of Placodontia". Journal of Vertebrate Paleontology. 9: 47A. doi:10.1080/02724634.1989.10011786.
- Zanon, R. T. (1991). "Negevodus ramonensis Mazin, 1986, reinterpreted as a temnospondyl, not a placodont". Journal of Vertebrate Paleontology. 11 (4): 515–518. Bibcode:1991JVPal..11..515Z. doi:10.1080/02724634.1991.10011419.
