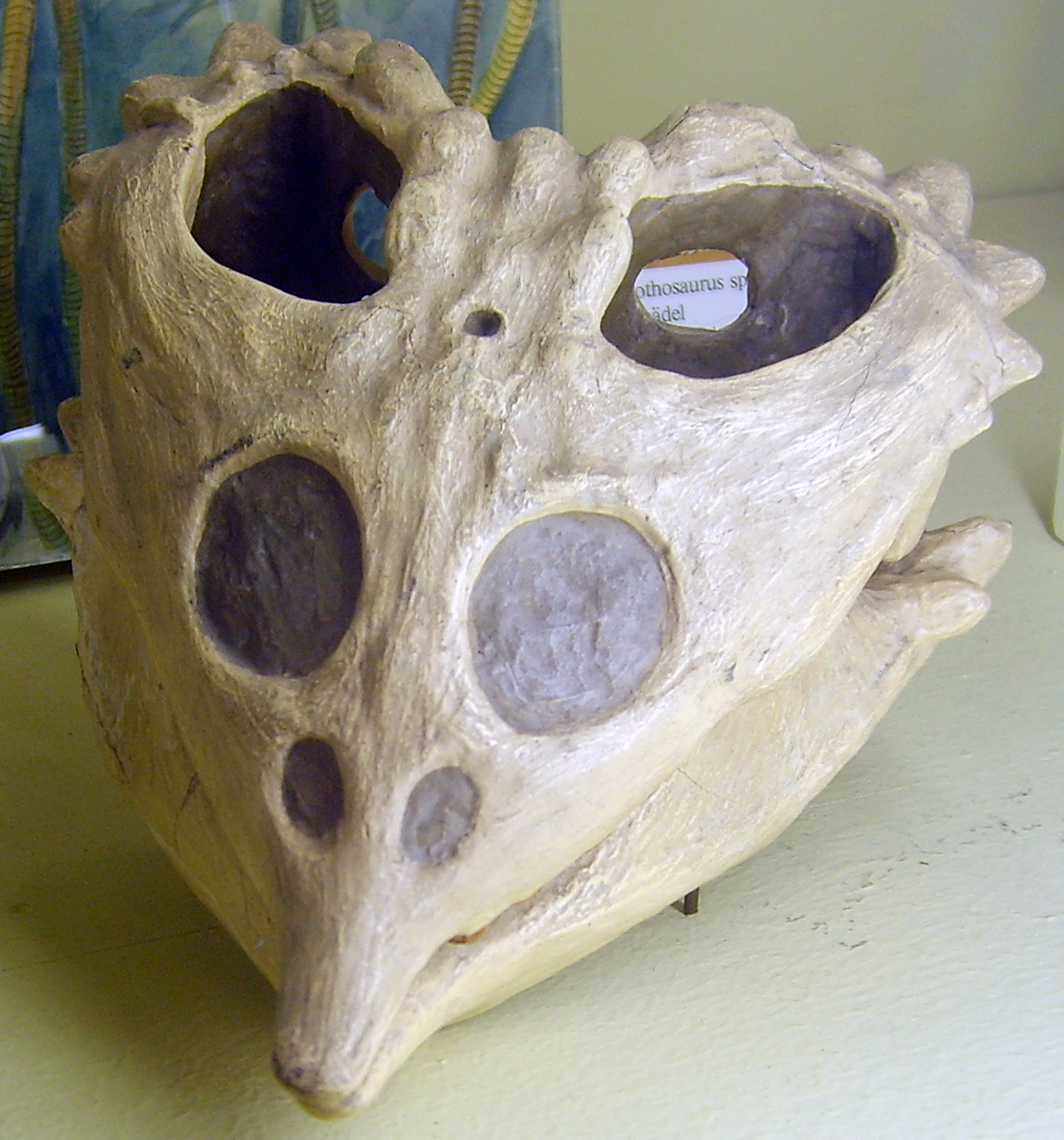
- Restored Placochelys placodonta skull at the Museum für Naturkunde, Berlin

Scientific classification
- Kingdom: Animalia
- Phylum: Chordata
- Class: Reptilia
- Superorder: †Sauropterygia
- Order: †Placodontia
- Family: †Placochelyidae
- Genus: †Placochelys; Jaekel, 1902

= Placochelys =

Placochelys Temporal range: Late Triassic (Norian to Rhaetian), 221.5–205.6 Ma

Extinct genus of reptiles

Placochelys (from Greek: plax, plakos, "plate" and Greek: chelys, "tortoise") is an extinct genus of placodont reptiles erected by Otto Jaekel in 1902.

== Fossil records ==
Fossils of Placochelys dates back to the Triassic period (age range: 221.5 to 205.6 million years ago). They have been found in Germany, Austria, Hungary and Italy.

== Species ==
This genus includes only one species:

- Placochelys placodonta Jaekel, 1902 (from Upper Ladinian of Hungary)

== Description ==
Placochelys looked remarkably similar to a sea turtle, and grew to about 90 centimetres (3.0 ft) in length. It had a flat turtle-like carapace covered with knobbly plates, and a compact triangular skull. Its beaked skull had powerful muscles. It had only two pairs of palatal teeth, a large posterior pair, and a small rostral pair. The specialized broad teeth on the palate, were most likely used for crushing shellfish and hard-shelled prey. Its limbs were paddle-shaped for swimming, although, unlike modern sea turtles, they still had discernable toes, and it also had a short tail.

== Gallery ==
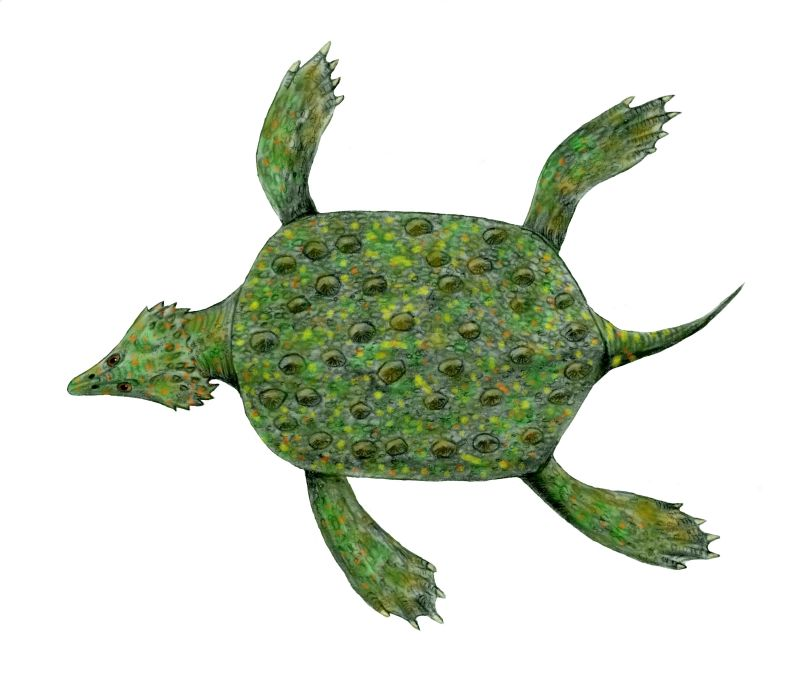
Life restoration of Placochelys

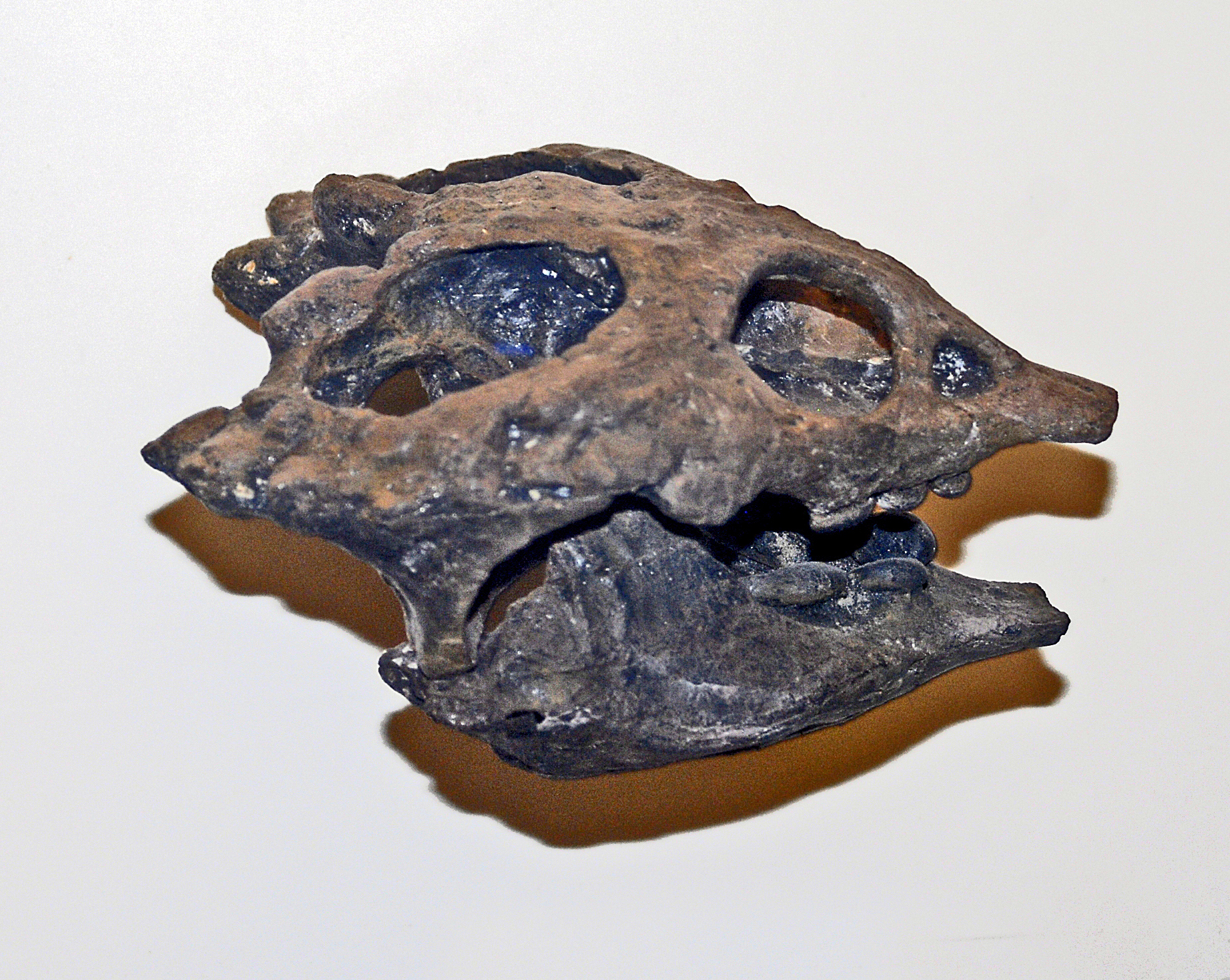
Placochelys placodonta fossil skull, lateral view

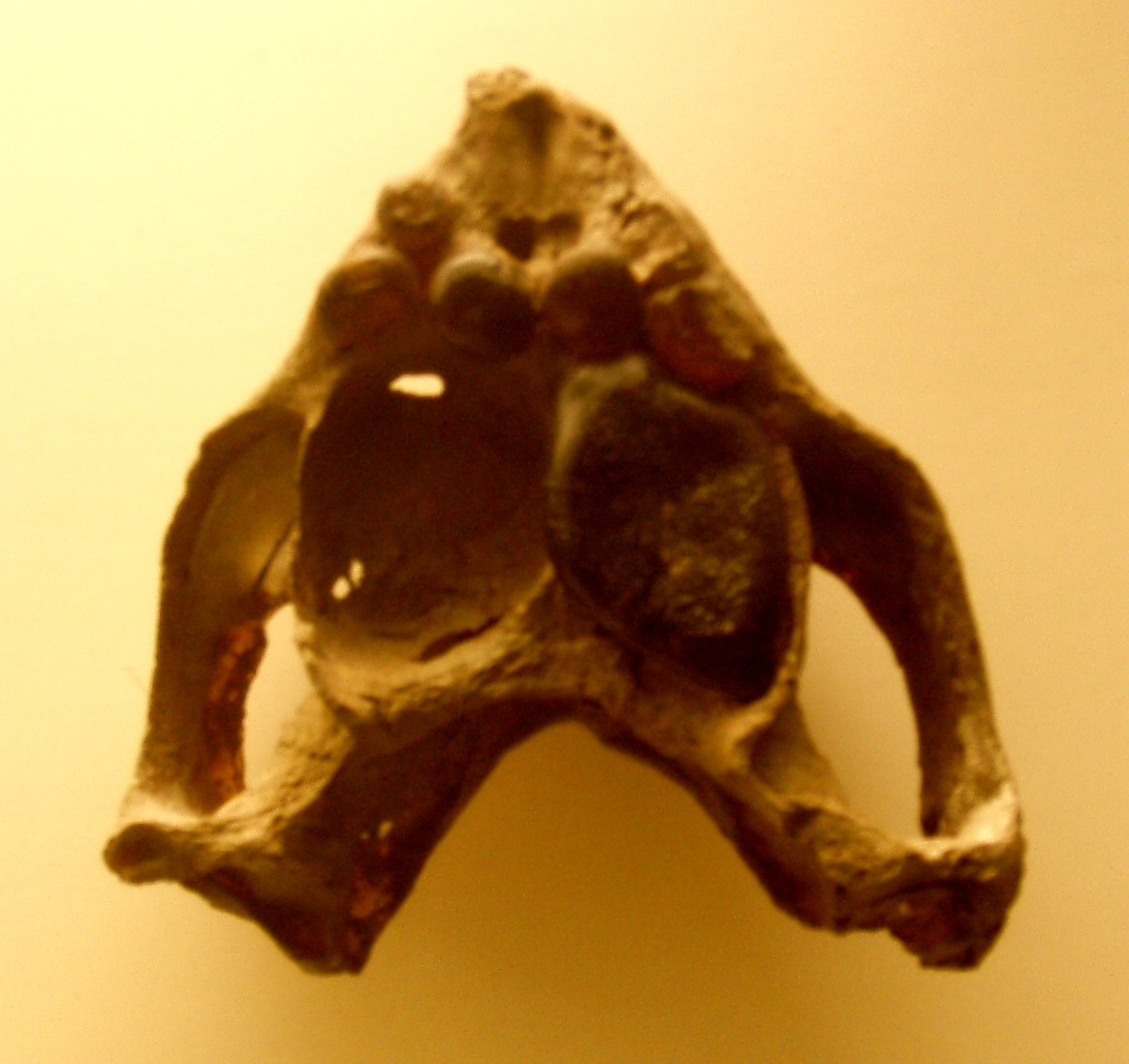
Placochelys placodonta skull seen from below

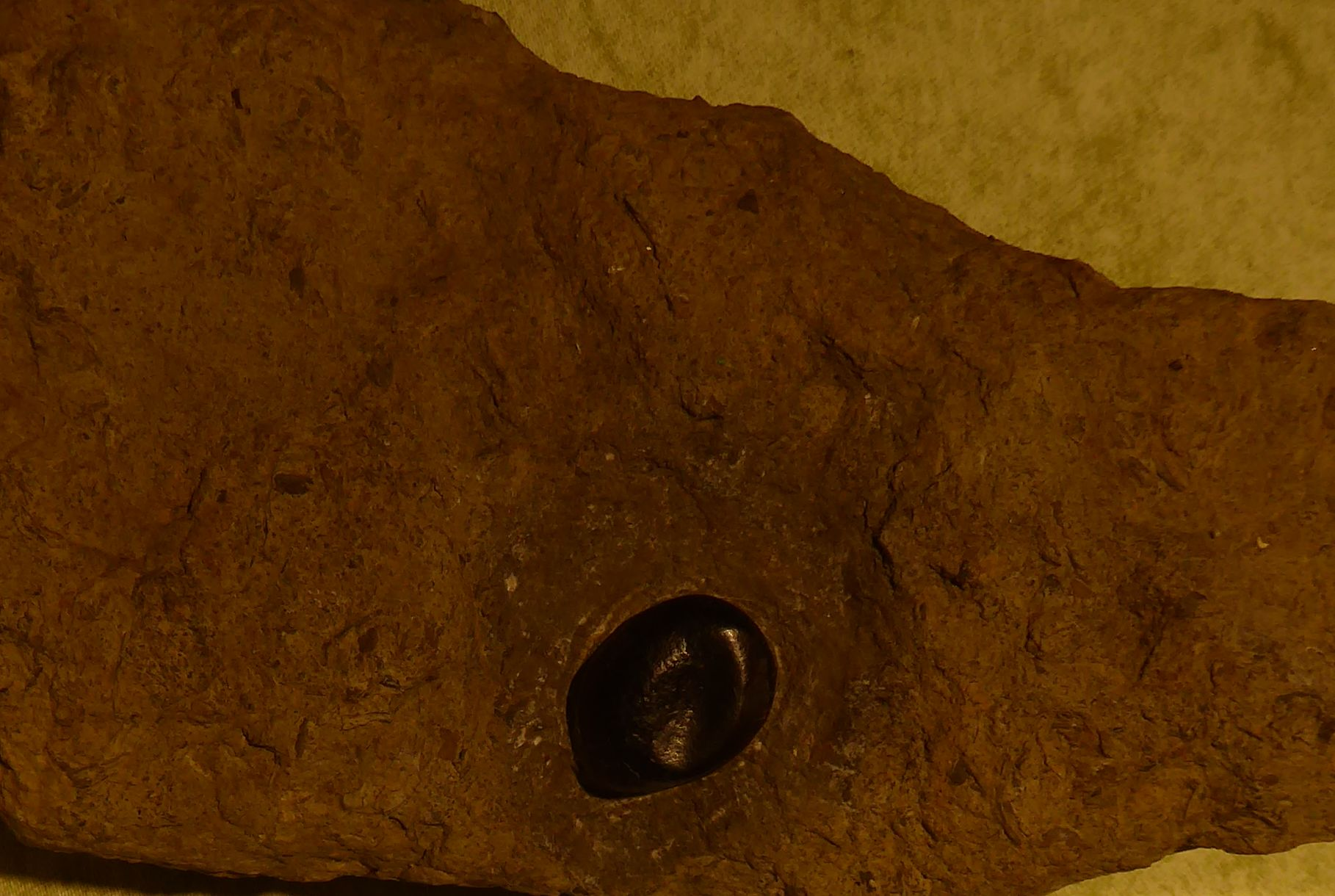
Placochelys tooth from Adnet, Austria

== Bibliography ==
- Jaekel O. 1902. Über Placochelys n. g. und ihre Beeutung fur die Stammesgeschichte der Schildkroten: Neues Jahrbuch für Mineralogie, Geologie und Palaontologie, Abhandlungen, 1902: 127–144.
- Mazin, J.-M. and Pinna, G. 1993. Palaeoecology of the armoured placodonts. Paleontologia Lombarda, N. S. 2: 83–91.
- Rieppel O. and Zanon R.T. 1997. The interrelationships of Placodontia. Historical Biology: Vol. 12, pp. 211–227
- Yin G., in Yin, G., Zhou, X., Cao, Z., Yu, Y, and Luo, Y., 2000, A preliminary study on the Early Late Triassic marine reptiles from Guanling Guizhou, China.
- Rieppel O. 2001. The Cranial Anatomy of Placochelys placodonta Jaekel, 1902, And a Review of the Cyamodontoidea (reptilia, Placodonta) Fieldiana: Geology, New Series, No. 45:1-101.
- Rieppel, O., 2002, The dermal armor of the cyamodontoid placodonts (Reptilia, Sauropterygia): morphology and systematic value: Fieldiana; Geology, new series, n. 46, p. 1-41pp.
