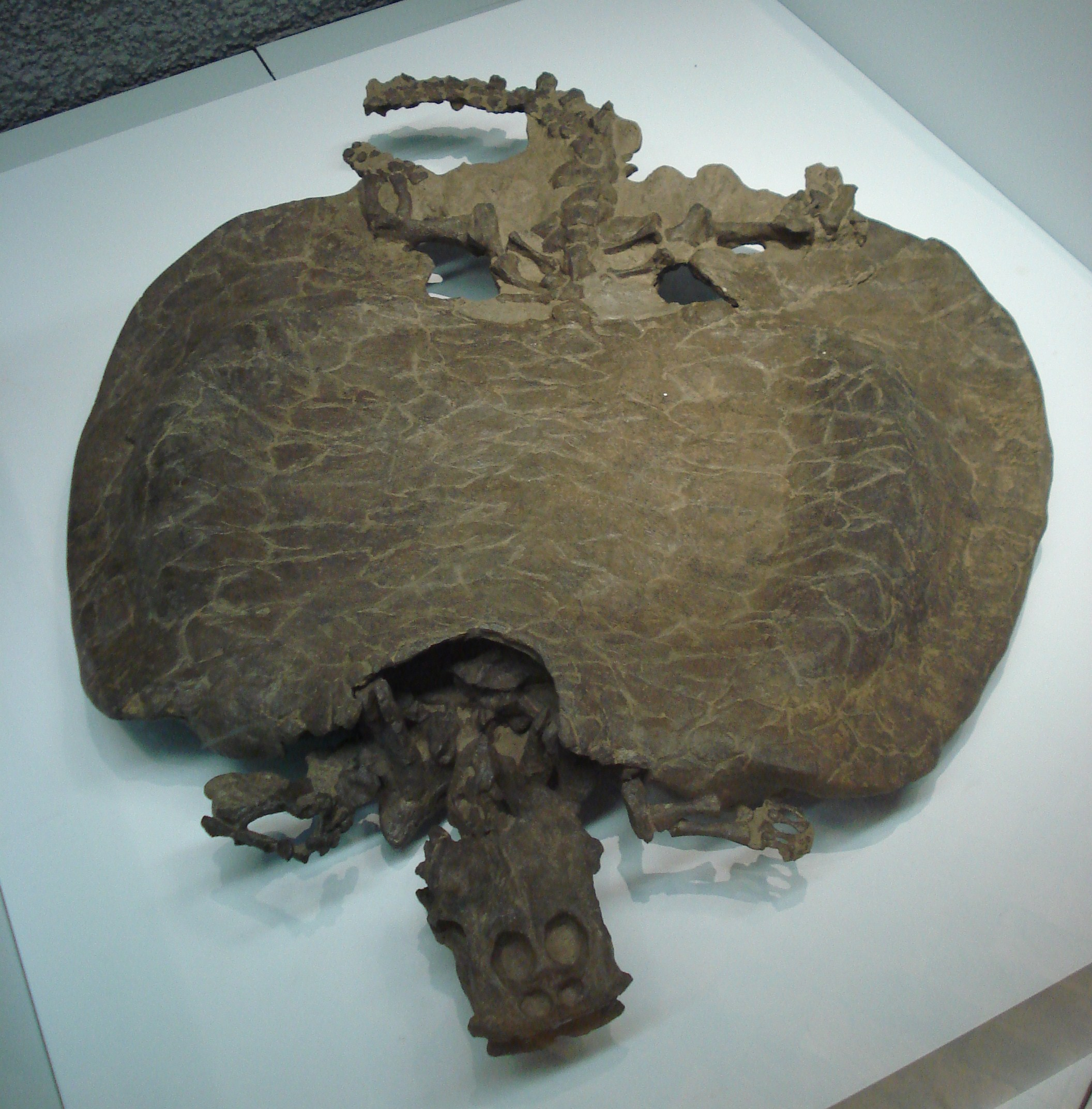
- Fossil of Henodus chelyops in the Staatliches Museum für Naturkunde Stuttgart

Scientific classification
- Domain: Eukaryota
- Kingdom: Animalia
- Phylum: Chordata
- Class: Reptilia
- Superorder: †Sauropterygia
- Order: †Placodontia
- Superfamily: †Cyamodontoidea; Nopsca, 1923

Families
- †Cyamodontidae; †Henodontidae; †Placochelyidae

= Cyamodontoidea =

Cyamodontoidea Temporal range: Triassic

Extinct superfamily of reptiles

Cyamodontoidea is an extinct superfamily of placodont marine reptiles from the Triassic period. It is one of the two main groups of placodonts, the other being Placodontoidea. Cyamodontoids are distinguished from placodontoids by their large shells, formed from fused bony plates called osteoderms and superficially resembling the shells of turtles. Cyamodontoids also have distinctive skulls with narrow, often toothless jaws and wide, flaring temporal regions behind the eyes. Two large temporal openings are positioned at the top of the back of the skull, an arrangement that is known as the euryapsid condition and seen throughout Sauropterygia, the marine reptile group to which placodonts belong. Cyamodontoids are also distinguished by their large crushing teeth, which grow from the palatine bones on the roof of the mouth.

== Description ==
=== Shell ===
The shells of cyamodontoids differ from those of turtles in several ways. Turtle shells are fused to their skeletons in several regions, including the vertebrae, ribs, gastralia (belly ribs), and pectoral girdles, but cyamodontoid shells overlie skeletal bones without any fusion. Turtle shells are also composed of two layers of osteoderms, while cyamodontoid shells only have one layer. Cyamodontoids typically have more osteoderms forming their carapaces and plastrons (upper and lower shells) than do turtles, and the osteoderms have less well-defined shapes than the geometric scutes of turtles.

== History ==
The division of placodonts into two groups was first proposed in 1863 by German paleontologist Christian Erich Hermann von Meyer, who named Macrocephali ("large skulls") and Platycephali ("flat skulls"). Macrocephali would later be known as Placodontoidea, and Platycephali would later become Cyamodontoidea. Complete skeletons of placodonts were not known at the time of von Meyer's proposed classification, and the large shells of cyamodontoids were unknown.
