= List of sedimentary formations in Germany =

This is a list of all the sedimentary formations that are found in Germany.

| Name | Age |
|---|---|
| Buntsandstein | Triassic |
| Flammenmergel | |
| Germanic Trias Supergroup | Triassic |
| Keuper | Triassic |
| Klerf Formation | Devonian |
| Lias Group | Early Jurassic |
| Muschelkalk | Triassic |
| Posidonia Shale | Lower Jurassic |
| Rotliegend | Permian |
| Solnhofen Plattenkalk | Jurassic |
| Zechstein | Permian |

== See also ==
- Geology of Germany
