= Geology of Germany =

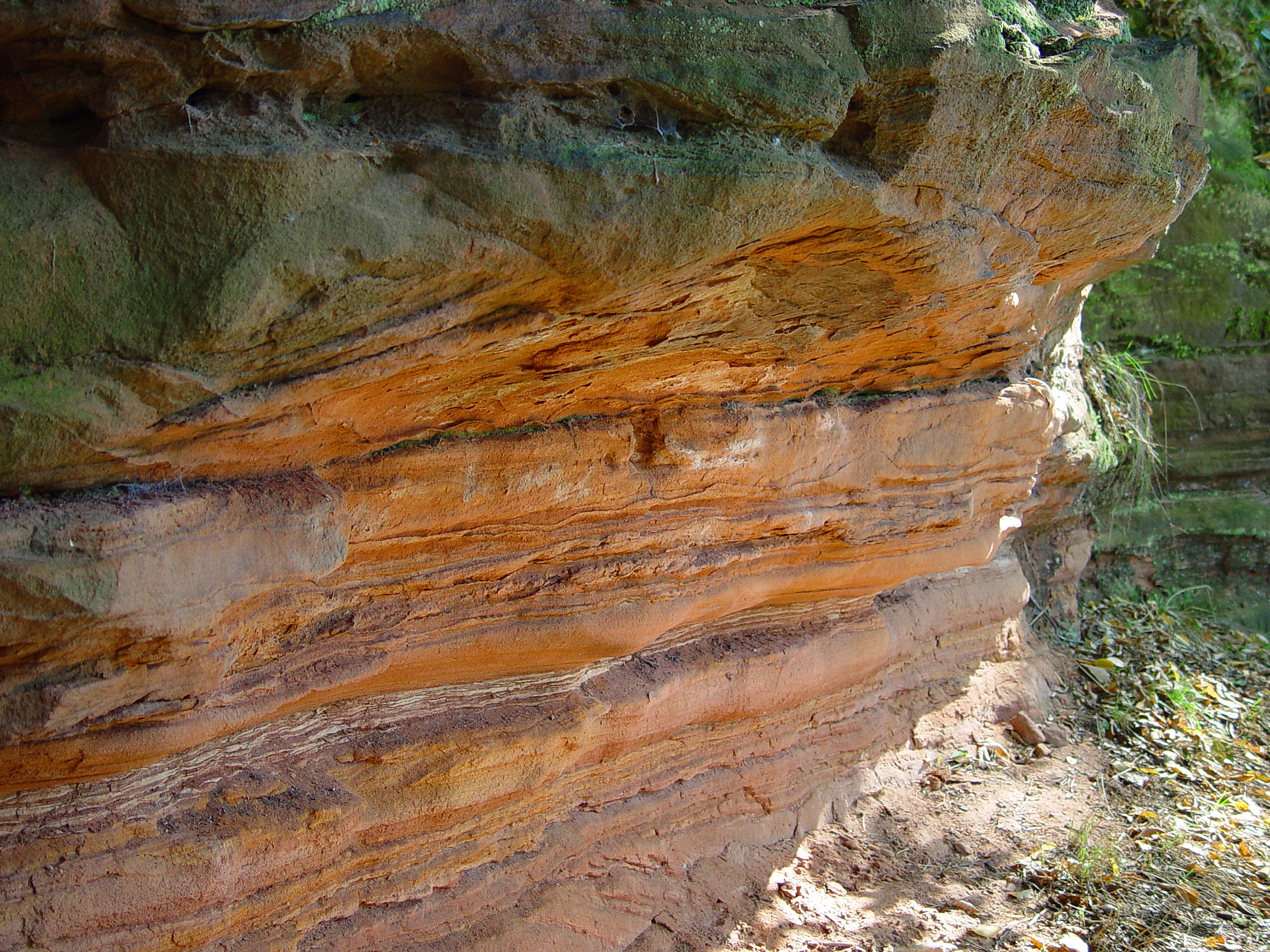
Sandstone layers of Triassic age in Thuringia

The geology of Germany is heavily influenced by several phases of orogeny in the Paleozoic and the Cenozoic, by sedimentation in shelf seas and epicontinental seas and on plains in the Permian and Mesozoic as well as by the Quaternary glaciations.

== Regional geological setting ==
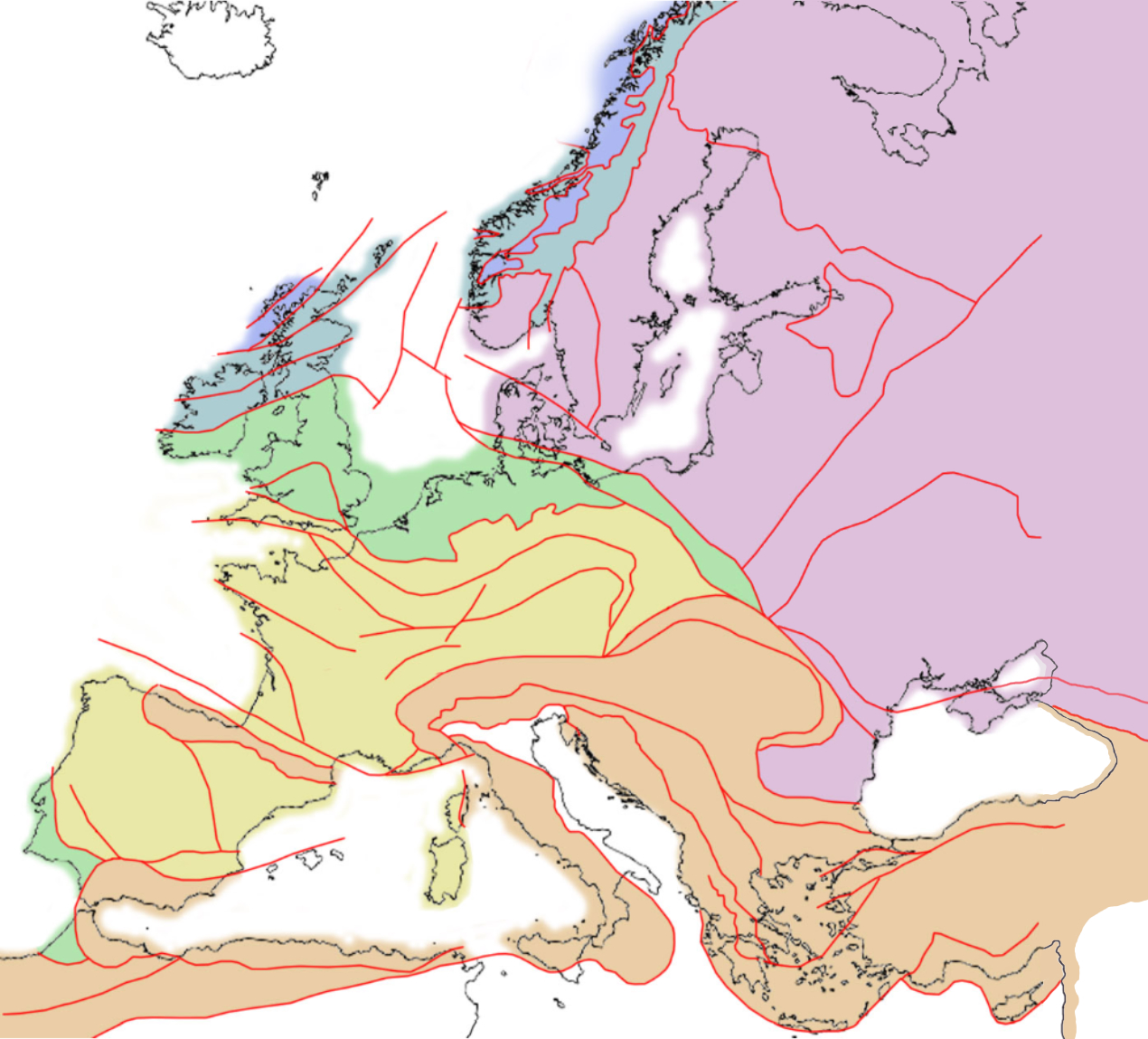
Map of tectonic provinces in Europe showing the Baltic Shield and East European Platform ( ) and European orogenic belts (Caledonian ; Variscan ; Alpine ). Red lines represent geological sutures. Germany is located at the centre of the map.

Germany is located between the geologically very old (Precambrian) East European Craton (Baltica) to the north and north-east (that further north is exposed as the Baltic Shield), and the geologically young (Cenozoic) Alpine-Carpathian Orogen to the south. The corresponding crustal provinces of Germany are thus geologically "middle-aged" and were accreted onto the East European Craton during the Paleozoic through plate tectonic processes. These areas form the geological basement of Germany. The basement is the oldest of the four geological crustal levels (German: Stockwerke) that overlap in Central Europe, north of the Alps. The levels mainly reflect the age relationships of rocks and the great tectonic trends that the Earth's crust was subjected to in the course of its geological history: crustal extension and widespread, mostly marine, sedimentation alternating with crustal compression/orogeny and extensive erosion. The surface geology of Germany has evolved to its current configuration due to regional differences in the action and appearance of external and internal forces during the last c. 20 million years. Germany can be divided into three physiographic regions: the Central European Depression, the Central European Blocks and the Alps.

== Physiographic regions ==
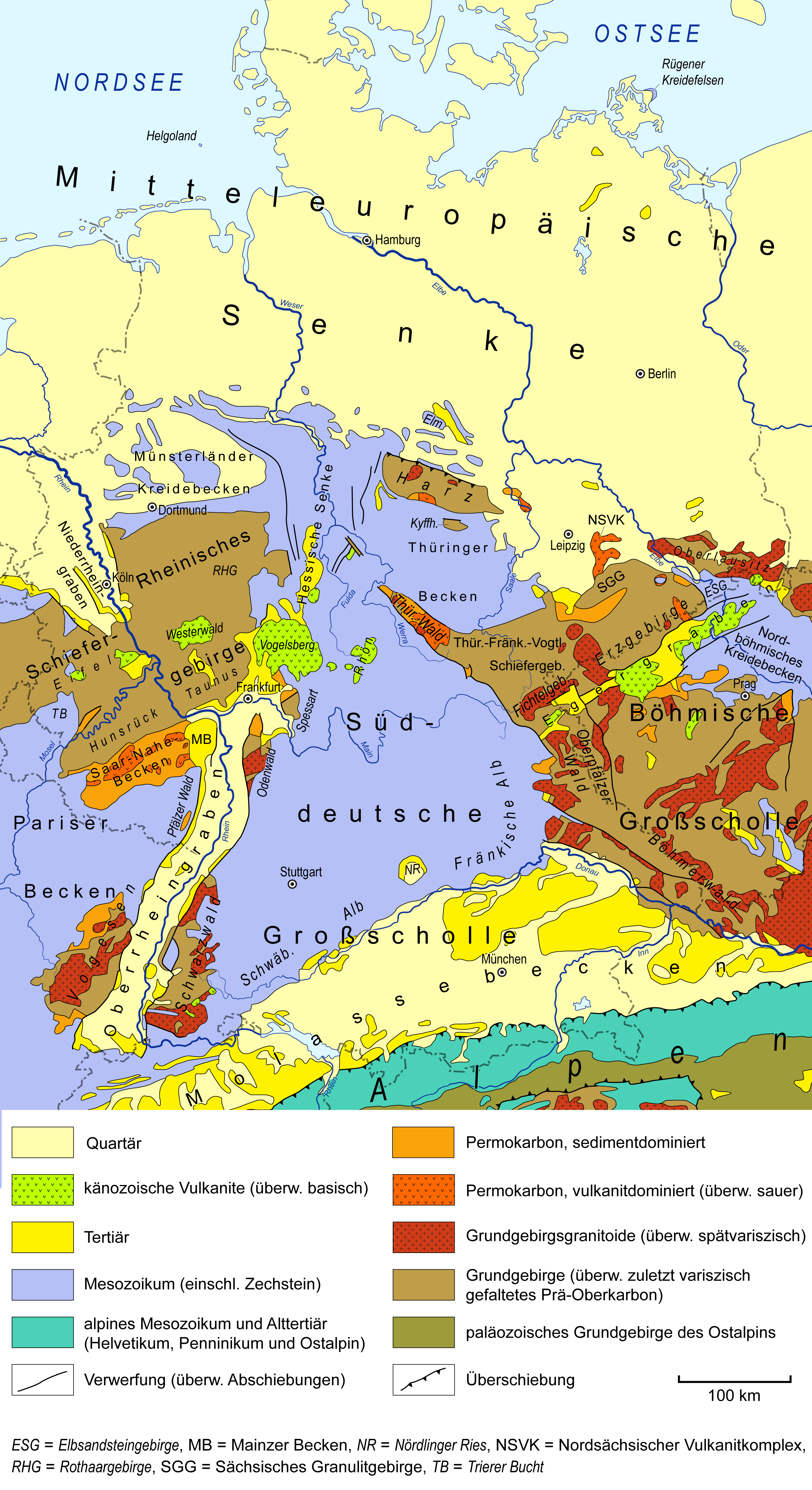
Simplified map of the surface geology of Germany. The Central European Depression (Mitteleuropäische Senke) (light yellow) is almost completely covered by Quaternary deposits (Quartär). The Central European Blocks area appears mainly in violet (Mesozoic + Zechstein + Ruhr Carboniferous (Silesian)) and brown (before late Carboniferous). In the far south are the Alps.

=== Central European Depression ===
The northern third of Germany is part of the Central European Depression (German: Mitteleuropäische Senke), also known as the North German-Polish Basin, corresponding roughly to the North German Plain. The Central European Depression is a long-term subsiding area containing a sedimentary rock sequence, several thousand metres thick, of Late Palaeozoic to Cenozoic age and is characterised by a strong surficial glacial overprint as well as salt tectonics of Permian underground salt diapirs together with minor long-range effects of the Alpine Orogeny.

=== Central European Blocks ===
South of the Central European Depression is the Central European Blocks area (German: Mitteleuropäisches Schollengebiet), which geographically includes the Central Uplands, the South German Scarplands, the Upper Rhine Plain and foothills of the Alps. The long-range effects of the Alpine Orogeny were relatively strong in this area and the effects of the Pleistocene glaciations were small. The region is divided into several structurally uplifted blocks, where extensively folded Paleozoic basement outcrops, and some subsided/non-uplifted blocks capped almost exclusively by Mesozoic or Cenozoic rocks. The uplifted blocks are the Rhenish Massif (excluding the Ardennes), the Saxon and Thuringian blocks (not to be confused with the Saxothuringian Zone) including the Harz, the Thuringian Basin, the Thuringian Forest, the Thuringian-Franconian-Vogtland Slate Mountains and the Fichtel Mountains-Ore Mountains. The latter three geological units form the north-western edge of the Bohemian Massif, which is the largest contiguous outcrop of basement in Central Europe. The north-east edge of the Bohemian Massif is the Sudeten Block. The western edge of the central part of the Bohemian Massif, the Bohemian Block, extends into Germany with the mountain ranges of the Upper Palatinate Forest and the Bavarian Forest. The subsided/non-uplifted blocks are the Lower Rhine Graben (or "Ruhr Graben") with the Cologne Lowland, the Münsterland Cretaceous Basin (Westphalian Lowland), the Solling Block (Hessian Depression), the South German Block (the South German Scarplands together with the Odenwald, the Spessart, the Black Forest and the Molasse Basin) and the Upper Rhine Graben.

=== Alpine-Carpathian Arc ===
South of the South German Block and the Bohemian Massif is the Alpine-Carpathian Arc (German: Alpen-Karpaten-Bogen). Although its extent in Germany is limited to the extreme south of Bavaria, this narrow strip has relatively high geological diversity. In this region, three of the four major tectonic "domains" of the Alps are found: the Helvetic nappes, the Penninic nappes (as the Rhenodanubian Flysch Zone) and the Eastern Alps (as the Northern Limestone Alps).

== Geological levels ==
North of the Alps, four crustal "levels" of surface and underground rocks in Germany are traditionally distinguished by age and structural characteristics (from deep to shallow): the basement, the transition level, the Mesozoic platform and the Cenozoic platform. The latter three are also summarised under the generic term "platform", in contrast to the basement.

=== Basement ===
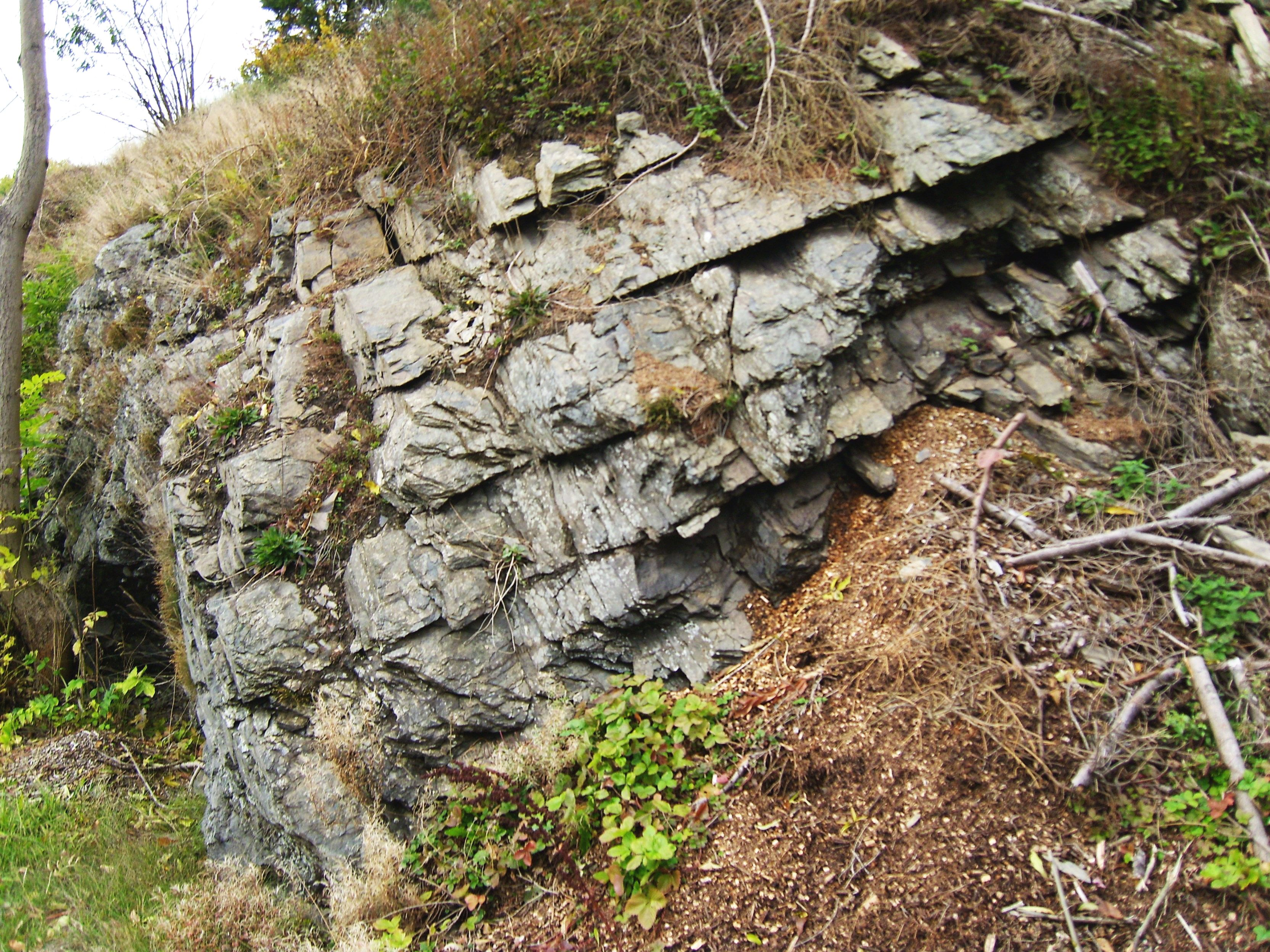
Road cut with Devonian slates near Züschen in the Rothaar Mountains (Rhenish Massif)

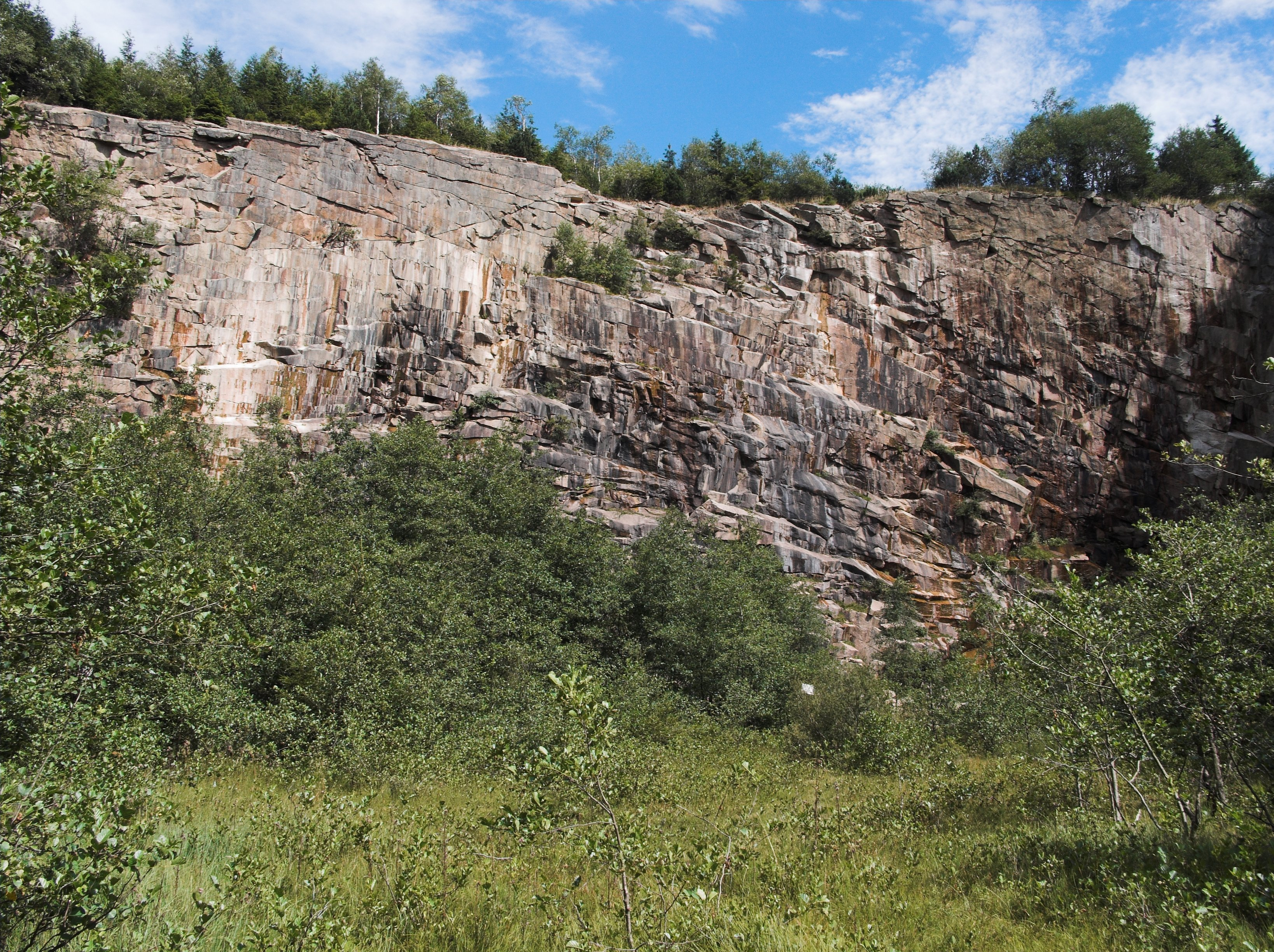
Quarry in the Brocken granite pluton on Wurmberg in the Upper Harz Mountains, parts of which are of early Permian (Asselian) age, one of the youngest rock bodies of the Variscan basement

The basement (German: Grundgebirgsstockwerk) consists of folded rocks, some of which are metamorphic rocks, mostly of marine-sedimentary and submarine-volcanic origin, intruded by granitoid plutons. Most of these rocks are of late Carboniferous age or older. Folding and metamorphism of these sedimentary and volcanic rocks, and the emplacement of the granitoids, occurred mainly in two Paleozoic orogenies: the Caledonian Orogeny in the Late Ordovician and the Variscan Orogeny in the early Carboniferous. In the oldest folded Variscan rocks, evidence exists of an older orogeny, the Cadomian Orogeny, which occurred before the accretion of the crustal blocks of Proto-Europe (Baltica) (German: Ur-Europa). The folded basement rocks originated in the Proterozoic, but even older relics of continental crust are found in a paragneiss of the Bavarian Forest, the protolith of which was probably deposited after the Cadomian Orogeny. A sample of this paragneiss contains a detrital zircon grain, whose core crystallised from a magma about 3.84 billion years ago during the Archaean eon.

Whereas the Caledonian folded basement lies a few thousand metres below the surface of the Central European Depression, the Variscan basement or Variscides (German: Varistikum) outcrops in the Central European Blocks area, occurring extensively in several large highland areas and also sparsely in some lowland areas in the form of basement uplifts. A distinction is made here between rock complexes, commonly referred to as "slate belts" (German: Schiefergebirge) made of unmetamorphosed or weakly metamorphosed rocks (slate, chert, sandstone, limestone, altered basalt, phyllite and quartzite) which are intruded only to a small extent by granitoids, and rock complexes commonly referred to as crystalline, comprising weakly to highly metamorphosed rocks (phyllite, quartzite, marble, amphibolite, serpentinite, schist, gneiss, granulite and eclogite) which are extensively intruded by granitoids. The slate belt rock units were folded at a shallow depth at relatively low temperatures, whereas the metamorphic crystalline areas sank much deeper during the Variscan Orogeny, and were subjected to high pressures and, in some places, very high temperatures which caused partial melting of the rocks. The geochemical signature of the Variscan granitoids suggests that their magma was produced by the partial melting of deeply-buried sedimentary rocks. Outcropping slate belts are found mainly in the Rhenish Massif, the Harz and the Thuringian-Franconian-Vogtland Slate Mountains. Outcropping crystalline areas are found mainly in the Black Forest, the western Odenwald, Vorspessart, as well as the German periphery of the Bohemian Massif (Upper Lusatia, the Ore Mountains, the Fichtel Mountains, the Palatinate Forest and the Bavarian Forest).

=== Transition ===
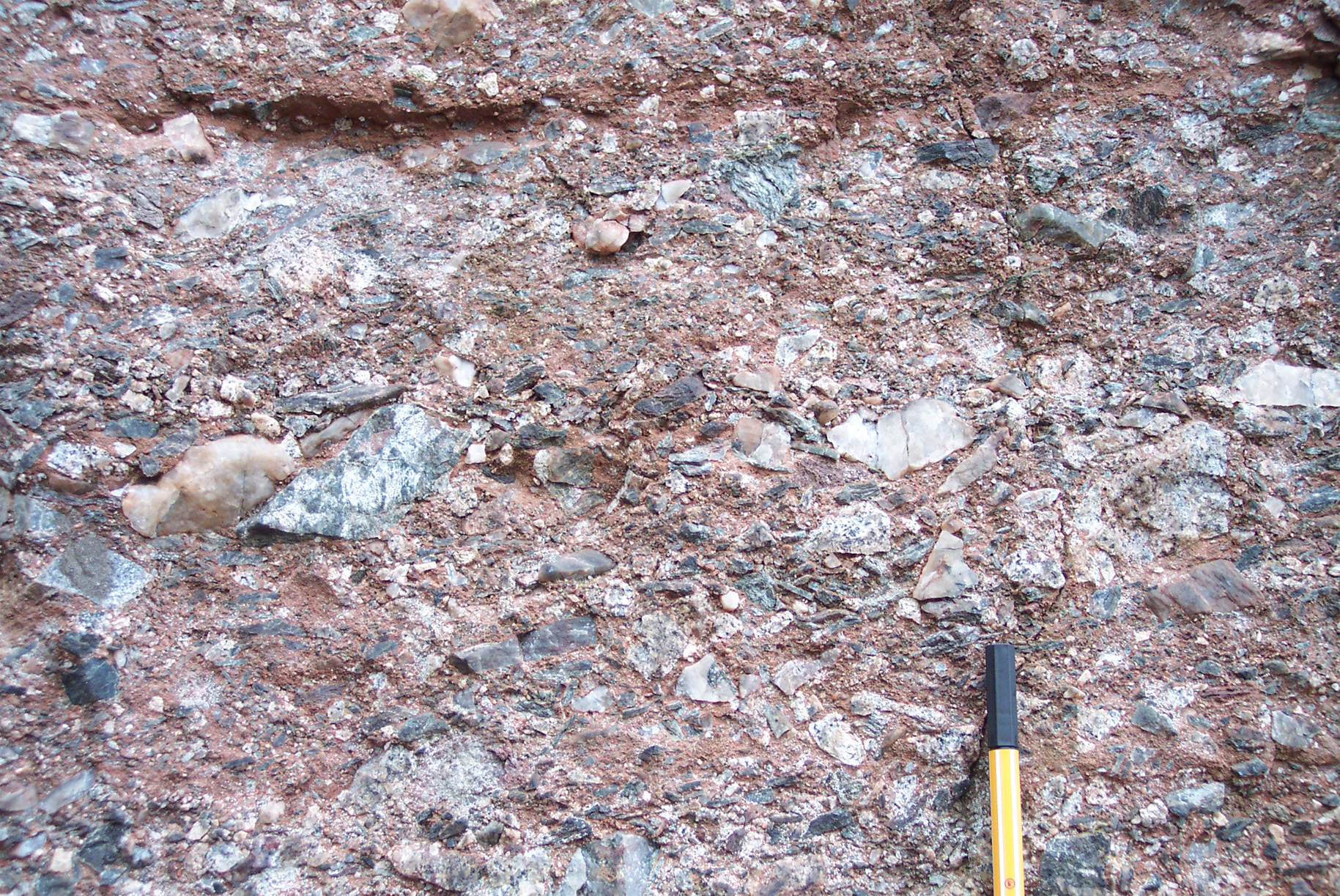
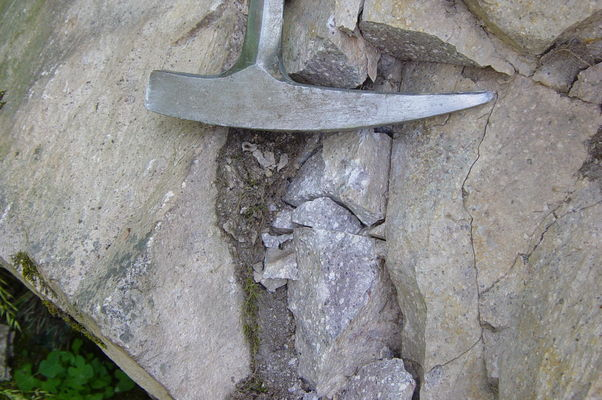
Left: Typical Permian conglomerate, below Wartburg castle (Thuringian Forest). Right: Permian rhyolite of the Saar-Nahe Basin, near Wöllstein.

The transition level (German: Übergangsstockwerk) includes all unfolded sedimentary and volcanic rocks of late Carboniferous (Stephanian) to mid-Permian (Guadalupian) age. "Transition level" refers, in part, to the stratigraphic position of these rocks: they are younger than the folded Variscides but older than the layers of the Mesozoic platform. In addition, they stem from a geological transition phase, which is characterised by the flattening of the Variscan mountains and by post-Variscan volcanism, which was accompanied by crustal extension in the Variscan Orogen. The rocks of the transition level differ from the younger platform sediments in that they are often relatively coarse-grained (conglomeratic) Molasse sedimentary rocks and acidic to intermediate volcanic rocks (especially rhyolite), whereas the Mesozoic platform has few conglomerates and no volcanic rocks. The transition level is divided lithostratigraphically into Stephanian and Permian (Rotliegend) sequences. Rocks of the transition level are found today mainly in the Saar-Nahe Basin, the Halle-Leipzig area (e.g. Halle Porphyry Complex), the Ore Mountain Basin and the Thuringian Forest.

=== Mesozoic platform ===
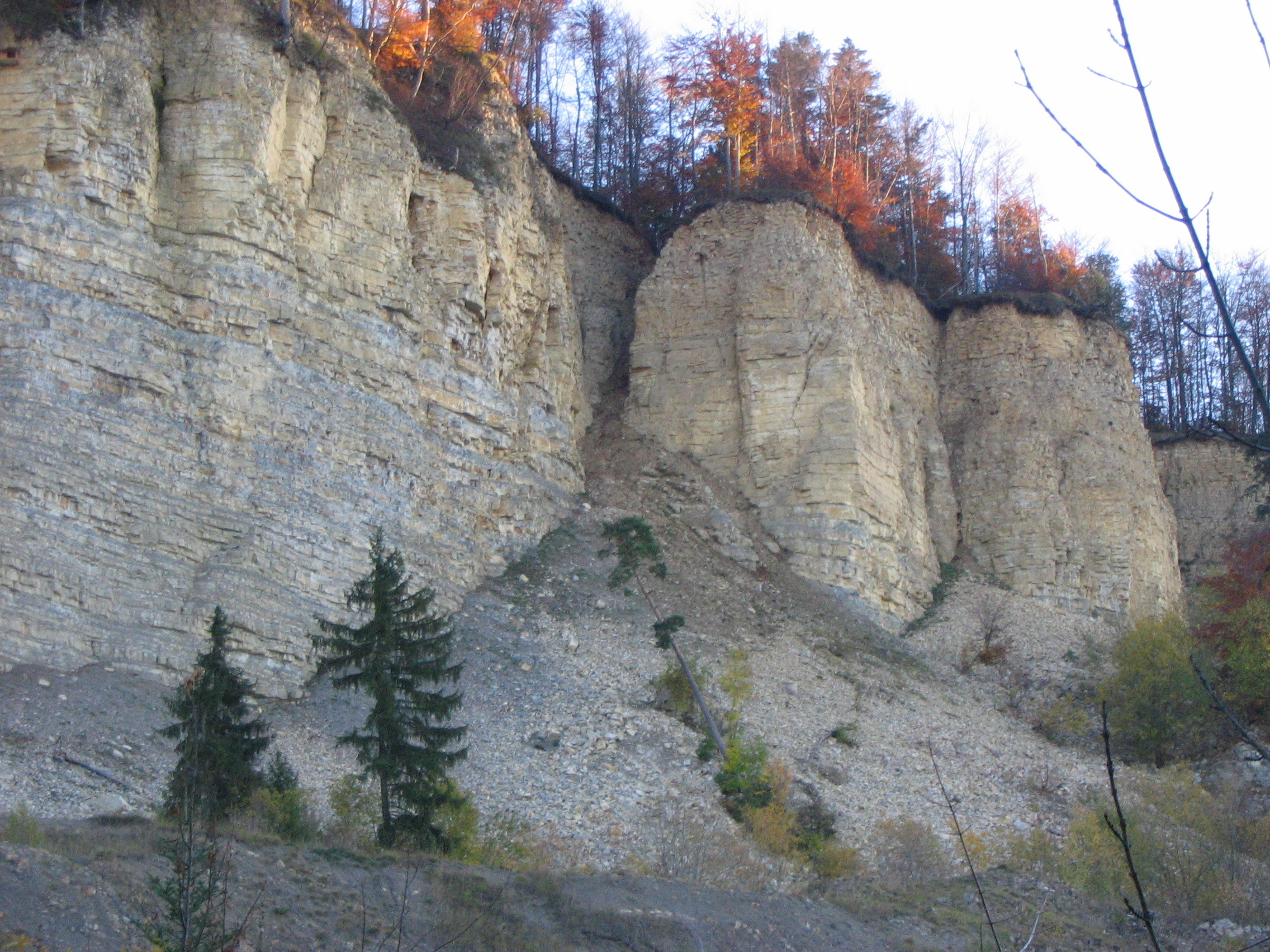
Outcropping beds of White Jurassic limestone at the edge of the landslide at Hirschkopf near Mössingen (Swabian Jura)

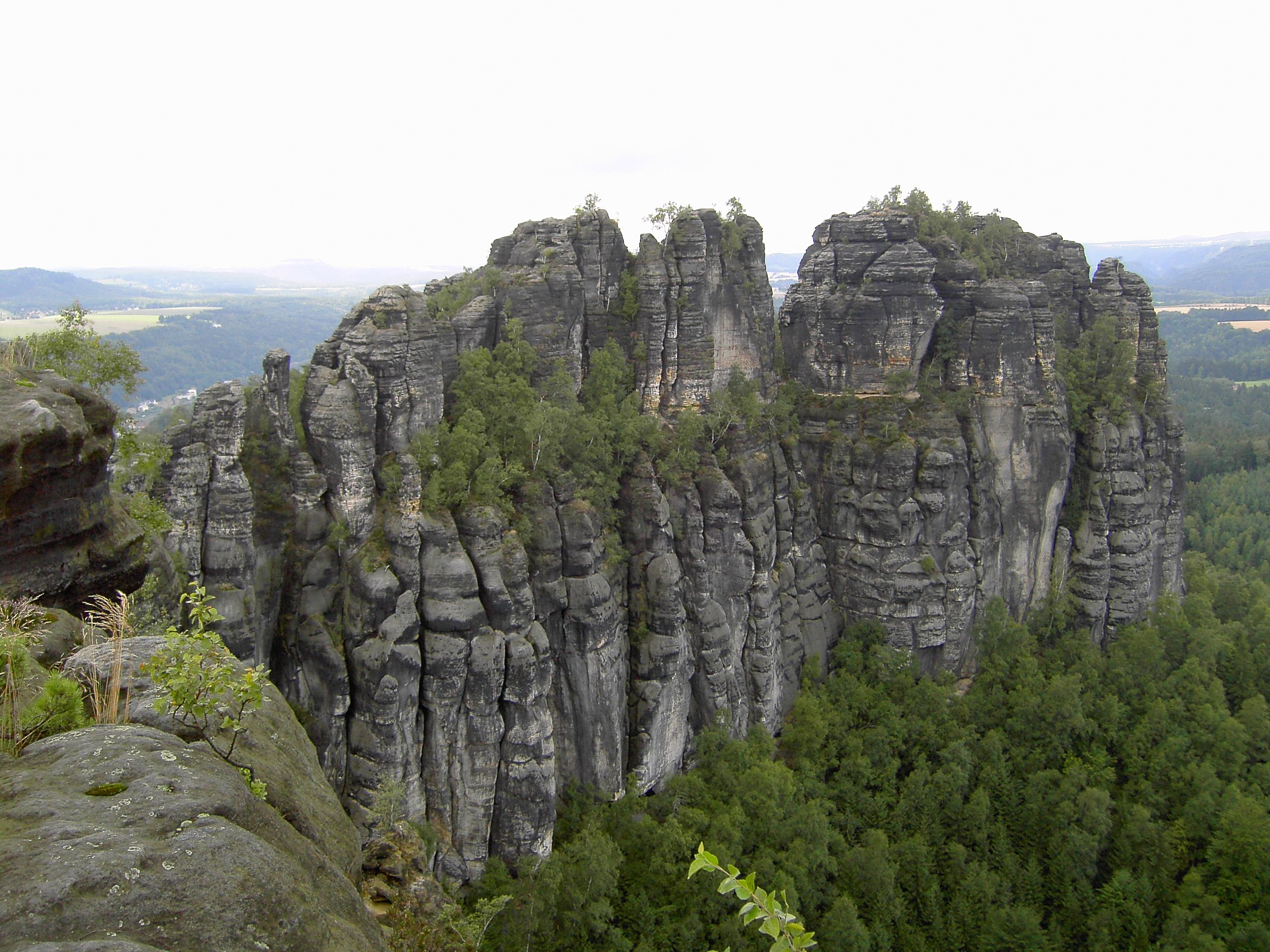
The Schrammsteine, Upper Cretaceous sandstones in the Elbe Sandstone Mountains near Bad Schandau

The Mesozoic platform (German: Mesozoisches Deckgebirge) includes all virtually unfolded sedimentary rocks of the Mesozoic (Triassic, Jurassic and Cretaceous), but also includes some Paleozoic deposits of the Lopingian epoch of the late Permian. In northern Germany, in principle, even the relatively unfolded or weakly folded post-Caledonian/pre-Permian sediments (including the Ruhr Carboniferous and its western continuation in the Aachen area) are included with the Mesozoic platform.

The outcropping Mesozoic platform at the surface comprises Zechstein (Middle/Upper Permian) marine gypsum rocks and limestones, Buntsandstein (Lower Triassic) siliciclastic rocks, Muschelkalk (Middle Triassic) marine limestones, Keuper (Middle and Upper Triassic) mixed evaporite-carbonate-siliciclastic deposits, Lower Jurassic (Lias/Schwarzjura) marine black shales, Dogger/Braunjura (Middle Jurassic) marine, often iron-bearing, siliciclastic rocks, White Jurassic/Malm (Upper Jurassic) marine limestones, Lower Cretaceous (Wealden) continental siliciclastic rocks and Upper Cretaceous marine limestones, sandstones and gaizes. (Note: Gaize (German: Pläner) is a historical or traditional summary term for some marine sedimentary rocks of the Upper Cretaceous, especially the Cenomanian and Turonian of Central Europe and the Baltic States. In modern geological classifications, the word can only be found as part of the name of some lithostratigraphic units, not as a sedimentary petrographic term. Gaize has a relatively well-bedded structure with layer thicknesses of a few millimetres to a maximum of about 1.5 metres. This distinctive stratification has influenced mining of split slabs, blocks or broken material for lime burning. The main mineral constituents of gaize are quartz, calcite, clay minerals and mica (mainly glauconite). Due to the different proportions of the minerals depending on the occurrence, practically the entire range between limestone, quartz sandstone and claystone is covered. The colour of gaizes varies between grey beige and gold beige. In addition, gaize often has a characteristic spotted appearance.) Outcropping Zechstein rocks are limited to the edges of basement uplifts. Triassic rocks cover the largest area. In the South German Block, extensively outcropping Mesozoic rocks dip towards the south-east. Due to the alternating layering of weathering/erosion-prone shales and more resistant sandstones and limestones, a cuesta landscape has formed there in the past several million years. The most conspicuous of these cuestas is the White Jura of Franconia and the Swabian Jura. Uplands formed by relatively weathering/erosion-resistant sandstones of the early/middle Buntsandstein are the Palatinate Forest, the Odenwald, the Spessart, the Südrhön and the Burgwald. Ridges of Muschelkalk limestone are found mainly in the Thuringian Basin. Probably the most well-known occurrence of Cretaceous sandstones is the Elbe Sandstone Mountains.

In northern Germany, individual blocks have been forced up by salt domes, and have been eroded down to the older layers of the Mesozoic platform. Erosion-resistant bedrock on these blocks forms small isolated ridges, especially in the northern Harz foreland region. These include the Elm hills (Muschelkalk), the Asse hills (Buntsandstein and Muschelkalk) and the Grosser Fallstein (Muschelkalk) as well as the island of Heligoland (Buntsandstein). Cretaceous chalk can be found, partly covered by thin Quaternary deposits, only in northern Germany, including in Münsterland Cretaceous Basin, where the Cretaceous deposits directly rest on the Ruhr Carboniferous and continue westward into the Aachen Formation, as well as in the Hanover and Salzgitter area. Probably the most well-known Cretaceous limestones of Germany are those on the island of Rügen, on Germany's north coast.

=== Cenozoic platform ===
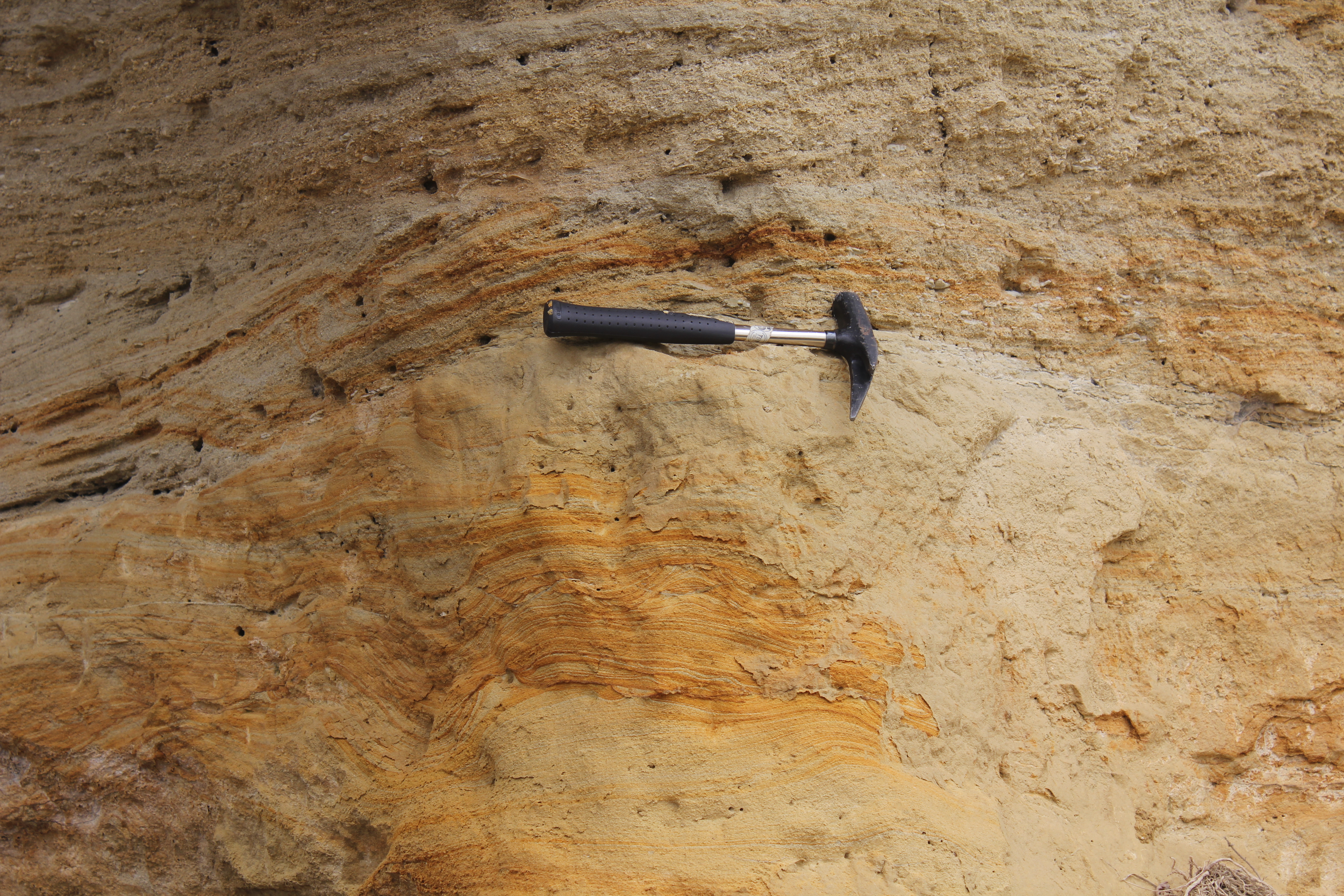
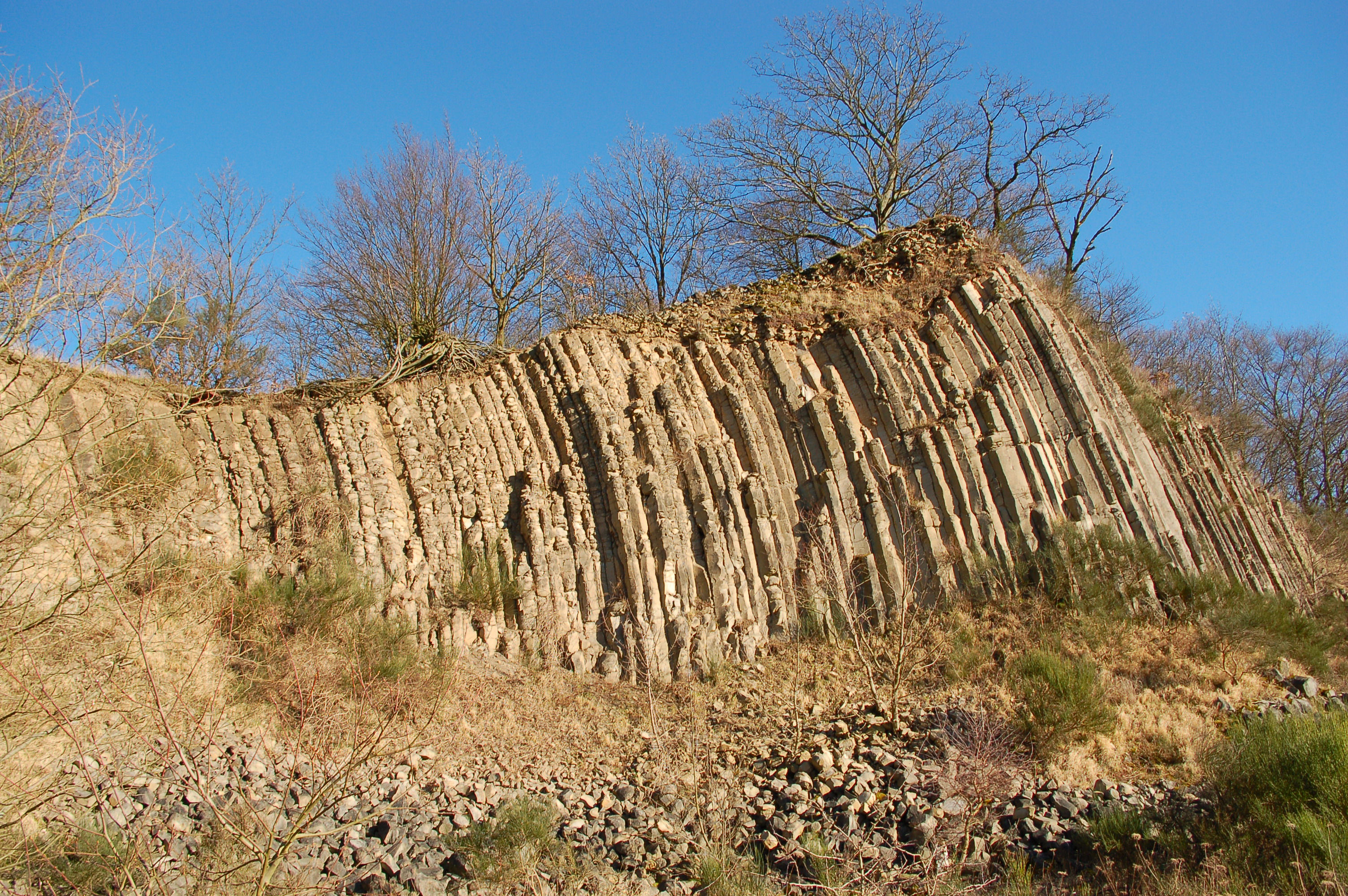
Left: Miocene marine sands of the Molasse Basin, Rammingen Sand Pit near Öllingen. Right: Outcrop of Tertiary columnar-jointed basalt at Hummelsberg, Westerwald.

The Cenozoic platform (German: Känozoisches Deckgebirge) comprises Tertiary and Quaternary rocks. It is also known as the "unconsolidated rock" level (German: Lockergesteinsstockwerk) because, due to their young age, the Cenozoic sedimentary rocks have often not experienced intensive diagenesis and are therefore often not cemented. Because the youngest deposits in an uplifted area are removed first, the Cenozoic platform deposits occur extensively only in young Cenozoic subsidence areas in the Central European Blocks region where the largest outcrops are the Upper Rhine Graben, the Mainz Basin and the Molasse Basin (Alpine foreland trough). Special "subsidence areas" are the Nördlinger Ries and the Steinheim crater, both originating through a meteorite impact event. The Cenozoic deposits in the Central European Blocks region consist of both siliciclastic rocks and limestones and both marine and continental sediments. The Cenozoic in Germany is also represented by volcanic rocks. In contrast to the mostly acidic (SiO_{2}-rich) volcanic rocks of the transition level, the Cenozoic formations are mostly intermediate to very SiO_{2}-poor (trachyte, basalt, phonolite, tephrite, nephelinite and basanite). The largest Cenozoic volcanic areas in Germany are the Vogelsberg Mountains, the Westerwald, the Rhön Mountains and the Eifel.

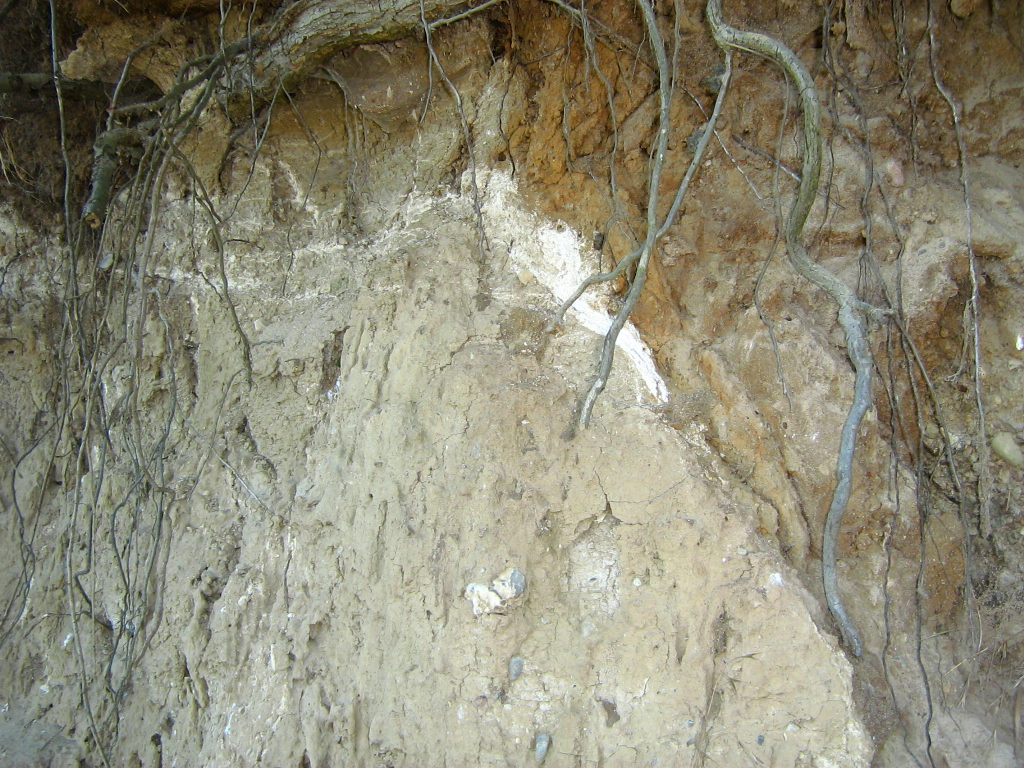
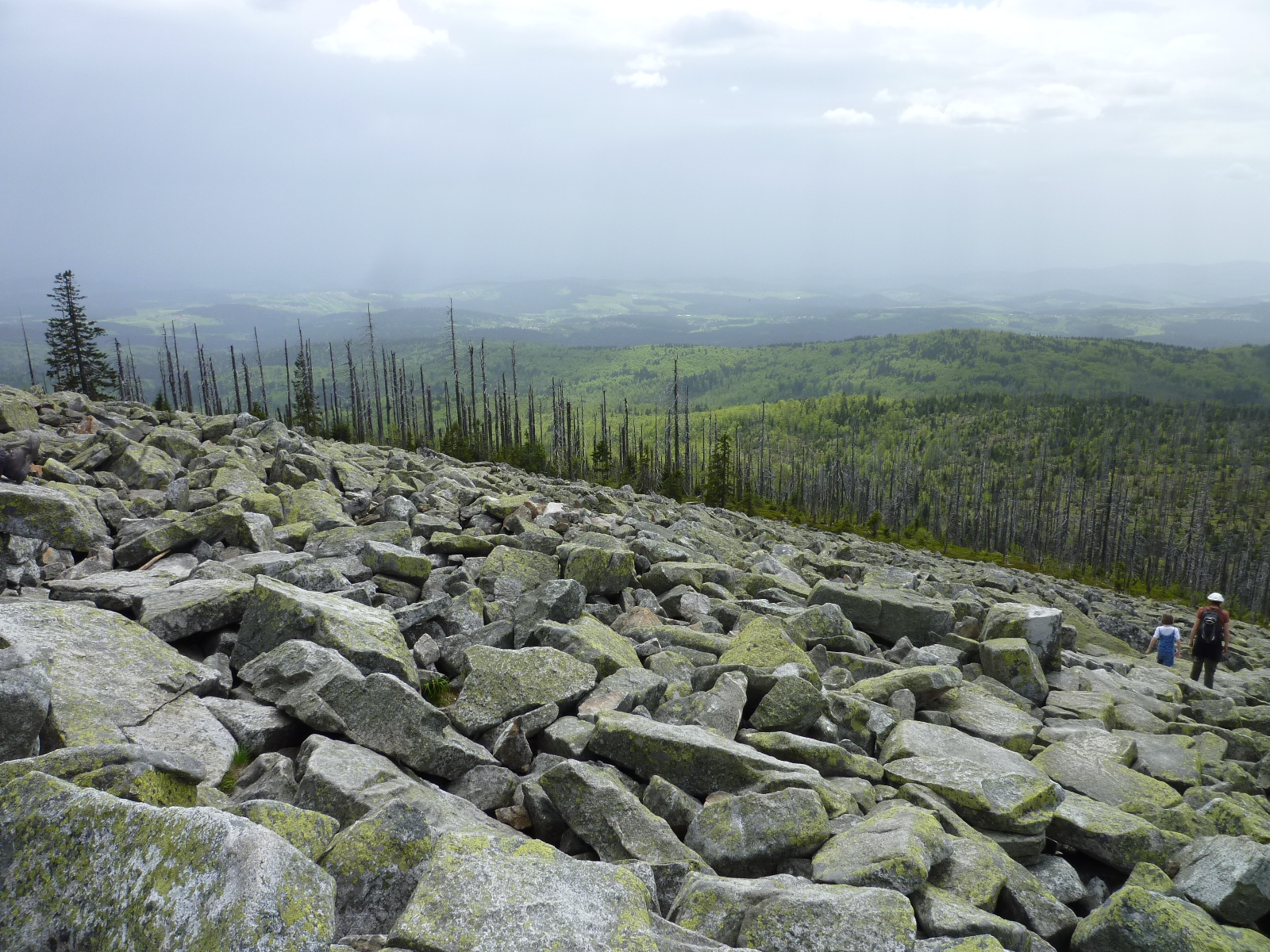
Left: Quaternary sand-gravel esker sediments affected by recent pedogenesis (leaching and reprecipitation of carbonates near the ground surface) in Gatschow, eastern Mecklenburg-Vorpommern. Right: Quaternary periglacially-originated stone run on Lusen in the Bavarian Forest.

In northern Germany, almost the entire surface geology is made of Cenozoic sediments (mostly Pleistocene and Holocene glacial or fluvioglacial deposits). Moraines and urstromtals determine the relief. Thus the Southern Ridge (German: Südliche Landrücken) is a moraine of the Saale glaciation and the Northern Ridge (German: Nördliche Landrücken) is a moraine of the Weichselian glaciation. The material of these sediments was picked up by the ice sheet on its way from Scandinavia to Central Europe and was deposited during the melting there. The route that the ice took can be reconstructed with the aid of rocks, the cobbles in the moraine sediments, because these can be matched with certain regions in Scandinavia. In southern Germany, with the exception of the Alpine foreland and the Upper Rhine Graben, there are rather thin Quaternary deposits and formations, geographically confined mostly to lower slopes and valleys where they occur as scree and stone runs or as fluvial gravels and sands. In the foothills of the Alps, there are also Pleistocene moraines. There, however, the cobbles originate from the Alps and a different nomenclature than in Northern Germany is used for the glacial periods in which the ice from the mountains in the south pushed into the foothills: The Saale glaciation corresponds there to the Riss glaciation; the Weichselian glaciation corresponds to the Würm glaciation.

== German Alps ==
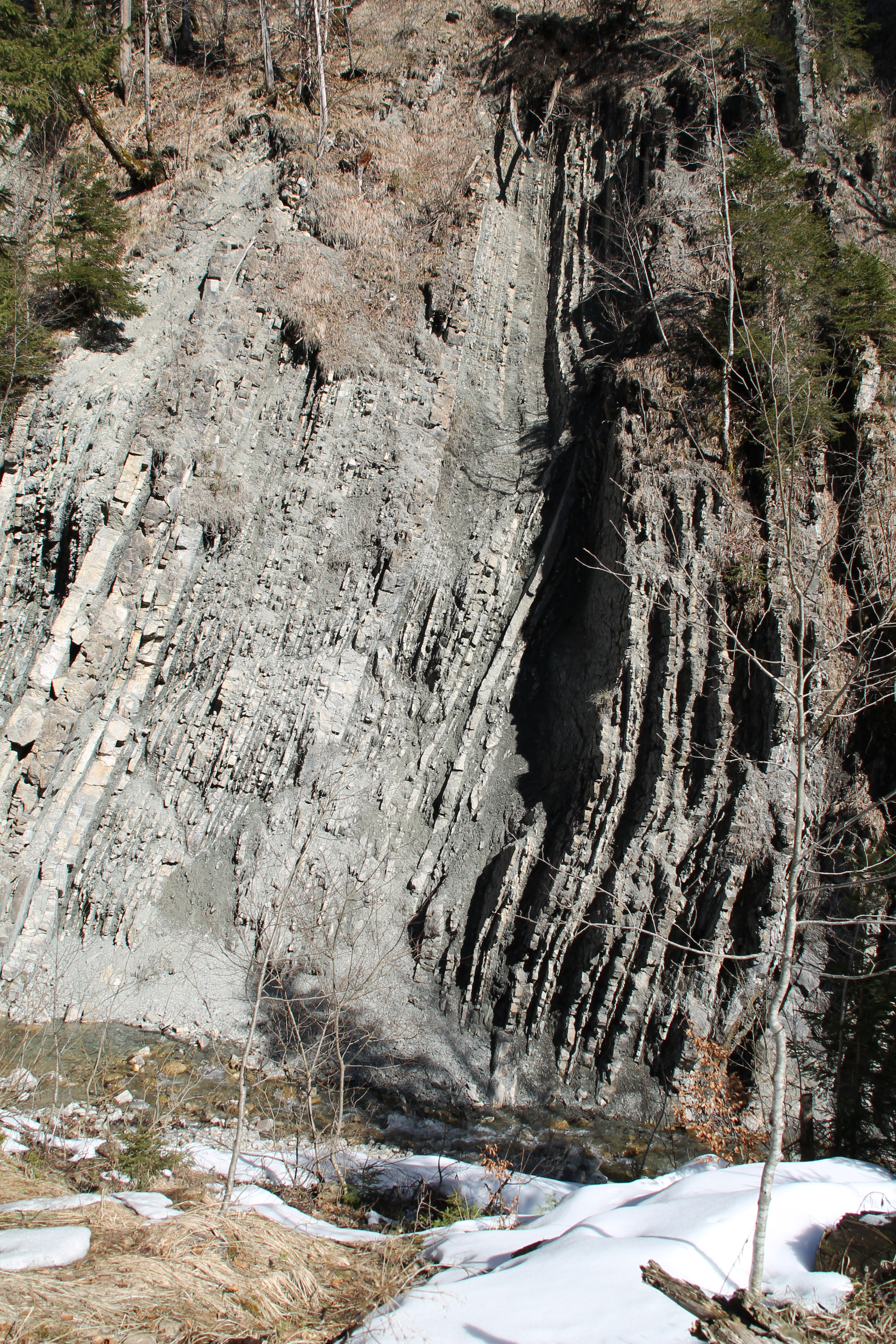
Rhenodanubian flysch: Steeply-titled rhythmic limestone-marl-mudrock interbedding of the Piesenkopf Formation (Upper Cretaceous) in Röthenbachtal, Ostallgäu

The Alps are a young orogen, in which the relatively simple geological relationship between basement and platform that exists in the area north of the Alps has been overprinted and complicated by orogenic processes. The formation of the Alps happened in tectonic "domains", but within which basement and platform can be distinguished, which either jointly or separately, are built of separate nappes. The nappes outcropping in the German Alps invariably contain platform units of folded, unmetamorphosed sedimentary rocks, mainly of Mesozoic age, which were deposited almost exclusively in a marine environment. They are associated with three of the four domains of the Alps.

=== Helvetic domain ===
The Helvetic Domain (also known as the Helvetic Nappes) (German: Helvetikum) strikes approximately east-west in a strip, mostly only a few hundred metres wide, right at the northern edge of the Alps with siliciclastic and carbonate rocks of the Cretaceous and the early Tertiary that are overthrust towards the north onto the southern edge of the Molasse Basin. There are mainly shallow marine formations that are, for example, rich in nummulites (the Kressenberg Formation). They represent the inner continental shelf on the southern edge of pre-Alpine Europe and they were not affected by the folding and overthrusting processes of the Alpine Orogeny until relatively late.

=== Flysch zone ===
The Penninic Domain (also known as the Penninic Nappes) (German: Penninikum) strikes south of the Helvetic Domain in a strip, a few kilometres wide, in the form of the Rhenodanubian Flysch Zone. It comprises Cretaceous – lower Tertiary siliciclastic-carbonate turbiditic deepwater sediments, which represent a portion of the erosion debris forming the Alpine sedimentary wedge that in the further course of formation of the Alps was itself incorporated into the orogen and overthrust over a distance of about 100 km to the north onto the Helvetic units.

=== Limestone Alps ===
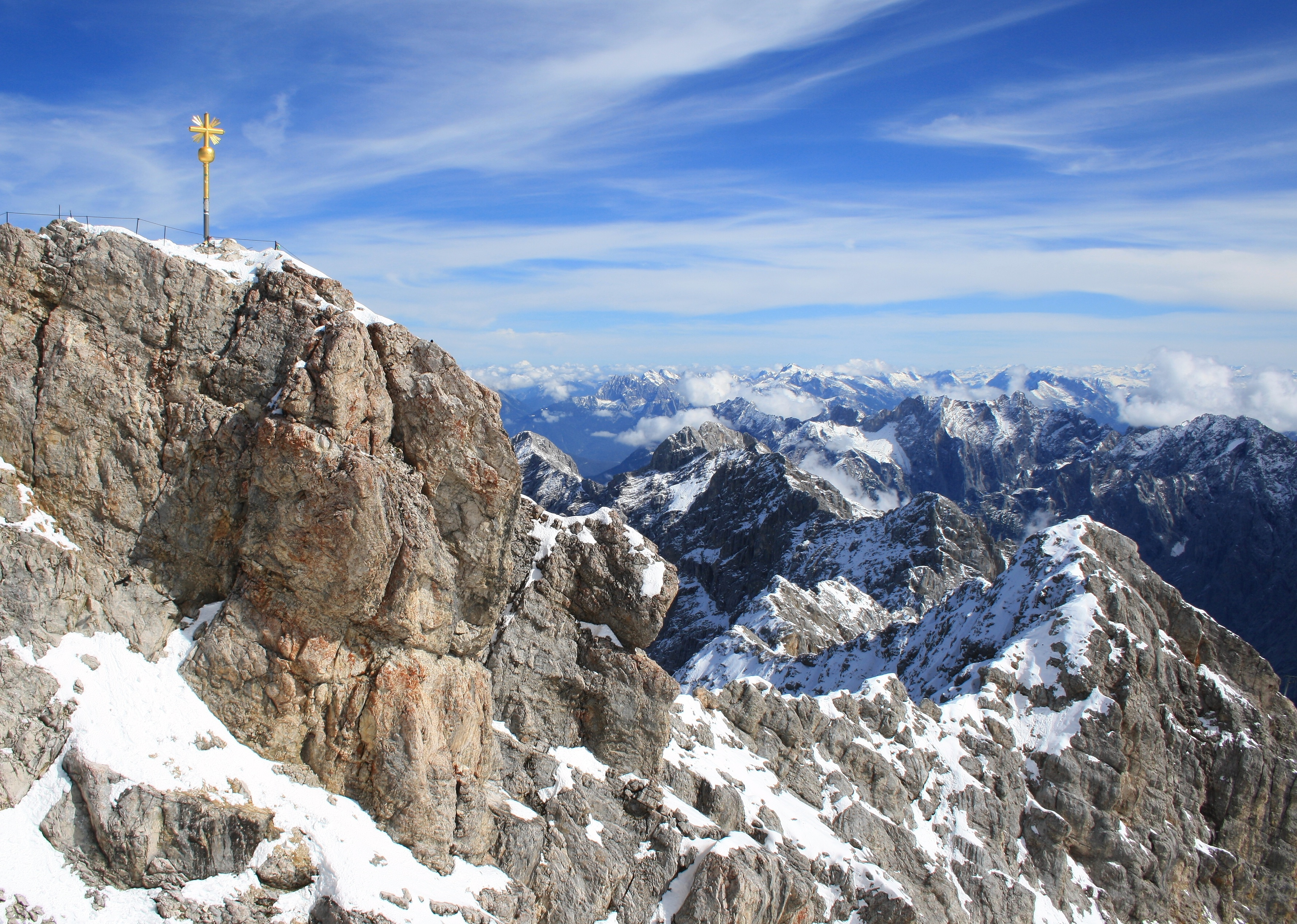
German Limestone Alps: Thickly bedded carbonates of the Wetterstein limestone (Middle Triassic) in the summit area of Zugspitze

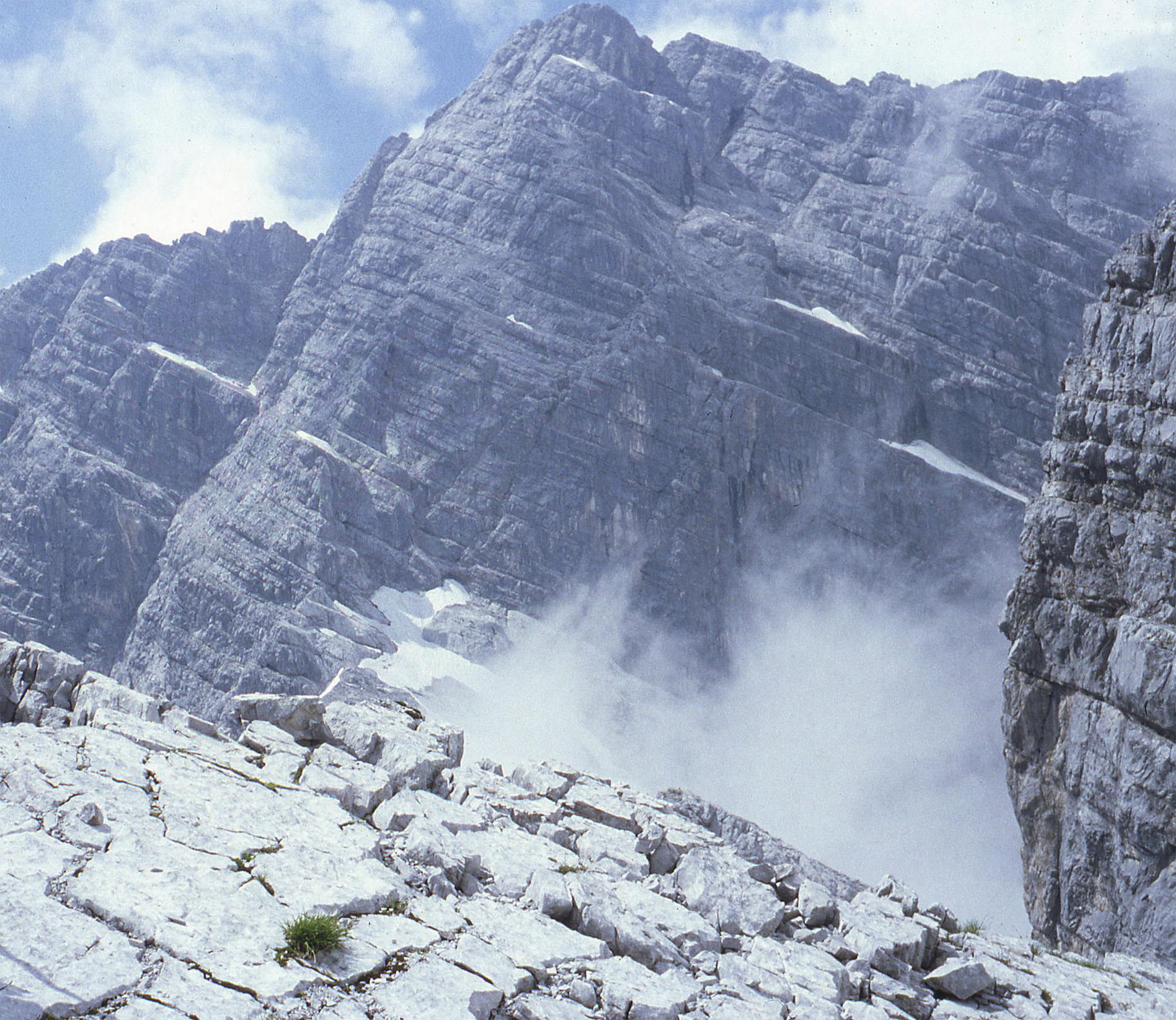
German Limestone Alps: Thickly bedded limestones of the Dachstein Formation (Upper Triassic) in the east wall of Watzmann

The Eastern Alps strike south of the Flysch Zone and occupy the largest area in the German Alps. In Germany, the Eastern Alps are, for the most part, Mesozoic mostly Triassic carbonate rocks. This carbonate rock association, whose outcrop (including the Austrian parts) runs in a 35 to 50-kilometre-wide strip from Vorarlberg as far as the Vienna Basin, is called the Northern Limestone Alps. In contrast to the Helvetic Domain and the Flysch Zone that still mostly have a low mountain character (German: Mittelgebirge) although they are morphologically clearly set apart from the Alpine foreland, the Northern Limestone Alps form high mountains (German: Hochgebirge) of well over 2,000 metres above sea level. Of the high mountains of Germany, the highest is Zugspitze, with a height of 2,962 metres, more than a thousand metres higher than Feldberg in the Black Forest, Germany's highest mountain outside the Alps.

The Northern Limestone Alps represent a depositional environment that was probably located several hundred kilometres to the south, relative to the current position of the rocks. This is reflected in facies as well as in the fossil record: While in the Eastern Alps platform carbonates with tropical faunas were established during the late Middle Triassic, the contemporary, epicontinental, partly terrestrial sequences in Central Europe north of the Alps are rather dominated by siliciclastics and had rather warm temperate faunas. Therefore, especially with regard to the formation of Triassic rocks, a distinction is made between "Germanic facies" (Central Europe north of the Alps) and "Alpine facies" (Northern Limestone Alps). Starting from the Late Cretaceous, the Eastern Alps were affected by the Alpine Orogeny and the rocks of the Northern Limestone Alps were stacked and transported northwards to their present position, overriding the Helvetic and Penninic domains.

== See also ==
- European Cenozoic Rift System
- Geography of Germany
- Geology of the Alps
- Germanic Trias
- Laacher See
- List of earthquakes in Germany
- List of fossiliferous stratigraphic units in Germany
- List of sedimentary formations in Germany
- Messel pit
- Nördlinger Ries
- Rhine Gorge
- Solnhofen limestone
- Volcanic Eifel

== Bibliography ==
- Deutsche Stratigraphische Kommission (2002) Stratigraphische Tabelle von Deutschland 2002, Potsdam, ISBN 3-00-010197-7 (in German)
- Dierk Henningsen, Gerhard Katzung (2006) Einführung in die Geologie Deutschlands 7th edition, Munich, Spektrum Akademischer Verlag, ISBN 3-8274-1586-1 (in German)
- Roland Walter (1995) Geologie von Mitteleuropa. 6th edition, Stuttgart, E. Schweizerbart’sche Verlagsbuchhandlung, ISBN 978-351-0-65167-2 (in German)
