= Germanic Trias =

Sequence of rock strata

System	Series	Stage	Age (Ma)	European lithostratigraphy
Jurassic	Lower	Hettangian	younger	Lias
Triassic	Upper	Rhaetian	201.4–208.5	Lias
Triassic	Upper	Rhaetian	201.4–208.5	Keuper
Triassic	Upper	Norian	208.5–227.0	Keuper
Triassic	Upper	Carnian	227.0–237.0	Keuper
Triassic	Middle	Ladinian	237.0–242.0	Keuper
Triassic	Middle	Ladinian	237.0–242.0	Muschelkalk
Triassic	Middle	Anisian	242.0–247.2	Muschelkalk
Triassic	Middle	Anisian	242.0–247.2	Bunter or Buntsandstein
Triassic	Lower	Olenekian	247.2–251.2	Bunter or Buntsandstein
Triassic	Lower	Induan	251.2–251.9	Bunter or Buntsandstein
Permian	Lopingian	Changhsingian	older	Bunter or Buntsandstein
Permian	Lopingian	Changhsingian	older	Zechstein
Major lithostratigraphic units of northwest Europe with the ICS's geologic timescale of the Triassic.

The Germanic Trias Supergroup (German: Germanische Trias-Supergruppe) is a lithostratigraphic unit (a sequence of rock strata) in the subsurface of large parts of western and central Europe (north of the Alps) and the North Sea. Almost all of the Germanic Trias was deposited during the Triassic period and consists of three clearly different units: Buntsandstein, Muschelkalk and Keuper, that gave the period its name (Triassic means "threefold"). In the past the names of these three units were also used as units in the geologic timescale, but in modern literature they only have a lithostratigraphic meaning.

== Origin ==
The Germanic Trias formed in the large Germanic Basin, a basin that covered much of midwestern Europe (including the south of the North Sea and Baltic Sea) during the Triassic. The Muschelkalk has a predominantly marine facies whereas the Buntsandstein and Keuper are mostly continental.

== Stratigraphy ==
In the central parts of the Germanic Basin, the Germanic Trias has an average thickness of 800 meters, but regional differences are considerable. In the north of Germany the thickness of the Buntsandstein alone can exceed 1400 meters. The Germanic Trias lies on top of the Permian Zechstein Group and below Lower Jurassic units, such as the Lias Group or Altena Group.

The base is not defined in the same way everywhere. In northern Germany the base is formed by the Calvörde Beds, in the Spessart and Odenwald by the base of the Heigenbrücken-Sandstone. Radiometric dating has shown the age of the Germanic Trias is not totally corresponding with the Triassic period. The base of the Buntsandstein was formed during the Changhsingian, the uppermost stage of the Permian, about 252 million years ago. The top of the Keuper is Rhaetian in age and at about 200.5 million years ago at least a few million years older than the Triassic-Jurassic boundary. Usually there is a stratigraphic hiatus between the base of the Lias and top of the Germanic Trias.

In German lithostratigraphy, Buntsandstein, Muschelkalk and Keuper are seen as groups. Dutch lithostratigraphy divides the Germanic Trias along other boundaries in a Lower Germanic Trias Group and an Upper Germanic Trias Group. The Dutch Keuper and Muschelkalk have the status of formations while the Dutch Buntsandstein is subdivided in a number of formations. The Bunter of British stratigraphy is similar in age, lithology and facies to the Buntsandstein.

== See also ==
- Geology of Germany
