= Lange Anna =

Sea stack in Heligoland, Germany

Coordinates: 54°11′18″N 7°52′11″E

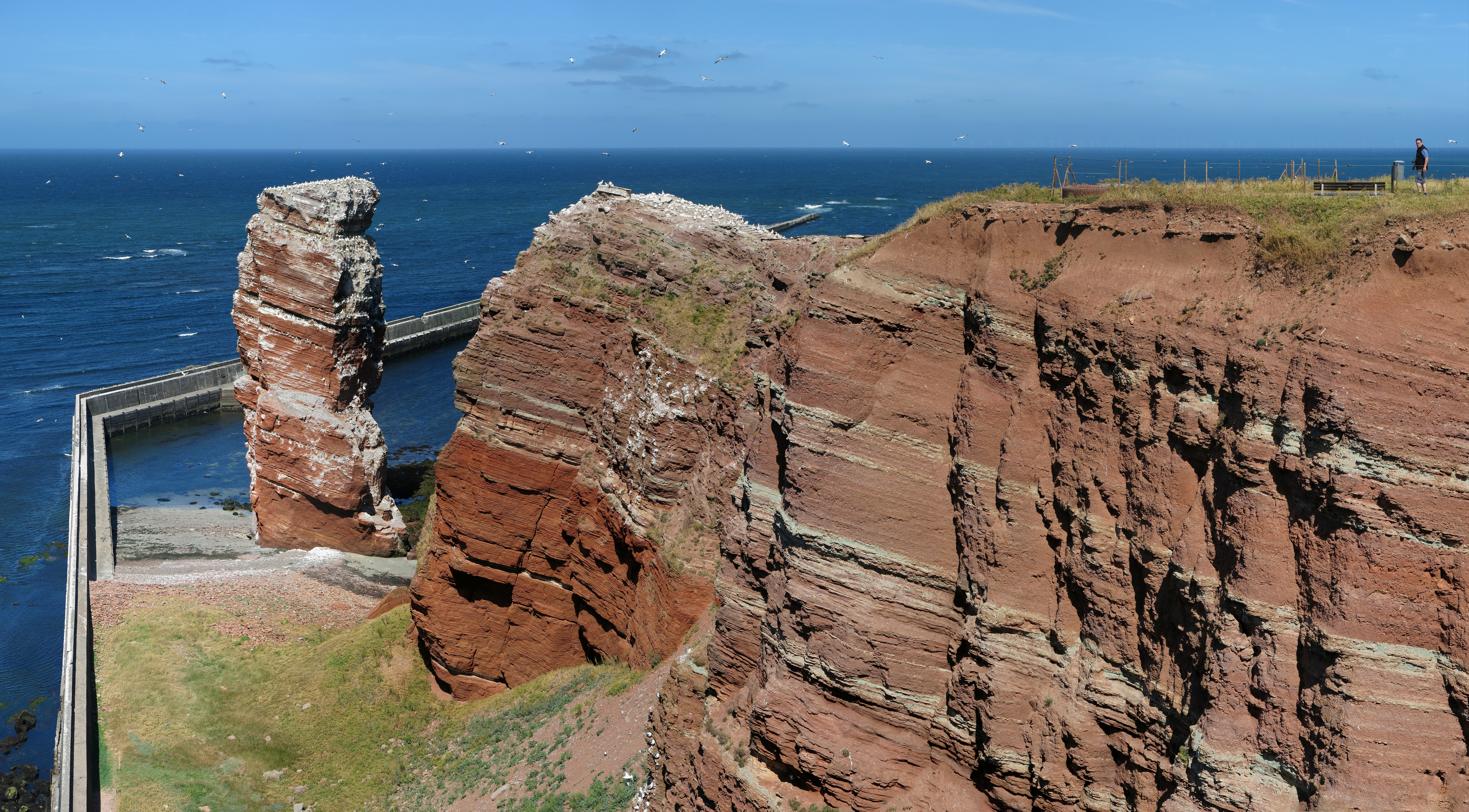
The Lange Anna

Lange Anna ("Tall Anna"), is a 47-metre-high (154 ft) sea stack of Buntsandstein in the North Sea island of Heligoland, Germany. Its local name is Nathurn Stak ("Northern Stack"). Climbing the stack is not allowed but tourists may view the rock from a distance.

Lange Anna is somewhat similar to the Old Man of Hoy or Old Harry. In 1969 it was declared a natural monument.

The stack is subject to severe weathering wear and decomposition. It was decided that any further effort for its conservation could do nothing but slow down the process, so the Lange Anna today is consigned to its fate. Experts assume an acute danger of collapse of the top two thirds because of an unstable layer of sands 16 metres (52 ft) above sea level, which already is the thinnest part of Lange Anna.

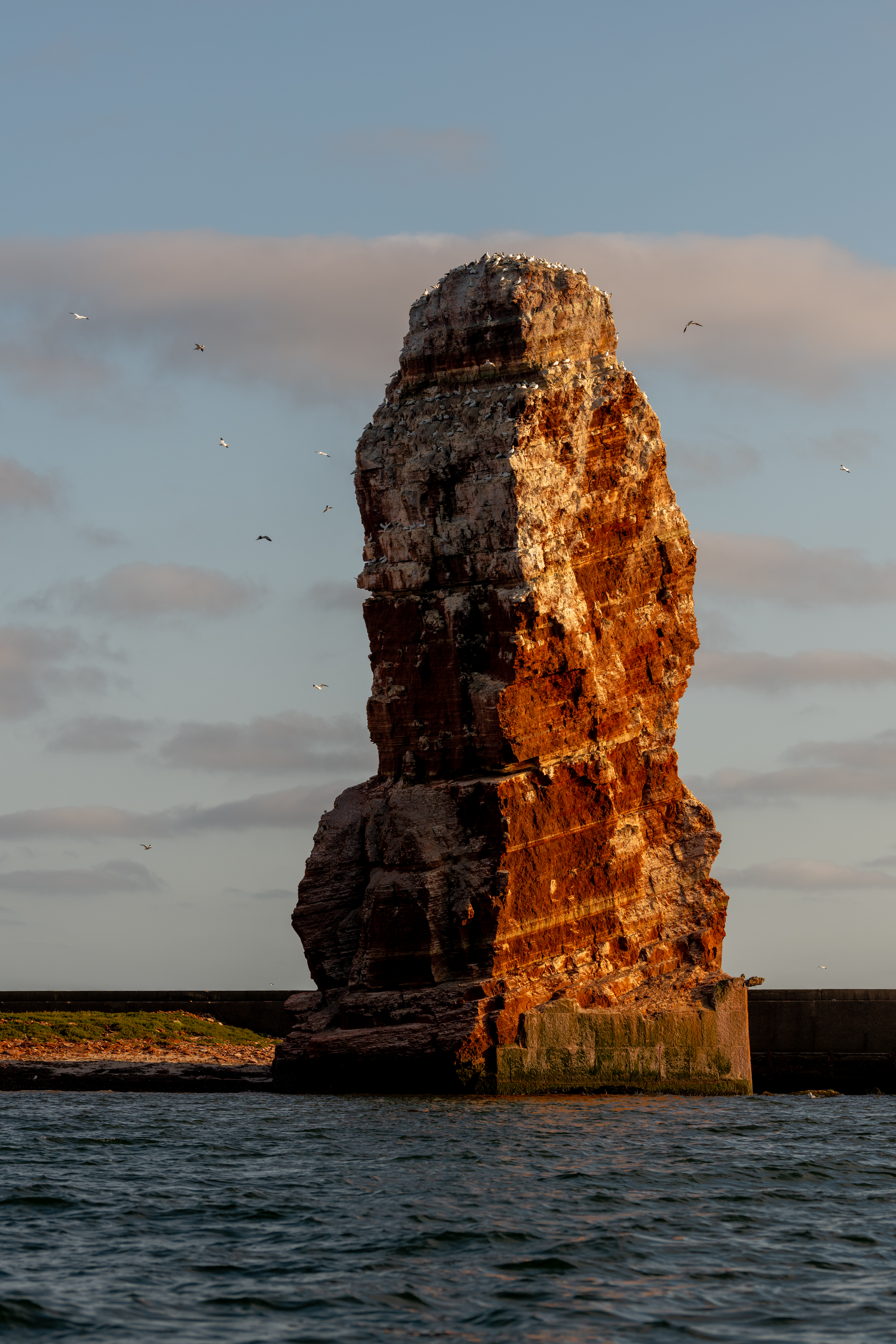
The Lange Anna (Nathurn Stak)
