= Flammenmergel =

Lithological unit in Germany

The Flammenmergel is a lithological unit of the Lower Chalk in Germany.

In Lower Saxony it reaches a depth of 110 to 150 m in the area of the Sackmulde (a fold in the Germanic Basin). The Flammenmergel gets its name from its "flamed" or "burnt" appearance.

This appearance is caused by the tracks of burrowing organisms, which consist primarily of siliceous sponge spicules which have been washed into the burrows. The silicic acid, when weathered, forms black streaks, which give the rock its characteristic appearance. The Flammenmergel is a slightly clayey to slightly sandy marl. It is yellow to ochre in colour, whereas the streaky "flames" are dark grey to black. The rock is siliceous and hard.
