= Buntsandstein =

Type of limestone

System	Series	Stage	Age (Ma)	European lithostratigraphy
Jurassic	Lower	Hettangian	younger	Lias
Triassic	Upper	Rhaetian	201.4–208.5	Lias
Triassic	Upper	Rhaetian	201.4–208.5	Keuper
Triassic	Upper	Norian	208.5–227.0	Keuper
Triassic	Upper	Carnian	227.0–237.0	Keuper
Triassic	Middle	Ladinian	237.0–242.0	Keuper
Triassic	Middle	Ladinian	237.0–242.0	Muschelkalk
Triassic	Middle	Anisian	242.0–247.2	Muschelkalk
Triassic	Middle	Anisian	242.0–247.2	Bunter or Buntsandstein
Triassic	Lower	Olenekian	247.2–251.2	Bunter or Buntsandstein
Triassic	Lower	Induan	251.2–251.9	Bunter or Buntsandstein
Permian	Lopingian	Changhsingian	older	Bunter or Buntsandstein
Permian	Lopingian	Changhsingian	older	Zechstein
Major lithostratigraphic units of northwest Europe with the ICS's geologic timescale of the Triassic.

The Buntsandstein (German for coloured or colourful sandstone) or Bunter sandstone is a lithostratigraphic and allostratigraphic unit (a sequence of rock strata) in the subsurface of large parts of west and central Europe. The Buntsandstein predominantly consists of sandstone layers of the Lower Triassic series and is one of three characteristic Triassic units, together with the Muschelkalk and Keuper that form the Germanic Trias Supergroup.

The Buntsandstein is similar in age, facies and lithology to the Bunter of the British Isles. It is normally lying on top of the Permian Zechstein and below the Muschelkalk. In the past the name Buntsandstein was in Europe also used in a chronostratigraphic sense, as a subdivision of the Triassic system. Among reasons to abandon this use was the discovery that its base lies actually in the latest Permian.

== Origin ==
The Buntsandstein was deposited in the Germanic Basin, a large sedimentary basin that was the successor of the smaller Permian Basin and spread across present day Poland, Germany, Denmark, the southern regions of the North Sea and Baltic Sea, the Netherlands and south England. In the late Permian this region had an arid climate and it was covered by inland seas which deposited the Zechstein evaporites. At the end of the Permian a connection with the Paleo-Tethys Ocean to the south was formed in present-day southeast Poland, causing sea water to flow in periodically. This caused the inflow of more clastic material, which was deposited in the form of large alluvial fans. The same process happened in the Triassic for the Basque-Cantabrian Basin, in the axis of the future Pyrenees.

Deposition took place in an arid, continental environment (playa facies), so that there was little chemical weathering. Therefore, the Buntsandstein deposits are typical red beds, mainly sandstones and conglomerates with little clay.

The late Anisian saw a major rise of the global (eustatic) sea level. A tropical sea filled the Germanic Basin then, stopping the deposition of the Buntsandstein and marking the beginning of the deposition of the Muschelkalk.

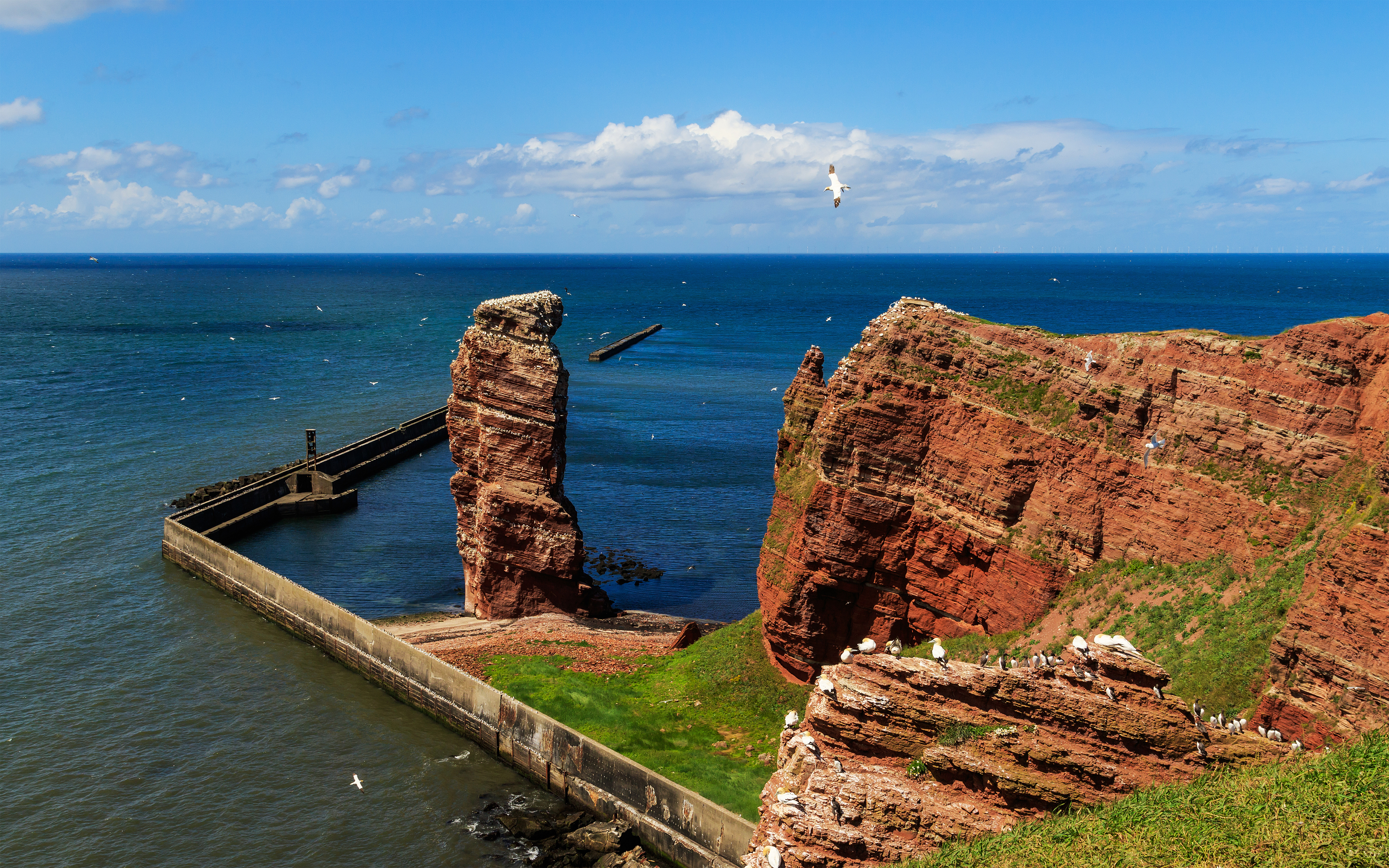
Buntsandstein outcrop on Heligoland. The stack is called Lange Anna (German: long Anna).

== Stratigraphy ==
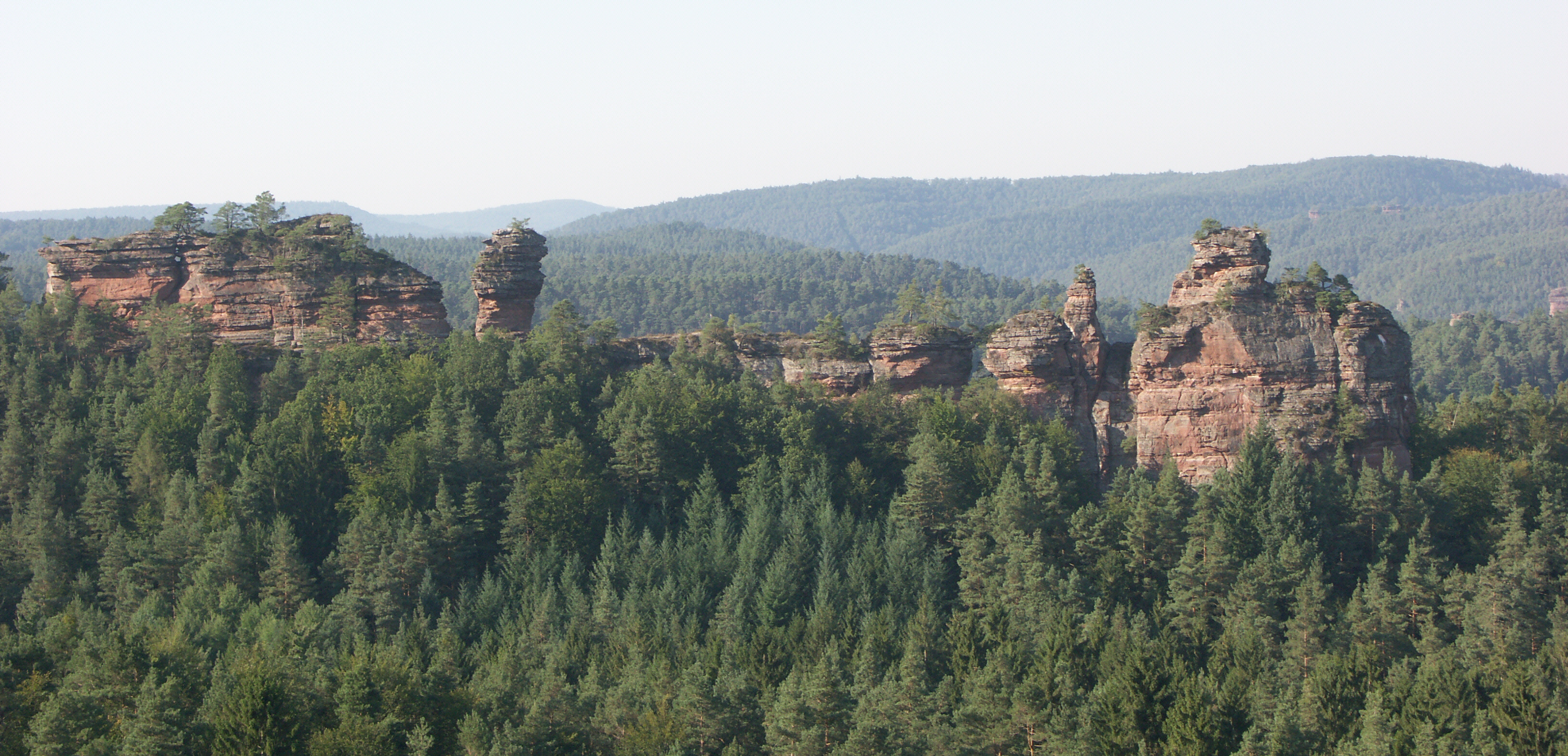
Heavily eroded Buntsandstein in the Palatinate Forest

The Buntsandstein belongs to the Changhsingian to Anisian stages, meaning it is between 252 and 246 million years old. In German lithostratigraphy, it is seen as a group, in the Netherlands and North Sea the name has no official status (though that does not keep geologists from using it). In the official Dutch lithostratigraphy, the Buntsandstein is divided into the Lower and Upper Germanic Trias Groups. The British Bunter Formation is basically a continuation of the same unit.

In Germany the Buntsandstein is subdivided into three subgroups with seven formations (from top to base):

Upper Buntsandstein

- Röt Formation or Fährtensandstein

Middle Buntsandstein

- Solling Formation
- Hardegsen Formation
- Detfurth Formation
- Volpriehausen Formation

Lower Buntsandstein

- Bernburg Formation
- Calvörde Formation

All of these are reasonably good reservoir rocks for oil and gas. In the Dutch subdivision, the upper two formations are part of the Upper Germanic Trias and the others part of the Lower Germanic Trias.

== Natural monuments ==
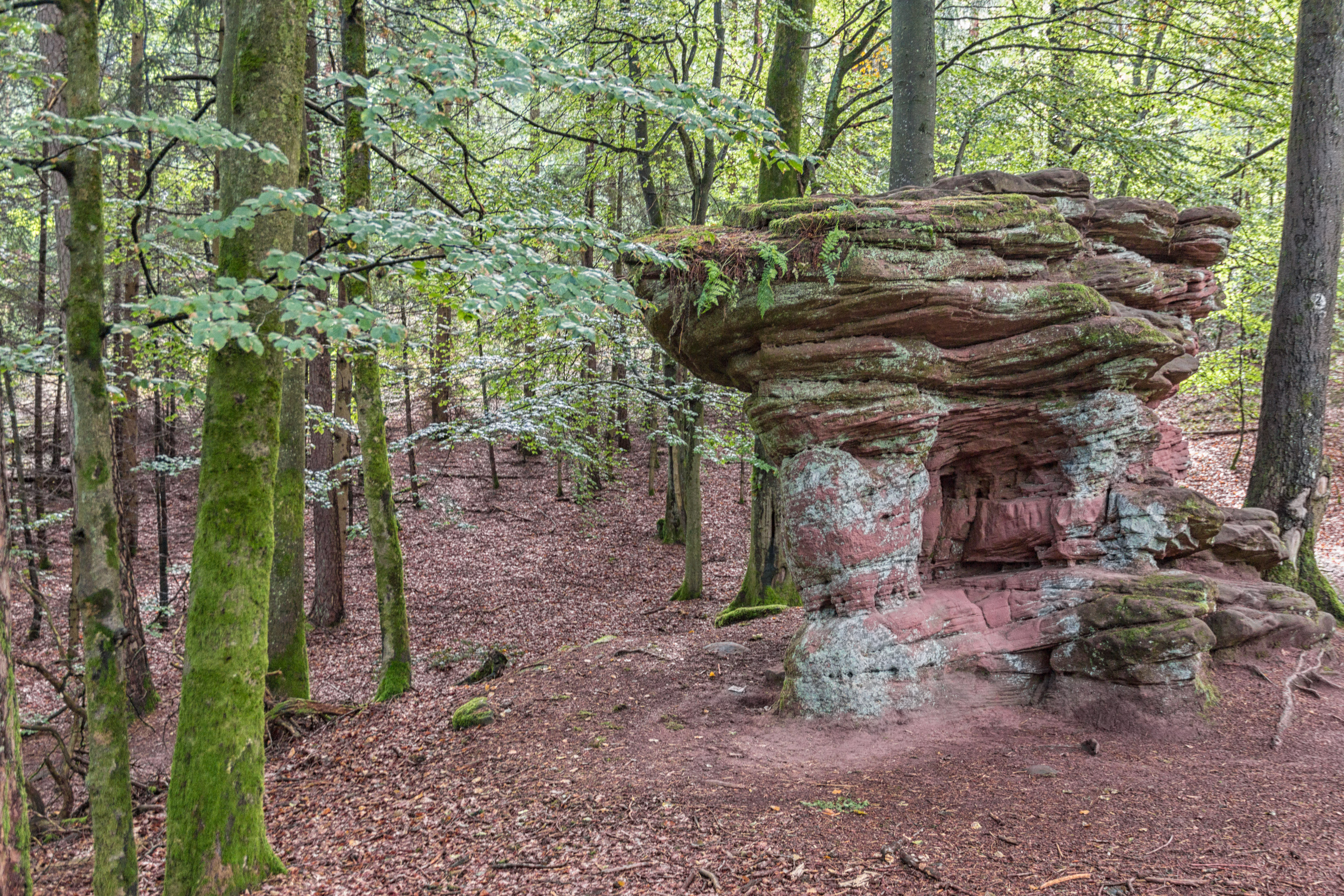
Natural monument "Teufelsschmiede" (Devil's Forge) in the Palatinate Forest

Bunter sandstone often forms spectacular rock formations as a result of weathering: including isolated rocks several tens of metres high. Most of them are designated natural monuments, for example, the Devil's Table near Hinterweidenthal. In the Palatinate, near Eppenbrunn, are the so-called Altschlossfelsen ("Old Castle Rocks"). The massif has a length of around 1.5 km and a height of up to 25 metres, easily the largest bunter sandstone massif in the Palatinate. On the island of Heligoland, the 47-metre-high Lange Anna ("Tall Anna"), is the best-known landmark on the island and was declared a natural monument in 1969.

== Fossils ==
The Buntsandstein contains a few small saurians, Chirotherium tracks, and plant remnants.

== See also ==
- Bunter (geology)
- List of sedimentary formations in Germany
