= Germanic Basin =

The Germanic Basin (German: Germanisches Becken) is a large region of sedimentation in Western and Central Europe that, during the Permian and Triassic periods, extended from England in the west to the eastern border of Poland in the east.

To the south it is bounded by the Vindelician Ridge (Vindelizische Schwelle) and, to the west and northwest, by the Armorican and London-Brabant Massifs. To the north the basin is bordered by the highlands of Ireland and Scotland, which were then still connected to the North American continent. To the east the basin was defined by the East European Platform, to the northeast by the Fennoscandian Shield (Scandinavia and Finland). The sedimentation began in the Rotliegendes with continental depositions. Later, during the Zechstein and Muschelkalk the region was largely flooded by the sea. Bunter sandstone and Keuper are again largely of continental origin. But even in these rocks the perimeter regions have marine influences, short incursions of the sea also reached the centre of the basin in northern Germany.

During the Zechstein the sea ingressed from the Arctic Ocean to the north into the basin. This gateway closed during the Uppermost Permian. In the Triassic these marine incursions came through several "portals" in the south of the basin e.g. the East Carpathian Gate (East Poland), the Silesian Gate (West Poland) and the Burgundian Gate (France). During the Rhaetian stage, new inlets formed in the northwest of the basin through the former highlands in Ireland and Scotland, which came from the Atlantic Ocean which was now opening up.

== Literature ==
- Gerhard Beutler und Joachim Szulc: Die paläogeographische Entwicklung des Germanischen Beckens in der Trias und die Verbindung zur Tethys. In: Norbert Hauschke und Volker Wilde (eds.): Trias Eine ganze andere Welt Mitteleuropa im frühen Erdmittelalter. pp.71-80, Verlag Dr. Friedrich Pfeil, Munich, 1999 ISBN 3-931516-55-5
