= Bunter (geology) =

Feature in geology

System	Series	Stage	Age (Ma)	European lithostratigraphy
Jurassic	Lower	Hettangian	younger	Lias
Triassic	Upper	Rhaetian	201.4–208.5	Lias
Triassic	Upper	Rhaetian	201.4–208.5	Keuper
Triassic	Upper	Norian	208.5–227.0	Keuper
Triassic	Upper	Carnian	227.0–237.0	Keuper
Triassic	Middle	Ladinian	237.0–242.0	Keuper
Triassic	Middle	Ladinian	237.0–242.0	Muschelkalk
Triassic	Middle	Anisian	242.0–247.2	Muschelkalk
Triassic	Middle	Anisian	242.0–247.2	Bunter or Buntsandstein
Triassic	Lower	Olenekian	247.2–251.2	Bunter or Buntsandstein
Triassic	Lower	Induan	251.2–251.9	Bunter or Buntsandstein
Permian	Lopingian	Changhsingian	older	Bunter or Buntsandstein
Permian	Lopingian	Changhsingian	older	Zechstein
Major lithostratigraphic units of northwest Europe with the ICS's geologic timescale of the Triassic.

Bunter Pebble Beds is the name formerly given to a set of sandstone deposits within the New Red Sandstone containing rounded pebbles. They are thought to be alluvial deposits and, judging from the rounding of the mainly quartzite pebbles, to have resulted from prolonged transportation in a large and turbulent river, resulting in powerful abrasion.

== Etymology ==
The name "Bunter" derives from the German term "Buntsandstein", "bunt" meaning "variegated" or "colourful", referring to the colour of the sandstone deposit, which varies from reddish to greenish.

== Utility ==
The pebbles, also called cobbles, which can be used as gravel, as ballast or as cobblestones, are mainly milky-white quartzite but can vary in colour and composition, including some that are hard, reddish-coloured sandstone. The sandstone in which these pebbles are deposited can be used for building or as an aggregate for cement or concrete.

The sandstone can be hard enough for building, yet easy enough to "work", resulting in bridges, castles, cathedrals and churches constructed of reddish sandstone, throughout the relevant areas of Europe (e.g. Germany, Luxembourg, Switzerland, Alsace in France, Denmark, Poland). A notable example is Heidelberg in the German state of Baden-Württemberg, whose old town, including the Old Bridge and the castle, is built mostly from the local Odenwald sandstone. Within the parkland surrounding the castle ramparts, there is also a publicly accessible outcrop mentioned in many local nature guides, where the succession from greyish granite to reddish buntsandstein is marked clearly by an eroded gap. The architecture of the surrounding former Palatinate territory, as well as the neighbouring Rhenish Hesse, modern Palatinate, Odenwald and Alsace areas traditionally make use of the building material for representative and public buildings, among them the historically important Straßburger Münster, and the Imperial Cathedrals of Speyer, Mainz, and Worms, as well as many burgeois residences, manors and medieval castles like Trifels and the Château du Haut-Kœenigsburg.

== Location ==
The deposits in the English Midlands are thought to have been transported in this way northwards from Brittany, France. This supposed river has been called the "Budleighensis", after the Devon village of Budleigh Salterton, a site where such deposits were discovered. Their deposition took place in the early Triassic period. Some newer conglomerates, e.g. near Ryton in Warwickshire, are thought to have arisen during the Ice Age by reworking and southward transportation of older deposits by ice flows.

They can be found in Warwickshire, Cheshire, Staffordshire, Nottinghamshire, Yorkshire, Devon and Dorset in England. This sandstone is widespread across central Europe, notably in the Black Forest and Odenwald region of Germany, as well as the Vosges Mountains in northeastern France. The land under which these beds lie is generally very well drained, creating heathlike conditions. Because of the drainage, the soil tends to be of low fertility. A notable area in Britain that has these characteristics is Cannock Chase, a designated Area of Outstanding Natural Beauty (AONB).

The long shingle tombolo of Chesil Beach in Dorset and the raised beach of Portland, Dorset are partly composed of Bunter pebbles.
