= Muschelkalk =

Lithostratigraphic unit in Europe

| System | Series | Stage | Age (Ma) | European lithostratigraphy |
|---|---|---|---|---|
| Jurassic | Lower | Hettangian | younger | Lias |
| Triassic | Upper | Rhaetian | 201.4–208.5 | Lias |
| Triassic | Upper | Rhaetian | 201.4–208.5 | Keuper |
| Triassic | Upper | Norian | 208.5–227.0 | Keuper |
| Triassic | Upper | Carnian | 227.0–237.0 | Keuper |
| Triassic | Middle | Ladinian | 237.0–242.0 | Keuper |
| Triassic | Middle | Ladinian | 237.0–242.0 | Muschelkalk |
| Triassic | Middle | Anisian | 242.0–247.2 | Muschelkalk |
| Triassic | Middle | Anisian | 242.0–247.2 | Bunter or Buntsandstein |
| Triassic | Lower | Olenekian | 247.2–251.2 | Bunter or Buntsandstein |
| Triassic | Lower | Induan | 251.2–251.9 | Bunter or Buntsandstein |
| Permian | Lopingian | Changhsingian | older | Bunter or Buntsandstein |
| Permian | Lopingian | Changhsingian | older | Zechstein |
Major lithostratigraphic units of northwest Europe with the ICS's geologic timescale of the Triassic.

The Muschelkalk (German for "shell-bearing limestone", pronounced [ˈmʊʃl̩ˌkalk]) is a sequence of sedimentary rock strata (a lithostratigraphic unit) in the geology of central and western Europe. It has a Middle Triassic (240 to 230 million years) age and forms the middle part of the three-part Germanic Trias (that gives the Triassic its name) lying above the older Buntsandstein and below the younger Keuper. The Muschelkalk ("mussel-chalk") consists of a sequence of limestone and dolomite beds.

In the past, the time span in which the Muschelkalk was deposited could also be called "Muschelkalk". In modern stratigraphy, however, the name only applies to the layers of rock.

== Occurrence ==
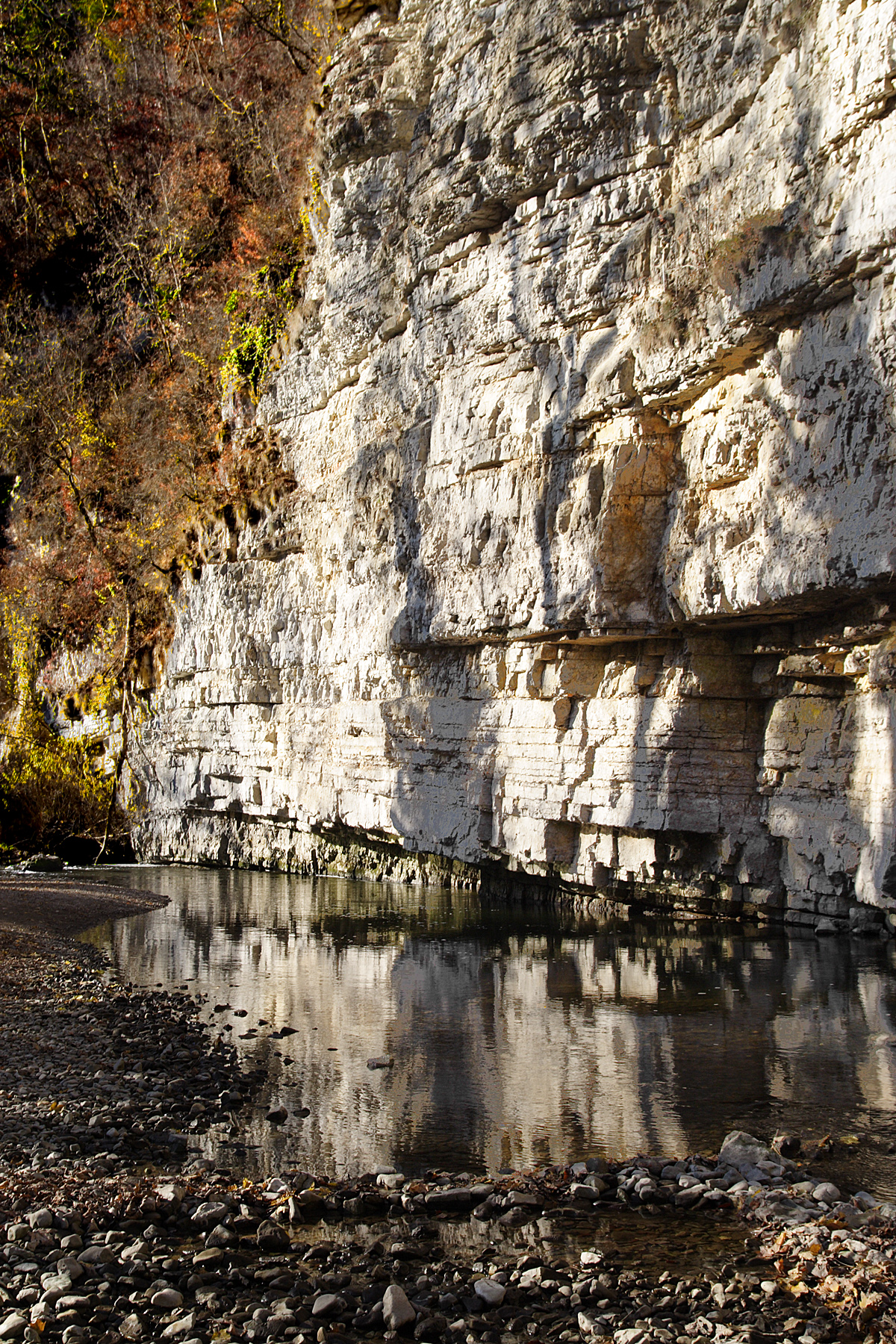
An outcrop of Muschelkalk cliffs forms the shore of the Wutach River, in the south of Baden-Württemberg.

The name Muschelkalk was first used by the German geologist Georg Christian Füchsel (1722–1773). In 1834, Friedrich August von Alberti included it in the Triassic system. The name indicates a characteristic feature of the unit; namely, the frequent occurrence of lenticular banks composed of fossil shells. The Muschelkalk is restricted to the subsurface in most of Germany and adjacent regions as the Low Countries, the North Sea and parts of Silesia, Poland and Denmark. Outcrops are found in Thuringia, the Harz, Franconia, Hesse, Swabia, and the Saarland and in Alsace.

The Muschelkalk was deposited in a land-locked sea that, in the earlier part of its existence, had only imperfect communications with the more open waters of the Tethys Ocean to the south. The basin in which the Muschelkalk was deposited is called the Germanic Basin.

Sometimes stratigraphic units with the same age from the Alps, southern Europe, and even Asia are also called Muschelkalk. Of course, these rocks have little history in common with the central European Muschelkalk except for similarities in fossil content. Closer at hand, the Alpine Muschelkalk differs in many respects from that of central Europe, and in its characteristic fossil fauna has a closer affinity with the Triassic Tethys realm.

== Stratigraphy ==
The Muschelkalk can be up to 100 meters thick; it is divisible into three subdivisions, of which the upper and lower are pale thin-bedded limestones with greenish-grey marls, the middle group being composed of gypsiferous and saliniferous marls with dolomite. Stylolites are common in all the Muschelkalk limestones.

The lithostratigraphic status of the Muschelkalk differs regionally. In Germany it is considered a group, in the Netherlands a formation.

=== Germany ===
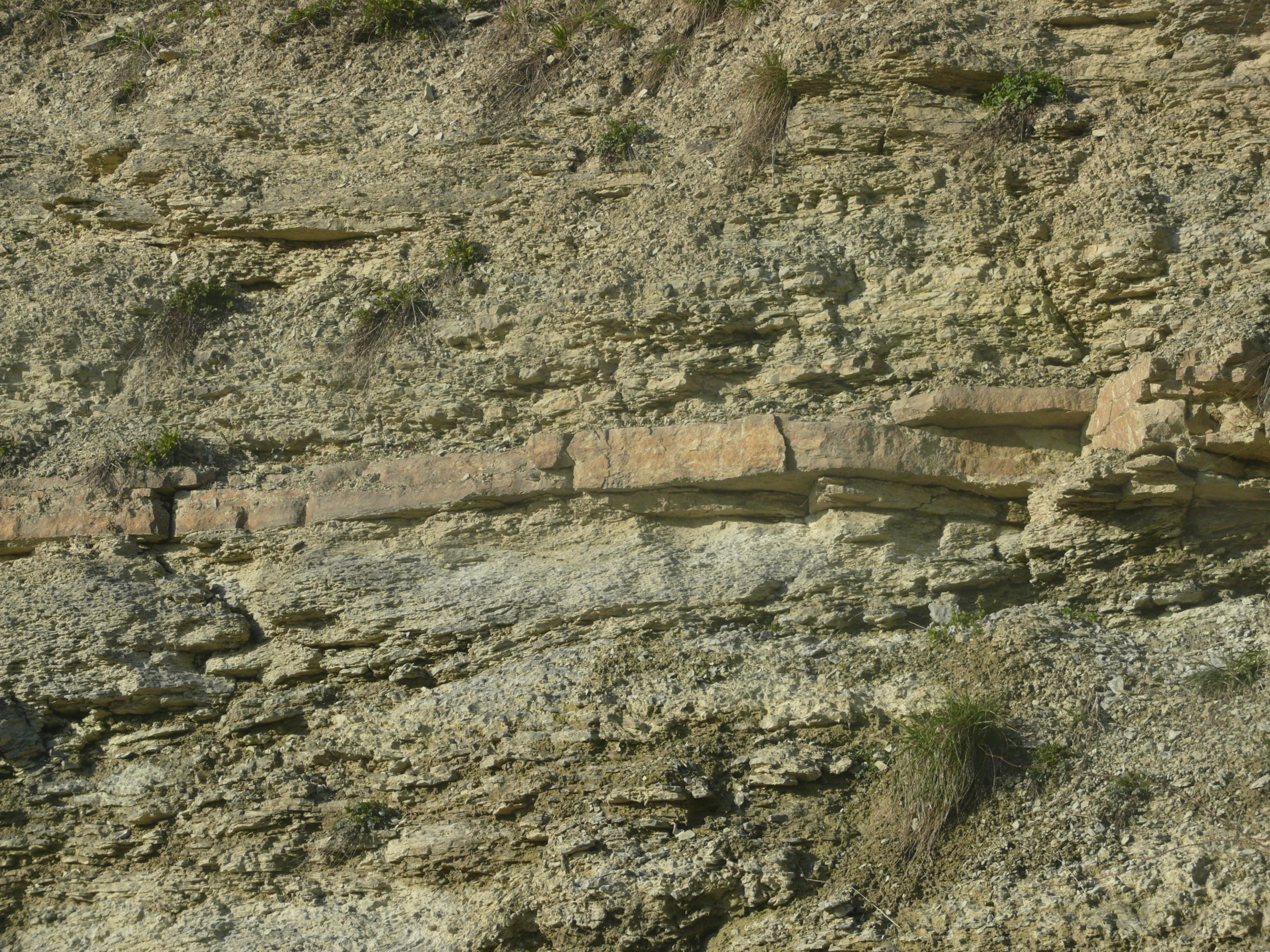
The top of the hard limestone (Schaumkalk) bed forms the top of the Wellenkalk or Lower Muschelkalk and the base of the Orbicularismergel, part of the Karlstadt-Formation. Outcrop near Dörzbach, Baden-Württemberg.

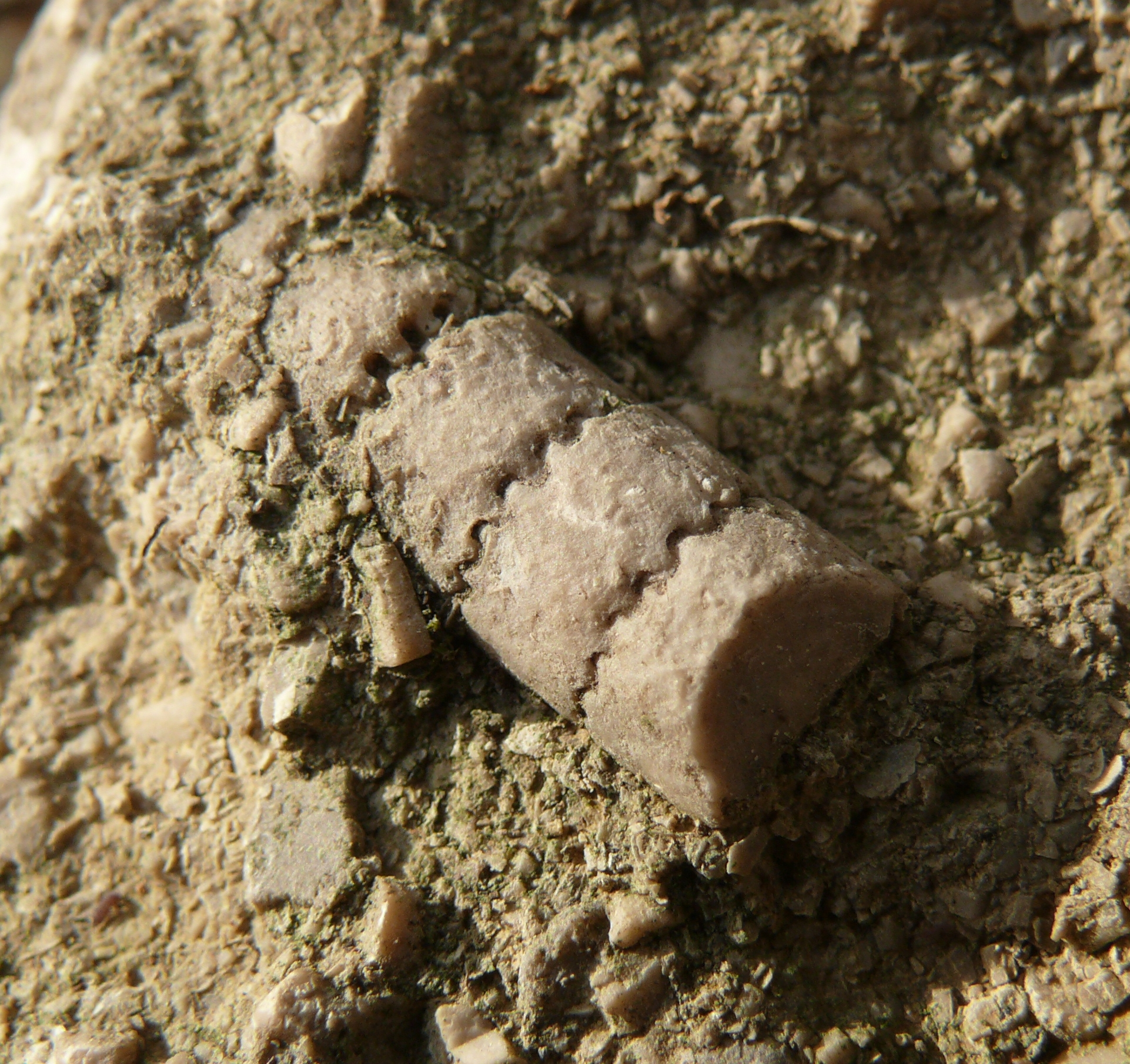
Fossils of Encrinus liliiforrnis from the Upper Muschelkalk at Kirchberg an der Jagst, Baden-Württemberg. Field of view approximately 20mm

The German Muschelkalk Group is subdivided into three subgroups: Upper, Middle and Lower Muschelkalk. The Lower Muschelkalk consists mainly of limestone, calcareous marls and clayey marls. Some beds are composed of porous cellular limestone, the so-called Schaumkalk, there are also oolite beds. The Lower Muschelkalk is divided into six formations: Jena Formation, Rüdersdorf Formation, Udelfangen Formation, Freudenstadt Formation and Eschenbach Formation. The Lower Muschelkalk is sometimes called Wellenkalk, German: Welle the "wave" chalk, so called on account of the buckled wavy character the bedding has received. In the Saarland and Alsace and northern Eifel, the Lower Muschelkalk has more sandy beds, the Muschelsandstein., "mussel sandstone"

The Middle Muschelkalk or Anhydrite Group consists mainly of evaporites (gypsum, anhydrite and halite) and is divided into three formations: Karlstadt Formation, Heilbronn Formation and Diemel Formation. The sedimentary facies at the margins of the Germanic Basin is different and these deposits are classified as a separate formation, the Grafenwöhr Formation, which continues into the Upper Muschelkalk. In the Middle Muschelkalk, weathering can form characteristic cellular dolomite (Zellendolomit).

The Upper Muschelkalk (Hauptmuschelkalk) is similar to the Lower Muschelkalk and consists of regular beds of shelly limestone, marl and dolomite. It is divided into six formations: Trochitenkalk, Meißner Formation, Irrel Formation, Gilsdorf Formation and Warburg Formation. The lower portion or Trochitenkalk is often composed entirely of the fragmentary stems of the crinoid Encrinus liliiformis; higher up come beds with a series of ammonites, Ceratites compressus, Ceratites nodosus, and Ceratites semipartitus in ascending order. In Swabia and Franconia the highest beds are platy dolomites with Tringonodus sandergensis and the crustacean Bairdia.

== Fossil content ==
In addition to the fossils mentioned above, the following are Muschelkalk forms: Coenothyris vulgaris, Mentzelia mentzeli and Spiriferina hirsuta, Myophoria vulgaris, Rhynchotites hirundo, Ceratites munsteri, Ptychites studeri, Balatonites balatonicus, Aspidura scutellata, Daonella lommeli, and in the Alpine region several rock-forming algae (for example, Baciryllium, Gyroporella, and Diplopora).

== Exploration ==
The salt beds are worked at Halle (Saale), Bad Friedrichshall, Heilbronn, Szczecin and Erfurt. It is from this division that many of the mineral springs of Thuringia and south Germany obtain their saline contents.

== See also ==
- Teufelshöhle (near Steinau)
