= Keuper =

Lithostratigraphic unit in Europe

System	Series	Stage	Age (Ma)	European lithostratigraphy
Jurassic	Lower	Hettangian	younger	Lias
Triassic	Upper	Rhaetian	201.4–208.5	Lias
Triassic	Upper	Rhaetian	201.4–208.5	Keuper
Triassic	Upper	Norian	208.5–227.0	Keuper
Triassic	Upper	Carnian	227.0–237.0	Keuper
Triassic	Middle	Ladinian	237.0–242.0	Keuper
Triassic	Middle	Ladinian	237.0–242.0	Muschelkalk
Triassic	Middle	Anisian	242.0–247.2	Muschelkalk
Triassic	Middle	Anisian	242.0–247.2	Bunter or Buntsandstein
Triassic	Lower	Olenekian	247.2–251.2	Bunter or Buntsandstein
Triassic	Lower	Induan	251.2–251.9	Bunter or Buntsandstein
Permian	Lopingian	Changhsingian	older	Bunter or Buntsandstein
Permian	Lopingian	Changhsingian	older	Zechstein
Major lithostratigraphic units of northwest Europe with the ICS's geologic timescale of the Triassic.

The Keuper is a lithostratigraphic unit (a sequence of rock strata) in the subsurface of large parts of west and central Europe. The Keuper consists of dolomite, shales or claystones and evaporites that were deposited during the Middle and Late Triassic epochs (about 220 million years ago). The Keuper lies on top of the Muschelkalk and under the predominantly Lower Jurassic Lias or other Early Jurassic strata.

The Keuper together with the Muschelkalk and the Buntsandstein form the Germanic Trias Group, a characteristic sequence of rock strata that gave the Triassic its name.

== Exposure ==
The Upper Triassic is well exposed in Swabia, Franconia, Alsace and Lorraine and Luxembourg; it extends from Basel on the east side of the Rhine into Hanover, and through England into Scotland and north-east Ireland; it appears flanking the central plateau of France and in the Pyrenees and Sardinia. The Keuper sequence is linked by name to the Keuper Uplands area of southern Germany.

In south Sweden, the lower portion contains coal-bearing strata, as in the Himalayas, Japan, Tibet, Burma, eastern Siberia and in Spitsbergen. The upper portion of the Karoo Supergroup of South Africa and part of the Otapiri stage of New Zealand are probably of Rhaetian age.

=== Germany ===
In Germany and adjacent parts of western and central Europe, the Keuper unit is divided into three groups:

- Upper Keuper

The upper part of this division is often a grey dolomite known as the Grenz dolomite; the impure coal beds Lettenkohle are aggregated towards the base. The upper Keuper, Rhaetic or Avicula contorta zone in Germany is mainly sandy with dark grey shales and marls; it is seldom more than 25 m thick (82 ft). The sandstones are used for building purposes at Bayreuth, Culmbach and Bamberg. In Swabia and the Wesergebirge are several bone-beds, thicker than those in the middle Keuper, which contain a rich assemblage of fossil remains of fish, reptiles and the mammalian teeth of Microlestes antiquus and Triglyptzas Fraasi. The name "Rhaetic" is derived from the Rhaetic Alps where the beds are well developed; they occur also in central France, the Pyrenees and England. In South Tirol and the Judicarian Mountains, the Rhaetic is represented by the Kossenei beds. In the Alpine region, the presence of coral beds gives rise to the so-called Lithodendron Kalk.

- Hauptkeuper or Gipskeuper, the middle

The middle division is thicker than either of the others (at Göttingen, 450 m, 1,480 ft); it consists of a marly series below, grey, red and green marls, with gypsum and dolomite—this is the gypskeuper in its restricted sense. The higher part of the series is sandy, hence called the Steinmergel; it is comparatively free from gypsum. To this division belong the Myophoria beds (M. Raibliana) with galena in places; the Estheria beds (E. laxilesta); the Schelfsandstein, used as a building-stone; the Lehrherg and Berg-gyps beds; Semionotus beds (S. Bergen) with building-stone of Coburg; and the Burgand Stubensandstein.

- Kohlenkeuper, Unterkeuper or Lettenkohle, the lower

The lower division consists mainly of grey clays and schieferletten with white, grey and brightly colored sandstone and dolomitic limestone.

The salt, which is associated with gypsum, is exploited in south Germany at Dreuze, Pettoncourt, as well as in Vie in the Lorraine region of France. A 4-metre (13 ft) coal is found on this horizon in the Ore Mountains on the border between Germany and the Czech Republic, and another, 2 metres thick (7 ft), has been mined in Upper Silesia, now in Poland.

=== Great Britain ===
In Great Britain the 'Keuper' is no longer a formally recognised geological division. The one-time Keuper Marls are now redesignated as the Mercia Mudstone Group. The underlying Keuper Sandstone is now the Helsby Sandstone Formation at the top of the Sherwood Sandstone Group. Traditionally it contained the following subdivisions:

- Rhaetic or Penarth

Grey, red and green marls, black shales, and so-called white (3.0–45.7 m, 10–150 ft). Upper Keuper marl, red and grey marls and shales with rock salt, 240–910 m (800–3,000 ft). As in Germany, there are one or more bone beds in the English Rhaetic with a similar assemblage of fossils.

- Lower Keuper

Sandstone, marls and thin sandstones at the top, red and white sandstones (including the so-called waterstones) below, with breccias and conglomerates at the base, 46–76 m (150–250 ft).

- Basal conglomerate

A shore or scree breccia derived from local materials; it is well developed in the Mendip district. The rocksalt beds vary from 25 cm (1 inch) to 30 metres (100 ft) in thickness; they are extensively worked (mined and pumped) in Cheshire, Middlesbrough and County Antrim.

The Keuper covers a large area in the Midlands and around the flanks of the Pennine range; it reaches southward to the east Devon coast, northeastward into Yorkshire and northwestward into Northern Ireland and southernmost Scotland.

== Fossils ==
The Keuper is not rich in fossils; the principal plants are cypresslike conifers (Walchia, Voltzia) and a few calamites with such forms as Equisetum arenaceum and Pterophyllum jaegeri. Avicula contorta, Protocardium rhaeticum, Terebratula gregaria, Myophoria costata, M. goldfassi, Lingula tenuessima, and Anoplophoria lettica may be mentioned among the invertebrates. The fish include Ceratodus, Hybodus and Lepidotus.

Labyrinthodonts represented by the footprints of Cheirotherium and the bones of Mastodonsaurus (originally called Labyrinthodon) and Capitosaurus. Among the reptiles are Hyperodapedon, Palaeosaurus, Zanclodon, Nothosaurus, Henodus and Belodon. The first fossil mammals also make their appearance at this time and the early beetle Triamyxa is also known from the Keuper.
