= Trossingen Formation =

Geological formation in Germany and Switzerland

- Stratigraphic range: Norian-Rhaetian; ~220–201 Ma
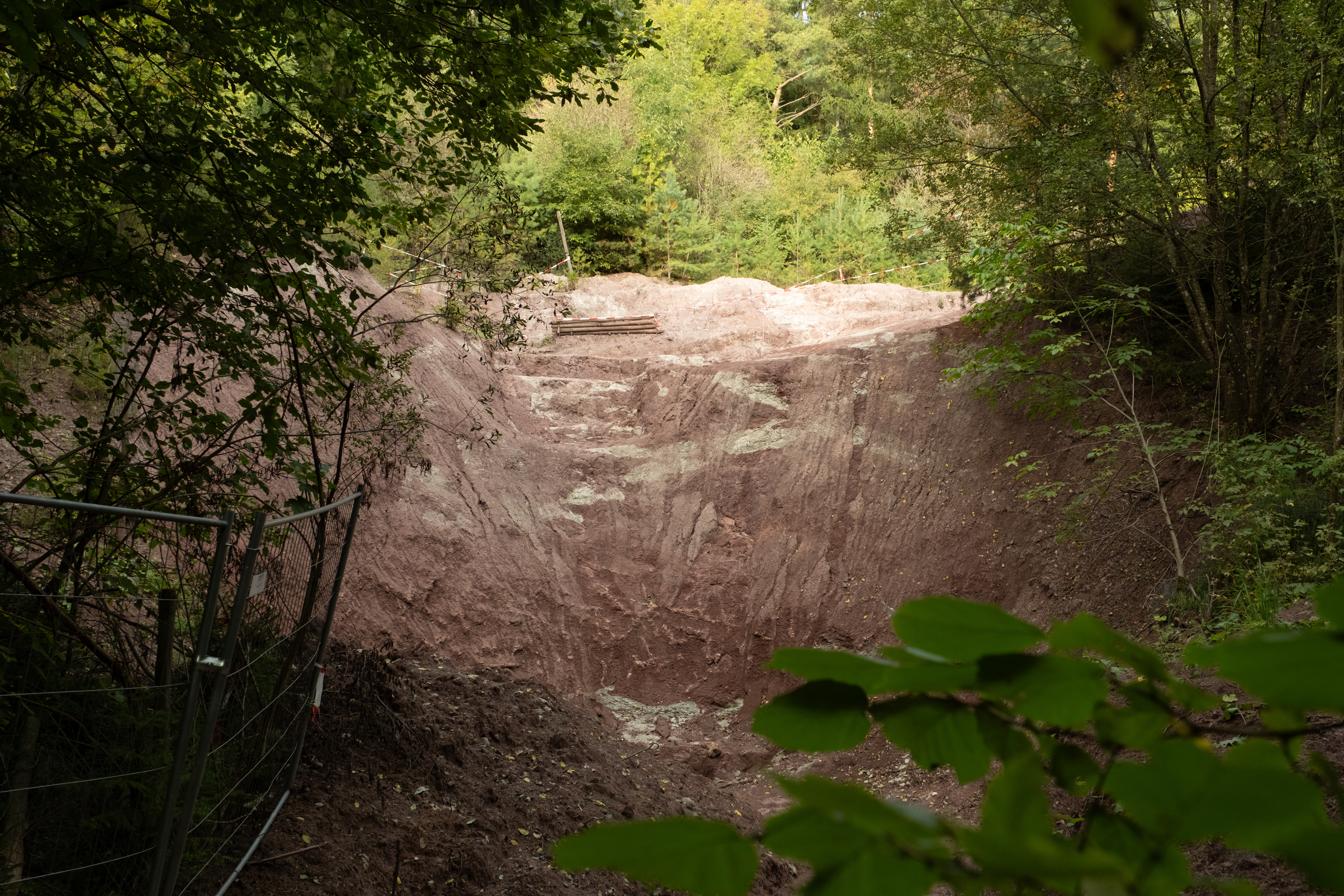
- Type exposure at Trossingen
- Type: Geological formation
- Unit of: Keuper
- Sub-units: Feuerletten, Grenzmergel & Knollenmergel Members
- Underlies: Exter Formation
- Overlies: Löwenstein Formation
- Thickness: Franconia: 55–60 m (180–197 ft); Southern Württemberg: 10 m (33 ft)

Lithology
- Primary: Marl, claystone
- Other: Mudstone, sandstone, conglomerate

Location
- Coordinates: 48.8°N 9.2°E
- Approximate paleocoordinates: 31.9°N 10.4°E
- Region: Central Europe
- Country: Germany, Switzerland
- Extent: Southern half of Germany

Type section
- Named for: Trossingen
- Named by: Beutler
- Year defined: 2005
- Trossingen Formation (Germany)

The Trossingen Formation, formerly the Knollenmergel (also known as the Arnstadt Formation or Feuerletten Formation), is a geological formation in Germany and Switzerland. It dates back to the late Norian-Rhaetian. It belongs to the Keuper Group of the Germanic Triassic. The Trossingen Formation is underlain by the Löwenstein Formation and erosively overlain by the Exter Formation, in part also directly by the Black Jurassic.

== Definition ==
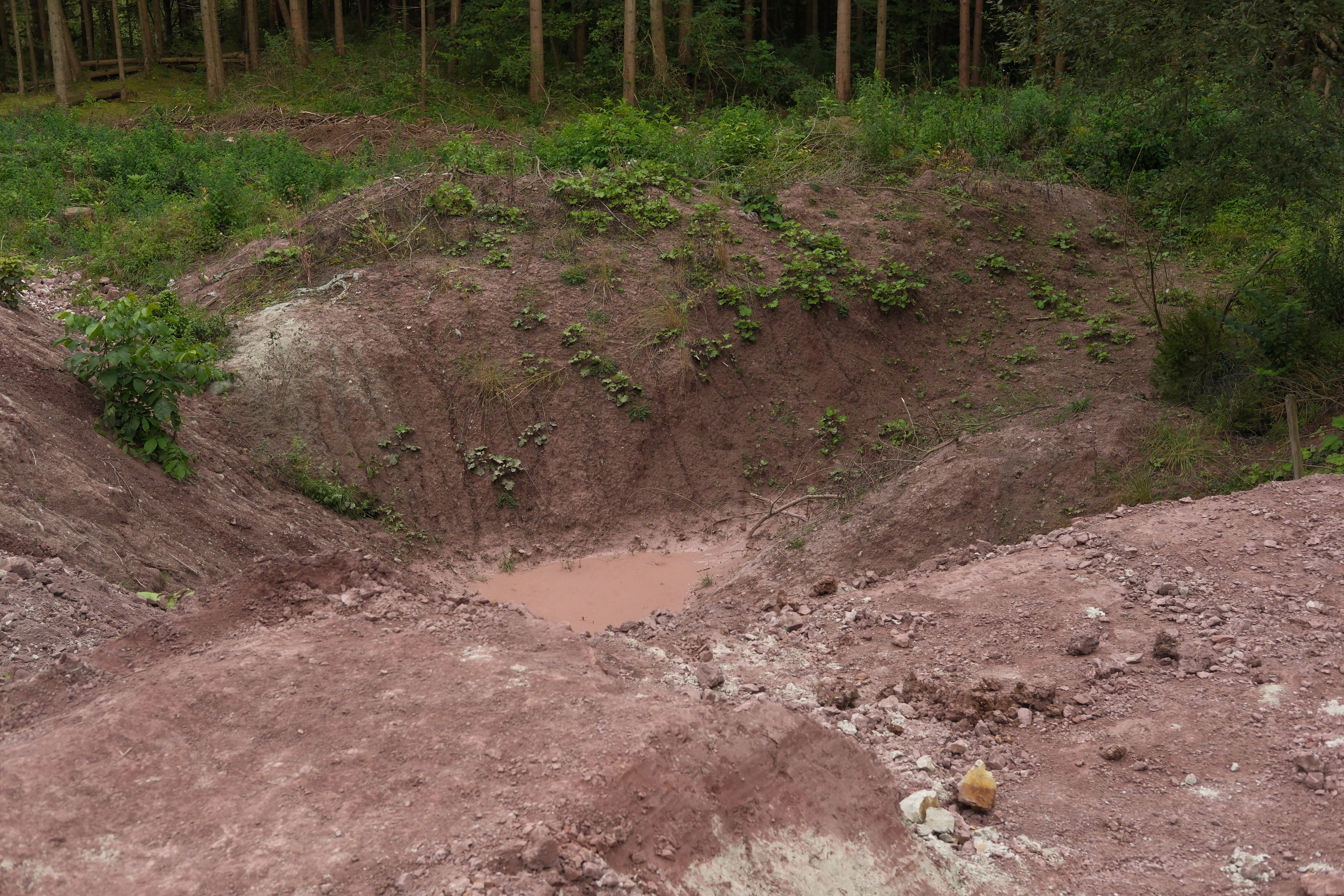
Outcrop at Trossingen

The horizontal boundary of the Trossingen Formation is a diachronous facies boundary and is characterized by the exposure of the sandstones of the Löwenstein Formation. The hanging wall boundary is also sharply defined facially and characterized by the erosive overburden with terrestrial sediments of various locally widespread strata of the Exter Formation (Malschenberg Clay or Sandstone, Contorta Clay, Tübingen Sandstone) or, in the case of the more extensive Upper Keuper Hiatus, directly with the dark marine mudstones of the Hettangian onwards Black Jurassic.

The Trossingen Formation itself consists of fairly uniform, reddish-brown to red, sometimes purple claystones with occasional layers of calcareous nodules (hence the name "Knollenmergel"). In northern Franconia, continuous limestone crusts several meters thick can also occur. Carbonaceous mudstones and silicified limestones also occur locally at the top of the succession.

The Trossingen Formation is restricted to the edge area of the Vindelizian Threshold and thus to the South German stratigraphic zone. The average thickness is about 40 to 50 m, in northern Franconia values between 55 and 60 m are reached. In southern Württemberg (Wutach area), the thickness decreases to 10 m. The differences in thickness are due on the one hand to the interlocking with the Löwenstein Formation and on the other hand to the Rhaetian/Early Jurassic erosion.

Chronostratigraphically, the Trossingen Formation is placed in the uppermost Norian or lower Rhaetian (upper Upper Triassic). The type locality or type profile is the impact slope of the Trosselbach near Trossingen (Tuttlingen district). It was named after the town of Trossingen. The type region is southwestern Baden-Württemberg.

The outcrops of the Trossingen Formation are characterized by so-called "hummocky" meadows. It forms very heavy soils (minute soil), which can be recognized by typical tree growth (crooked and leaning trees), and is prone to frequent landslides after rainfall. Tuberous marl landscapes can often only be used for orchards.

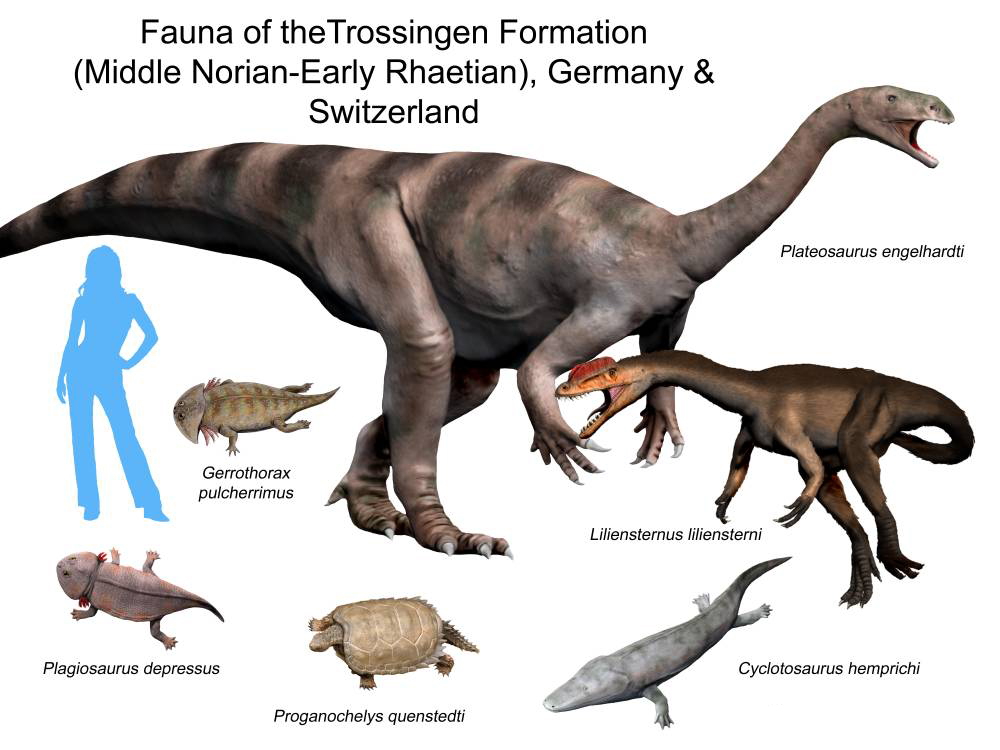
Selected fauna of the Trossingen Formation

Due to its richness in claystone, the Knollenmergel, like many Keuper formations, is a difficult subsoil for buildings of any kind because the claystones contain three-layer clay minerals that are swellable due to water retention in the intermediate layers. Intensive arable farming is therefore also problematic due to the fact that it is highly dependent on weather conditions. Like many claystone-dominated rock sequences, nodular marl tends to creep on slopes. This manifests itself in the sabre growth of trees on slopes.

The lithology of the Trossingen Formation, particularly at the Trossingen dinosaur site, is dominated by fine-grained sediments with minimal stratification, indicating post-depositional disturbance. Sandstones are rare, appearing only as thin intercalations in certain areas. Is dominated by mudstones with varying compositions and colors, divided into three main stratigraphic units: the lower beds, dark purple, marbled mudstones rich in carbonates. They contain calcitic replacements of small roots and show signs of pedogenic processes, including mud cracks and pseudobreccias. The presence of carbonate is highest in these beds, contributing to their distinctive texture and appearance. Next are homogeneous red-brown beds of light reddish-brown mudstones with lower carbonate content. They contain occasional small, round carbonate nodules, which increase in size and clustering towards the lower part of the unit. The last beds range from light purple to brown mudstones and have moderate carbonate content. Some layers contain calcitic root replacements, scattered carbonate nodules, and mud cracks that transition into pseudobreccias. This unit lacks the marbled appearance of the Lower Beds but shares similarities in texture and composition.

== Historical Work ==
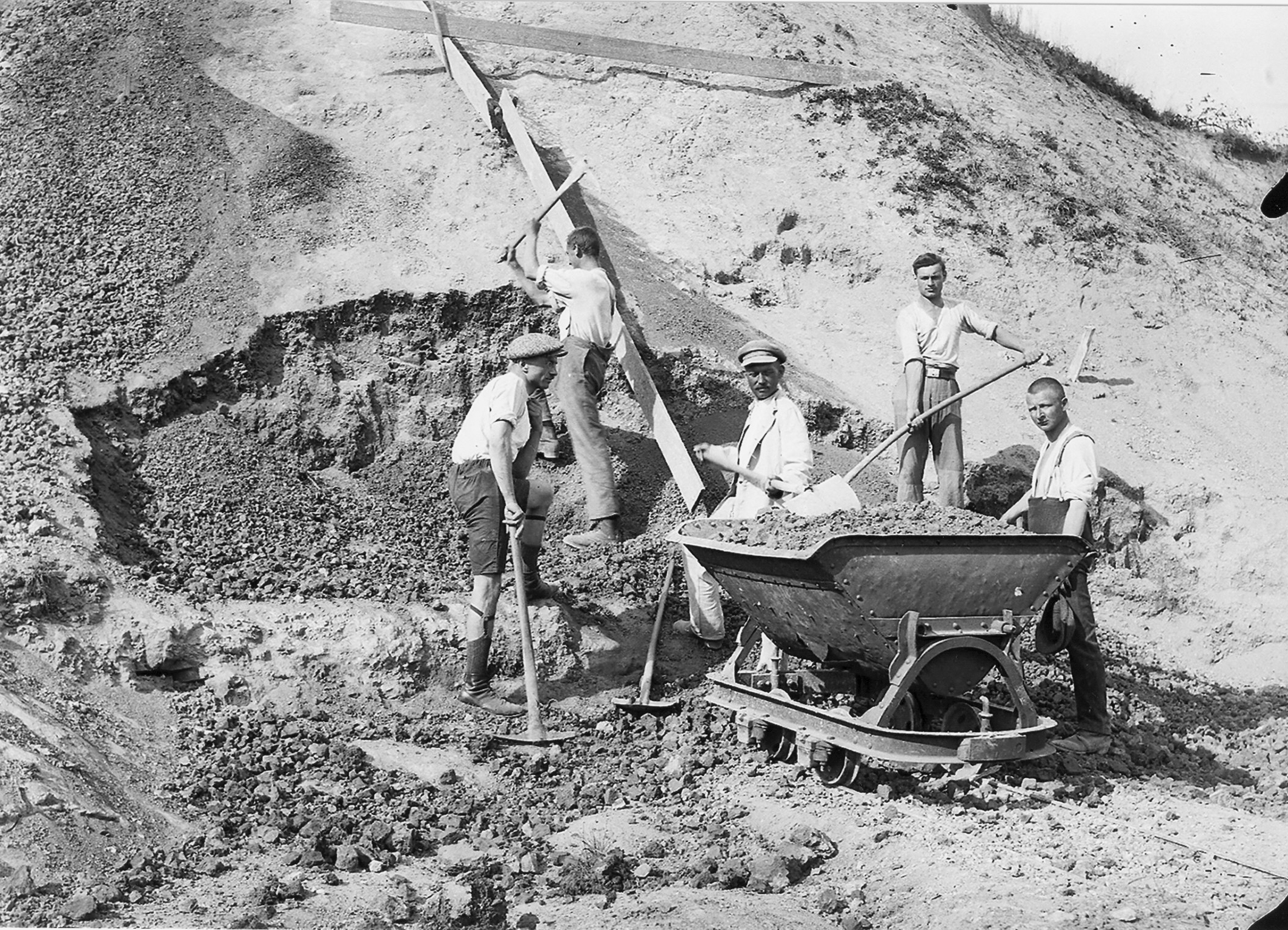
Excavation in Trossingen, 1912

The Trossingen Formation's excavation history dates back to the early 20th century when a schoolboy stumbled upon dinosaur bone fragments at a site known as "the Rutschete". His discovery caught the attention of local scientists, leading to initial excavations by Eberhard Fraas in 1911. By 1912, his team had uncovered scattered bones and two articulated skeletons, one of which remains one of the best-preserved plateosaur specimens.

Friedrich von Huene, aware of the site since 1904 but initially lacking funds, launched his own major excavation in 1921, supported by the American Museum of Natural History and local entrepreneurs. His team unearthed 12 Plateosaurus skeletons, employing university students under spartan conditions. His findings were split between Tübingen, the AMNH, and later Yale University. Huene originally theorized that the dinosaurs perished in an arid desert setting but later modified his view to suggest that the animals died of exhaustion near a muddy water source.

A large-scale excavation followed in 1932, led by Reinhold Seemann from the Stuttgart Natural History Museum. With a team of 25, he unearthed 39 individual skeletons, noting that the Lower Dinosaur Bed contained better-preserved material. Seemann refuted Huene's desert hypothesis, instead proposing that the region once held a lake, and supported the idea that many Plateosaurus specimens became trapped in mud. His meticulous field notes and maps provided a detailed record of the site, though much of the material was later destroyed in World War II.

Interest in the site waned after 1932, with subsequent research relying on past records. Later studies, including those by Weishampel in the 1980s and Sander in 1992, refined theories on the formation's depositional history, emphasizing miring as a key factor in preserving the dinosaurs.

Excavations resumed in 2007, conducted by the Staatliches Museum für Naturkunde Stuttgart. Over multiple campaigns, new fossil-bearing layers were identified, revealing additional Plateosaurus skeletons and providing fresh insights into the site's sedimentology and paleoenvironment.

== Paleoenvironment ==
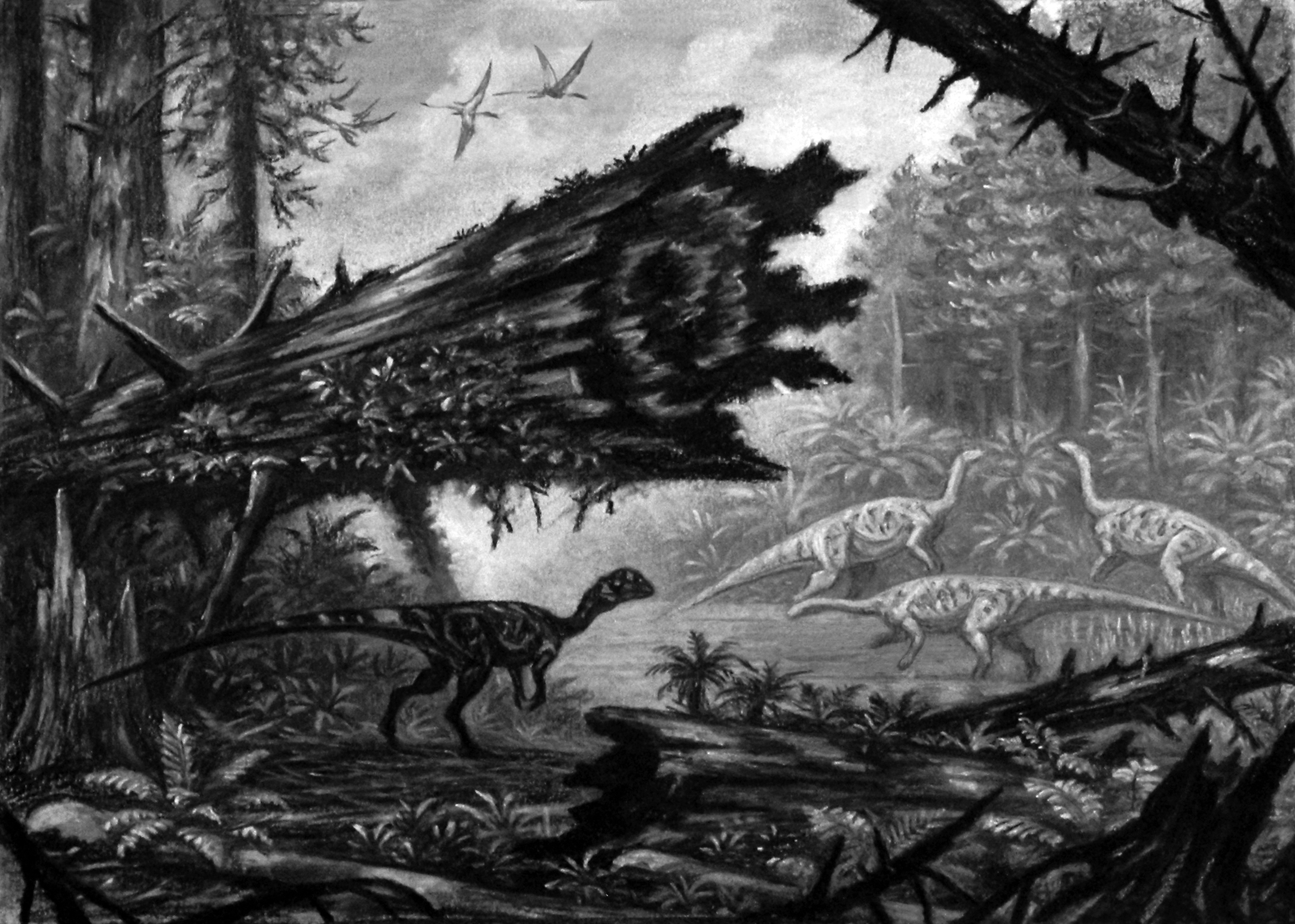
Paleoenvironment reconstruction

The Trossingen Formation facies formed as a result of episodic sheet floods in a well-drained playa basin. This region was heavily influenced by the Triassic Pangaean monsoon system, often referred to as a "megamonsoon". While many Keuper clay beds contain evaporitic sulphate minerals, the deposits are unique in their lack of such minerals, despite showing desiccation features like mudcracks. This suggests they were deposited on a dry mudflat where groundwater was too deep for evaporite formation, allowing pedogenic processes to dominate. The playa stretched from northern Switzerland through parts of Germany, including Baden-Württemberg, Bavaria, Thuringia, and Saxony-Anhalt, transitioning into central playa lake and lacustrine facies further north.

The paleoenvironment, particularly the Knollenmergel claystones, suggests a landscape shaped by alternating wet and dry conditions. The presence of features like pedogenic slickensides, pseudoanticlines, and deep desiccation cracks indicates that the sediments underwent significant soil formation processes. These characteristics align with vertisols-soils that form in climates with strong seasonal moisture fluctuations.

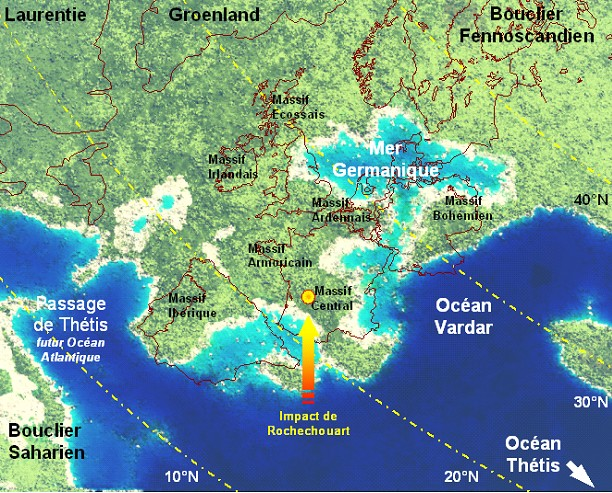
Paleogeography of Europe in the Norian

Heavily vegetated (dominated by equisetales) shallow endorheic lacustrine-palustrine areas are found, with greater plant covering developing around the own lake and smaller rivers (marked by sandstones and coalbeds). This deposits can be seen thanks to layers with massive claystones, variegated marls with calcareous nodules, calcareous marls, dark violet & carbonaceous claystones, carbonaceous shales, limestones (mudstones, ostracod wackestones, pseudoconglomeratic limestones, rhizoliths, pisoliths), cherts, silicified peat & coal, and sandstones.

The Knollenmergel paleosols likely developed through repeated deposition of clay-rich layers, each becoming integrated into the soil through swelling and shrinking processes. The widespread evidence of root structures suggests that vegetation was present at times, though oxidation may have destroyed other plant remains. Carbonate nodules, sometimes forming vertical "pillars," point to periods of increased aridity, leading to the formation of calcretes. The Red-Brown Beds, distinct in color and composition, likely represent a more arid phase, contrasting with the more humid conditions inferred for the purple vertisol layers.

Among the playa-alike deposits, Porcellispora longdonensis suggests communities of liverworts in ephemeral lakes similar to the extant genus Riella. Hypersaline conditions were marked by the alga Plaesiodictyon mosellanum. The dominant pollen is mostly of Hirmeriellaceae conifers (Classopollis, Granuloperculatipollis rudis) possibly representing adjacent river margins. Small marine incursions likely happened in the uppermost sections, based on associated freshwater Botryococcus with marine dinoflajellates (Micrhystridium, Veryhachium). This is reinforced in Fuchsberg and Langenberg near Seinstedt, with large deltaic sections flowing towards the early W sea incursions.

The Trossingen site also preserves numerous dinosaur fossils, particularly Plateosaurus, with many skeletons found in life-like postures. This suggests rapid burial, likely in soft, clay-rich sediments that acted as natural mud traps. Such conditions are consistent with the presence of gilgai—depressions in vertisol landscapes that can retain water and become hazards for large animals. The overall environmental picture is one of a floodplain subject to periodic drying and wetting, supporting intermittent vegetation and experiencing long-term soil development processes.

== Paleobiota ==
Color key: Taxon / Reclassified taxon / Taxon falsely reported as present / Dubious taxon or junior synonym / Ichnotaxon / Ootaxon / Morphotaxon

Notes
Uncertain or tentative taxa are in small text
~~crossed out~~ taxa are discredited.

=== Molluscs ===
Genus	Species	Location	Material	Notes	Images
Cardium	C. rhaeticum	Near Seinstedt	Shells	A Cardiidae bivalve	
Gervillia	G. praecursor	Near Seinstedt	Shells	A Bakevelliidae bivalve	
Gervillia	G. inflata	Near Seinstedt	Shells	A Bakevelliidae bivalve	
Isocyprina	I. (Taeniodon) ewaldi	Near Seinstedt	Shells	An Arcticidae bivalve	
Leda	L deffneri	Near Seinstedt	Shells	A Nuculanidae bivalve	
Mytilus	M. minutus	Near Seinstedt	Shells	A Mytilidae bivalve	Extant Mytilus
Paludina	aff. P. sp.	Baerecke-Limpricht clay pit	Shells	A viviparid gastropod	
Rhaetavicula	R. (Avicula) contorta	Near Seinstedt	Shells	A Pteriidae bivalve	
Taeniodon	T. praecursor	Near Seinstedt	Shells	An Arcticidae bivalve	
Unionites	U. postera	Baerecke-Limpricht clay pit	Shells	A unionid bivalve	
Unio	U. franconicus	Baerecke-Limpricht clay pit; Ellingen, "Am Tiergärtle"	Shells	A unionid bivalve	Extant Unio

=== Arthropods ===
Genus	Species	Location	Material	Notes	Images
Archelcana	A. sp.	Langenberg	Wings	An Elcanidae Cricket	
Caloblattinidae indet.	Indeterminate	Fuchsberg; Langenberg	Wings	Incertae sedis	
Chironomidae indet.	Indeterminate	Fuchsberg	Wings	Incertae sedis	Chironomidae example
Crivoptychoptera	C. nebrias	Fuchsberg	Wings	A Ptychopteridae Fly	
Cytherissinella	C. spp.	Ellingen, "Am Tiergärtle"	Shells	A Cytherissinellidae ostracod	
Darwinula	D. spp.	Ellingen, "Am Tiergärtle"	Shells	A Darwinulidae ostracod	
Dohloboyia	D. triassica	Fuchsberg	Wings	A Boholdoyidae Fly	
Dysmorphoptilidae indet.	Indeterminate	Langenberg	Wings	Incertae sedis	
Eucarida indet.	Indeterminate	Fuchsberg	Specimens	Incertae sedis	Eucarida example (Antarctic krill)
Eoptychopteridae indet.	Indeterminate	Fuchsberg	Wings	Incertae sedis	
Gregoriusella	G. polonica	Fuchsberg	Shells	An Euestheriidae Clam shrimp	
Hagloidea indet.	Indeterminate	Langenberg	Wings	Incertae sedis	Hagloidea example
Hydradephaga indet.	Indeterminate	Fuchsberg	Wings	Incertae sedis	Hydradephaga example
Ipsviciopsis	I. langenbergensis	Langenberg	Wings	An Ipsviciidae Hemipteran	
Italophlebia	I. baueri	Fuchsberg	Wings	A Dragonfly	
Larvaderus	L. triassicus	Fuchsberg	Larva	A Tanyderidae Fly	
Litogaster	L. keuperinus	Baerecke-Limpricht clay pit	Specimens	A Litogastridae Decapod	
Membracoidea indet.	Indeterminate	Langenberg	Wings	Incertae sedis	Membracoidea example
Mesotanyderus	M. sp.	Fuchsberg	Wings	A Mesopsychidae scorpionfly	
Paleolimulus	P. fuchsbergensis	Fuchsberg	Complete specimen	A Paleolimulidae Horseshoe crab	
Polyphaga indet.	Indeterminate	Fuchsberg	Wings	Incertae sedis	
Protomyrmeleontidae indet.	Indeterminate	Langenberg	Wings	Incertae sedis	
Pseudopolycentropus	P. sp.	Fuchsberg	Wings	A Pseudopolycentropodidae scorpionfly	
Ptychopteridae indet.	Indeterminate	Fuchsberg	Wings	Incertae sedis	Ptychopteridae example
Ramobuccina	R. herrigi	Fuchsberg	Pupa	Incertae sedis	
Sepulenia	S. sp.	Fuchsberg	Wings	A Sepulcidae sawfly	
Shipingia	S. gerbachmanni	Fuchsberg	Shells	A Shipingiidae Clam shrimp	
Shipingia	S. etzoldi	Fuchsberg	Shells	A Shipingiidae Clam shrimp	
Shipingia	S. olseni	Fuchsberg	Shells	A Shipingiidae Clam shrimp	
Simulipupa	S. curriei	Fuchsberg	Pupa	A Simuliidae Fly	
Syncarida indet.	Indeterminate	Fuchsberg	Specimens	Incertae sedis	Syncarida example
Triaplidae indet.	Indeterminate	Fuchsberg	Wings	Incertae sedis	
Voltziablattidae indet.	Indeterminate	Fuchsberg; Langenberg	Wings	Incertae sedis	

=== Fish ===
Genus	Species	Location	Material	Notes	Images
Acrodus	cf. A. sp.	Baerecke-Limpricht clay pit	Teeth	A hybodont Chondrichthyan	
Actinistia indet.	Indeterminate	Fuchsberg	Scales	Incertae sedis	
Birgeria	B. acuminata	Fuchsberg	Teeth	A Birgeriiformes bony fish	Birgeria
Birgeria	B. sp	"Phytosaur bonebed", Bitburg	Multiple teeth and scales	A Birgeriiformes bony fish	Birgeria
Ceratodus	C. latissimus	Niederschönthal, Liestal	Tooth plates	A ceratodontid lungfish	Ceratodus
Ceratodus	C. sp.	Niederschönthal, Liestal	Tooth plates	A ceratodontid lungfish	Ceratodus
Colobodus	cf. C. sp.	Baerecke-Limpricht clay pit; Fuchsberg	Teeth	A colobodontid bony fish	
Gyrolepis	G. albertii	Fuchsberg	Teeth	A Palaeonisciform bony fish	Gyrolepis
Gyrolepis	G. sp	"Phytosaur bonebed", Bitburg	Multiple teeth and scales	A Palaeonisciform bony fish	Gyrolepis
Hybodus	H. sp.	Niederschönthal, Liestal	Teeth	A hybodont Chondrichthyan	Hybodus
Hypsocormus?	cf.H. sp.	Baerecke-Limpricht clay pit	Teeth	Jurassic genus, likely misidentified.	
Lissodus	L. minimus	"Phytosaur bonebed", Bitburg	Multiple teeth and spine fragments	A hybodont Chondrichthyan	
Lissodus	L. nodosus	Fuchsberg	Teeth	A hybodont Chondrichthyan	
Nemacanthus	N. sp	"Phytosaur bonebed", Bitburg	Multiple teeth and spine fragments	A Synechodontiform Chondrichthyan	
Paralepidotus	P. sp	"Phytosaur bonebed", Bitburg	Multiple teeth and scales	A Semionotidae bony fish	
Parascylloides	P. turnerae	Fuchsberg	Teeth	A Synechodontiform Chondrichthyan	
Polyacrodus	P. sp	Fuchsberg	Teeth	A Polyacrodontidae Chondrichthyan	
Prolepidotus	P. spp.	Baerecke-Limpricht clay pit	Teeth	A lepisosteiform bony fish	
Pseudocetorhinus	P. pickfordi	Fuchsberg	Teeth	Incertae sedis	
Pseudodalatias	P. barnstonensis	Fuchsberg	Teeth	A Pseudodalatiidae Chondrichthyan	
Ptychoceratodus	P. sp.	"Phytosaur bonebed", Bitburg	Tooth plates	A ceratodontid lungfish	
Ptycholepididae indet.	Indeterminate	"Phytosaur bonebed", Bitburg	Tooth plates	Incertae sedis	
Rhomphaiodon	R. minor	Fuchsberg; "Phytosaur bonebed", Bitburg	Multiple teeth	A Synechodontiform Chondrichthyan	
Rhomphaiodon	R. nicolensis	Fuchsberg	Teeth	A Synechodontiform Chondrichthyan	
Saurichthys	S. sp	"Phytosaur bonebed", Bitburg	Multiple teeth and scales	A Saurichthyidae bony fish	
Seinstedtia	S parva	Fuchsberg	Nearly complete specimen	A Teleosteomorpha bony fish	
Serrolepis	S. suevicus	Fuchsberg	Teeth	A Polzbergiidae bony fish	
Synechodus	S. seinstedtensis	Fuchsberg	Teeth	A Synechodontiform Chondrichthyan	
Synechodus	S. "sp. 2"	Fuchsberg	Teeth	A Synechodontiform Chondrichthyan	

=== Amphibia ===
Genus	Species	Location	Material	Notes	Images
Cyclotosaurus	C. hemprichi	Baerecke-Limpricht clay pit	HMH, a complete large skull with mandible (62.5 cm)	A cyclotosaurid temnospondyl. Also known as Hemprichisaurus.	Cyclotosaurus
Cyclotosaurus	aff. C. posthumus	Baerecke-Limpricht clay pit	Desarticulated material	A cyclotosaurid temnospondyl. Also known as Hemprichisaurus.	Cyclotosaurus
Gerrothorax	G. pulcherrimus	Baerecke-Limpricht clay pit	Desarticulated material	A plagiosaurid temnospondyl.	Gerrothorax
Gerrothorax	G. sp.	Baerecke-Limpricht clay pit	Desarticulated material	A plagiosaurid temnospondyl.	Gerrothorax
"Hercynisaurus"	"H. carinidens"	Baerecke-Limpricht clay pit	Mandible	Considered a synonym of Cyclotosaurus.	
"Metoposaurus"	"M. ultimus"	Baerecke-Limpricht clay pit	Teeth	Considered a synonym of Cyclotosaurus.	
Plagiosaurus	P. depressus	Baerecke-Limpricht clay pit	MB.Am.637, posterolateral portion of skull; Multiple referred specimens	A plagiosaurid temnospondyl.	Plagiosaurus reconstruction
Plagiosaurus	P. sp.	Baerecke-Limpricht clay pit	Desarticulated material	A plagiosaurid temnospondyl.	Plagiosaurus reconstruction
"Saurischiocomes"	"S. keuperinus"	Baerecke-Limpricht clay pit	Specimens	Considered a synonym of Cyclotosaurus.	
Temnospondyli indet.	Indeterminate	Niederschönthal, Liestal	Specimens	Incertae sedis	

=== Therapsida ===
Genus	Species	Location	Material	Notes	Images
Eoraetia	E. siegerti	Baerecke-Limpricht clay pit	Isolated unla	Incertae sedis	
Thomasia	T. hahni	Baerecke-Limpricht clay pit	Teeth	A Haramiyidan	

=== Sauropterygia ===
Genus	Species	Location	Material	Notes	Images
Chelyoposuchus	C. crassisquamatus	Baerecke-Limpricht clay pit	Semiarticulated specimen	A Henodontidae placodont	
Placodontia indet.	Indeterminate	Niederschönthal, Liestal	Isolated remains	Incertae sedis	
Plesiosauria indet.	Indeterminate	Niederschönthal, Liestal	Limb bone	Can also be Nothosaur.	
"Plesiosaurus"	"P." keuperinus	Baerecke-Limpricht clay pit	Isolated vertebrae	Nomen dubium	

=== Archosauromorpha ===
Genus	Species	Location	Material	Notes	Images
"Chelyzoon"	cf."C." sp.	Baerecke-Limpricht clay pit	Complete neural arch of a thoracic vertebra and an isolated vertebral centrum	Other older specimens have been referred to Tanystropheus.	
Elachistosuchus	E. huenei	Baerecke-Limpricht clay pit	MB.R. 4520, which consists of six small blocks (I–VI) of bone-bearing rock	A possible basal Archosauromorph	Elachistosuchus specimen

=== Lepidosauria ===
Genus	Species	Location	Material	Notes	Images
Parvosaurus	P. harudensis	Baerecke-Limpricht clay pit	MB.R.4520.2 (holotype)	A sphenodontian	Parvosaurus specimen

=== Testudinata ===
Genus	Species	Location	Material	Notes	Images
Proganochelyidae indet.	Indeterminate	Heroldsberg, Feuerletten	UEN 549, piece of plastron; previously identified as possible dermal scute	Incertae sedis	
Proganochelys	P. quenstedtii	Baerecke-Limpricht clay pit; Heroldsberg, Feuerletten	MB 1910.45.2, skull and partial skeleton; multiple referred specimens	A basal Testudinatan. Includes the synonyms "Stegochelys dux" & "Triassochelys dux".	Proganochelys

=== Pseudosuchia ===
Genus	Species	Location	Material	Notes	Images
Aetosaur indet.	Indeterminate	Obere Mühle	Isolated cranial bones and osteoderms	Aetosaur	
Angistorhinopsis	A. ruetimeyeri	Niederschönthal, Liestal	Skull fragments, vertebrae, scutes and laterally compressed serrated teeth	A Phytosaur, known as "Mystriosuchus ruetimeyeri"	
Mystriosuchinae indet.	Indeterminate	"Phytosaur bonebed", Bitburg	Phytosaur bonebed: isolated tooth crowns, isolated broken tooth, possible osteoderm and other isolated fragments	Incertae sedis	
Mystriosuchus	M. planirostris	South of Göttingen	Teeth, Gastral rib, Osteoderms, Squamosum	A Phytosaur	Mystriosuchus
Mystriosuchus	M. spp.	Baerecke-Limpricht clay pit	Teeth, cranial and postcranial remains	A Phytosaur	Mystriosuchus
Nicrosaurus?	N.? spp.	South of Göttingen	Teeth	A Phytosaur.	Nicrosaurus

=== Pterosauria ===
Genus	Species	Location	Material	Notes	Images
Eudimorphodon	E. sp.	"Phytosaur bonebed", Bitburg	Isolated teeth	Eudimorphodontidae pterosaur	Eudimorphodon

=== Sauropodomorphs ===
Genus	Species	Location	Material	Notes	Images
Gresslyosaurus	G. ingens	Niederschönthal, Liestal	NMB BM 1, 10, 24, 53, 530–1, 1521, 1572–74, 1576–78, 1582, 1584–85, 1591	A Plateosaurid sauropodomorph	Gresslyosaurus material
Gresslyosaurus	G. torgeri	Baerecke-Limpricht clay pit	"Postcranial skeleton"	Indeterminate sauropodomorph remains. A referred skull was once known but has since been lost.	Gresslyosaurus material
Gresslyosaurus	G. robustus	Bebenhausen; Trossingen	GPIT-PV-60293; GPIT-PV-30786	Nomen dubium	Gresslyosaurus material
Gresslyosaurus	G. (P.?) plieningeri	Degerloch, Stuttgart	SMNS 80664	Nomen dubium	Gresslyosaurus material
Pachysauriscus	P. ajax	Trossingen; Wüstenrot	GPIT-PV-30790	A Plateosaurid sauropodomorph	
Pachysauriscus	P. wetzelianus	Trossingen	GPIT-PV-30788	Nomen dubium	
Pachysauriscus	P. giganteus	Trossingen	GPIT-PV-60234–60236	Nomen dubium	
Pachysauriscus	P. magnus	Pfrondorf, Tübingen	GPIT-PV-60298, 60173 to 60176, 60182	Nomen dubium	
Plateosauridae indet.	Indeterminate	Birnthon	BSP, partial ischium, specimen destroyed in WW2	Incertae sedis	
Plateosauridae indet.	Indeterminate	Diepersdorf	NHGN 5769, cervical rib, destroyed in WW2	Incertae sedis	
Plateosauridae indet.	Indeterminate	Behringersdorf	EN 565, distal left tibia, UEN 560, 564, ilium fragments. UEN 553, partial radius	Incertae sedis	
Plateosauridae indet.	Indeterminate	Hersbruck	Jaw and dental remains, held first in the BGLA and then the BSP, and destroyed in WW2	Incertae sedis	
Plateosauridae indet.	Indeterminate	Nuschelberg	NHGN 5771, rib fragment, 5755, partial left ischium, 5753, partial right humerus. All destroyed during WW2	Incertae sedis	
Plateosauridae indet.	Indeterminate	Pegnitztal	Two bones in collection of the "Seminary Prefect Fuss" (lost); UEN, sacral vertebra 3 (lost)	Incertae sedis	
Plateosaurus	P. erlenbergiensis	Erlenberg	"Partial skull and skeleton"	Nomen dubium	Plateosaurus specimens from Trossingen
Plateosaurus	P. longiceps	Baerecke-Limpricht clay pit	MB.R.1937	Includes "cf. Palaeosaurus? diagnosticus"	Plateosaurus specimens from Trossingen
Plateosaurus	P. engelhardti	Ellingen; Heroldsberg, Feuerletten	UEN 552, sacrum; UEN 550, caudal verteba, 551, chevron, 554/555, femur, 556, tibia, 557a-b, posterior dorsal, 558, caudal vertebra, 559, femoral head, 561, 562, middle dorsal vertebrae, 563a-c, middle dorsal rib. Missing pubis fragments and caudal vertebra	Nomen dubium	Plateosaurus specimens from Trossingen
Plateosaurus	P. trossingensis	Trossingen; Ellingen, "Am Tiergärtle"	At least 105 partial and complete skeletons	A Plateosaurid sauropodomorph. Material referred to "Plateosaurus engelhardti" is now referred to this species	Plateosaurus specimens from Trossingen
Plateosaurus	P. reinigeri	Degerloch	SMNS 53537	Nomen dubium	Plateosaurus specimens from Trossingen
Plateosaurus	P. quenstedti	Pfrondorf, Tübingen	GPIT-PV-60296	Nomen dubium	Plateosaurus specimens from Trossingen
Plateosaurus	P. sp.	Buchenbühl, Nürnberg; Röthenbach; Trossingen; Fuchsberg	Specimens #1, 4, 19, 23, 25, 26, 30, 34, 38, 40–42, 45, 49, 51, 52, 55, 56, 63; SMNS 81914, 91299, 91301, 91306; NHGN 5766, 5757, proximal and distal ends of right femur (destroyed in WW2); One sinistral femur	Indeterminate referral. Several of these may belong to "Plateosaurus engelhardti" (=P. trossingensis)	Plateosaurus specimens from Trossingen
Ruehleia	R. bedheimensis	Grossen Gleichberg, Römhild	HMN MB RvL 1, 2, 3, "Nearly complete skeleton, [two] incomplete skeletons, juvenile to adult".	A Plateosaurid sauropodomorph	Ruehleia
Sauropodomorpha indet.	Indeterminate	Allersberg, Feuerletten; Lauf; Kreuzgraben; Niederschönthal, Liestal	JM Keu 2001/1, left tibia. Other bones observed in field but not collected; BSPG 1959 I 518, proximal left tibia; NHGN postcranial material (vertebrae, tibia, partial fibula), destroyed during WW2; UEN, bone fragment in two pieces	Incertae sedis	
Tuebingosaurus	T. maierfritzorum	Trossingen	GPIT-PV-30787, a complete pelvis (three sacral vertebrae, two ilia, two pubes, two ischia), five anterior caudal vertebrae, four chevrons, left femur, left tibia, left and right fibulae, left astragalus, left calcaneum, metatarsal I, pedal fingers	A derived sauropodiform, previously attributed to P. plieningeri.	Know material of Tuebingosaurus

=== Theropods ===
Genus	Species	Location	Material	Notes	Images
Pterospondylus	P. trielbae	Baerecke-Limpricht clay pit	Known from a vertebra	Theropod remains of uncertain afinitty, suggested to be a Coelophysoidean.	Know material
Liliensternus	L. liliensterni	Grossen Gleichberg, Römhild	Two partial skeletons of subadults	A coelophysoid theropod formally named Halticosaurus liliensterni.	Liliensternus reconstruction
Liliensternus	L. sp.	Baerecke-Limpricht clay pit; Ellingen, "Am Tiergärtle"	scapula; Isolated material	A coelophysoid theropod formally named Halticosaurus liliensterni.	Liliensternus reconstruction
Liliensternus	L.? sp.	Ellingen, "Am Tiergärtle"	Cranial and postcranial remains of several presumably adult individuals	Represents a 7–9 m long stem-averostran closely related to or referable to Liliensternus	Liliensternus reconstruction
Liliensternus	cf. L. sp.	Heroldsberg, Feuerletten	UEN; proximal left metatarsal II (lost)	Incertae sedis	Liliensternus reconstruction

=== Flora ===
Genus	Species	Location	Material	Notes
Anapiculatisporites	A. spiniger	Wachsenburg near Gotha	Spore	Lycophyte spore, affinity with Lycopodiaceae
Agathoxylon	A. keuperianum	Konhalden/Dexelhof Maßstab	Wood/Charcoal	Araucariaceae
Aratrisporites	A. sp.	Wachsenburg near Gotha	Spore	Lycopsid spores, affinity with Pleuromeiaceae
Banksisporites	B. pinguis	Ellingen, "Am Tiergärtle"	Spore	Pleuromeiaceae
Brachysaccus	B. neomundanus	Wachsenburg near Gotha	Pollen	Conifer pollen, affinity with Pinaceae
Calamospora	C. tener	Wachsenburg near Gotha	Spore	Horsetail spore, affinity with Equisetales
Carnisporites	C. granulatus	Wachsenburg near Gotha	Spore	Probable Pteridophyte affinity
Cedripites	C. microreticulatus	Wachsenburg near Gotha	Pollen	Conifer pollen, affinity with Pinaceae
Clathropteris	C. meniscoides	Fuchsberg	Frond fragments	Dipteridaceae
Classopollis	C. simplex; C. torosus	Wachsenburg near Gotha	Pollen	Conifer pollen, affinity with Hirmeriellaceae
Corollina	C. sp.; C. zwolinskai	Wachsenburg near Gotha	Pollen	Conifer pollen, affinity with Hirmeriellaceae
Ctenozamites	C. cf. wolfiana	Fuchsberg	Leaf remains	Corystospermaceae?
Dictyophyllum	D. exile	Seinstedt	Frond remains	Dipteridaceae.
Enzonalasporites	E. vigens	Wachsenburg near Gotha	Pollen	Conifer pollen, affinity with Hirmeriellaceae
Equisetites	cf. E. munsteri	Baerecke-Limpricht	Stems	Horsetail, affinity with Equisetales
Eucommiidites	E. major	Wachsenburg near Gotha	Pollen	Gymnosperm, affinity with Erdtmanithecales
Granuloperculatipollis	G. rudis	Wachsenburg near Gotha; Malschenberg	Pollen	Conifer pollen, affinity with Hirmeriellaceae
Hirmeriella	H. muensteri	Fuchsberg	Shoots, male cones	Hirmeriellaceae (incl. material formerly labelled "Thuites schloenbachi")
Hughesisporites	H. cf. ionthus	Ellingen, "Am Tiergärtle"	Spore	Pleuromeiaceae or Isoetales
Hymenoreticulisporites	H. maedleri	Wachsenburg near Gotha	Spore	Affinity with Ophioglossales
Labiisporites	L. triassicus	Wachsenburg near Gotha	Spore	Lycophyte spore, affinity with Lycopodiaceae
Lepidopteris	L. ottonis	Seinstedt	Frond fragments	Peltaspermales.
Leptolepidites	L. sp.	Wachsenburg near Gotha	Pollen	Probable Pteridophyte affinity
Lycopodiacidites	L. frankonense	Wachsenburg near Gotha	Spore	Lycophyte spore, affinity with Lycopodiaceae
Neocalamites	N. lehmannianus; N. hoerensis	Seinstedt	Stem impressions	Neocalamiteceae. Material formerly labelled "Arundinites priscus" & "Calamites guembeli"
Neochomotriletes	N. triangularis	Wachsenburg near Gotha	Spore	Liverwort spores, affinity with Marchantiaceae
Nevesisporites	N. bigranulatus	Wachsenburg near Gotha	Spore	Liverwort spores, affinity with Marchantiaceae
Nilssonia	N?. sp.	Fuchsberg	Leaf fragments	Bennettitales?; macromorphology suggests Nilssonia rather than bennettitalean
Ovalipollis	O. molestus; O. pseudoalatus	Wachsenburg near Gotha	Pollen	Conifer pollen, affinity with Cupressales or Pinales
Paracirculina	P. scurrilis	Wachsenburg near Gotha	Pollen	Conifer pollen, affinity with Hirmeriellaceae
Paravesicaspora	P. planderovae	Wachsenburg near Gotha	Spore	Gymnosperm, affinity with Peltaspermales
Parillinites	P. callosus; P. pauper	Wachsenburg near Gotha	Pollen	Gymnosperm, affinity with Peltaspermales
Perinopollenites	P. sp.	Wachsenburg near Gotha	Pollen	Conifer pollen, affinity with Cupressales
Phlebopteris	P. angustiloba	Seinstedt	Frond remains	Matoniaceae
Podozamites	cf. P. distans	Baerecke-Limpricht	Branched shoots	A conifer, maybe Krassiloviaceae
Polycingulatisporites	P. reduncus	Wachsenburg near Gotha	Spore	Probable Pteridophyte affinity
Porcellispora	P. longdonensis	Wachsenburg near Gotha; Malschenberg	Spore	Probable Pteridophyte affinity
Ptilozamites	P. blasii; P. heeri	Seinstedt	Frond fragments	Corystospermaceae?
Retusotriletes	R. junior; R. mesozoicus	Wachsenburg near Gotha	Spore	Probable Pteridophyte affinity
Ricciisporites	R. tuberculatus	Wachsenburg near Gotha	Spore	Liverwort spores, affinity with Marchantiaceae
Taeniopteris/Marattia?	T. orientalis or M. intermedia	Seinstedt	Narrow elongated leaves	Pteridosperm or Marattiaceae (material formerly labelled "Oleandrium tenuinerve")
Triadispora	T. delicata; T. obscura; T. sp.	Wachsenburg near Gotha	Spore	Conifer pollen, affinity with Voltziales
Verrucosisporites	V. redactus	Wachsenburg near Gotha	Spore	Fern spores, linked with Osmundales
Vitreisporites	V. pallidus	Wachsenburg near Gotha	Pollen	Gymnosperm, affinity with Caytoniales
Voltziaceaesporites	V. heteromorphus	Wachsenburg near Gotha	Pollen	Conifer pollen, affinity with Voltziales

== See also ==
- List of dinosaur-bearing rock formations
- List of fossiliferous stratigraphic units in Germany
- List of fossiliferous stratigraphic units in Switzerland
