= Parahenodus =

Parahenodus Temporal range: Late Triassic, Carnian–Norian

Scientific classification
- Domain: Eukaryota
- Kingdom: Animalia
- Phylum: Chordata
- Class: Reptilia
- Superorder: †Sauropterygia
- Order: †Placodontia
- Family: †Henodontidae
- Genus: †Parahenodus; De Miguel Chaves, Ortega & Pérez‐García, 2018

Type species
- †Parahenodus atancensis De Miguel Chaves, Ortega & Pérez‐García, 2018

Extinct genus of reptiles

Parahenodus (meaning "near Henodus", with Henodus meaning "single tooth") is an extinct genus of henodontid placodont only known from a skull, discovered between 2008 and 2015 and described in 2018. It lived during the Late Triassic (Carnian–Norian). The skull, named and described as Parahenodus atancensis, was discovered in Keuper Facies of the Castilian Branche of the Iberian Range in the reservoir of El Atance (Sigüenza, Spain). It was the sister taxon to Henodus.
