= Chelyoposuchus =

Chelyoposuchus Temporal range: Late Triassic, 205.6–201.6 Ma

Scientific classification
- Domain: Eukaryota
- Kingdom: Animalia
- Phylum: Chordata
- Class: Reptilia
- Superorder: †Sauropterygia
- Order: †Placodontia
- Family: †Henodontidae
- Genus: †Chelyoposuchus; Kuhn, 1939

Type species
- †Chelyoposuchus crassisquamatus Kuhn, 1939

Synonyms
- Chelyposuchus Romer, 1966 (sic)

Extinct genus of reptiles

Chelyoposuchus is an extinct genus of henodontid placodont found at the Baerecke-Limpricht clay pit, Halberstadt, Germany. The type species, C. crassisquamatus, was named in 1939. It was found in the Knollenmergel Member of the Trossingen Formation, which dates to the late Rhaetian (205.6 - 201.6 Ma) and the holotype was collected by Otto Jaekel between 1909 and 1913.
