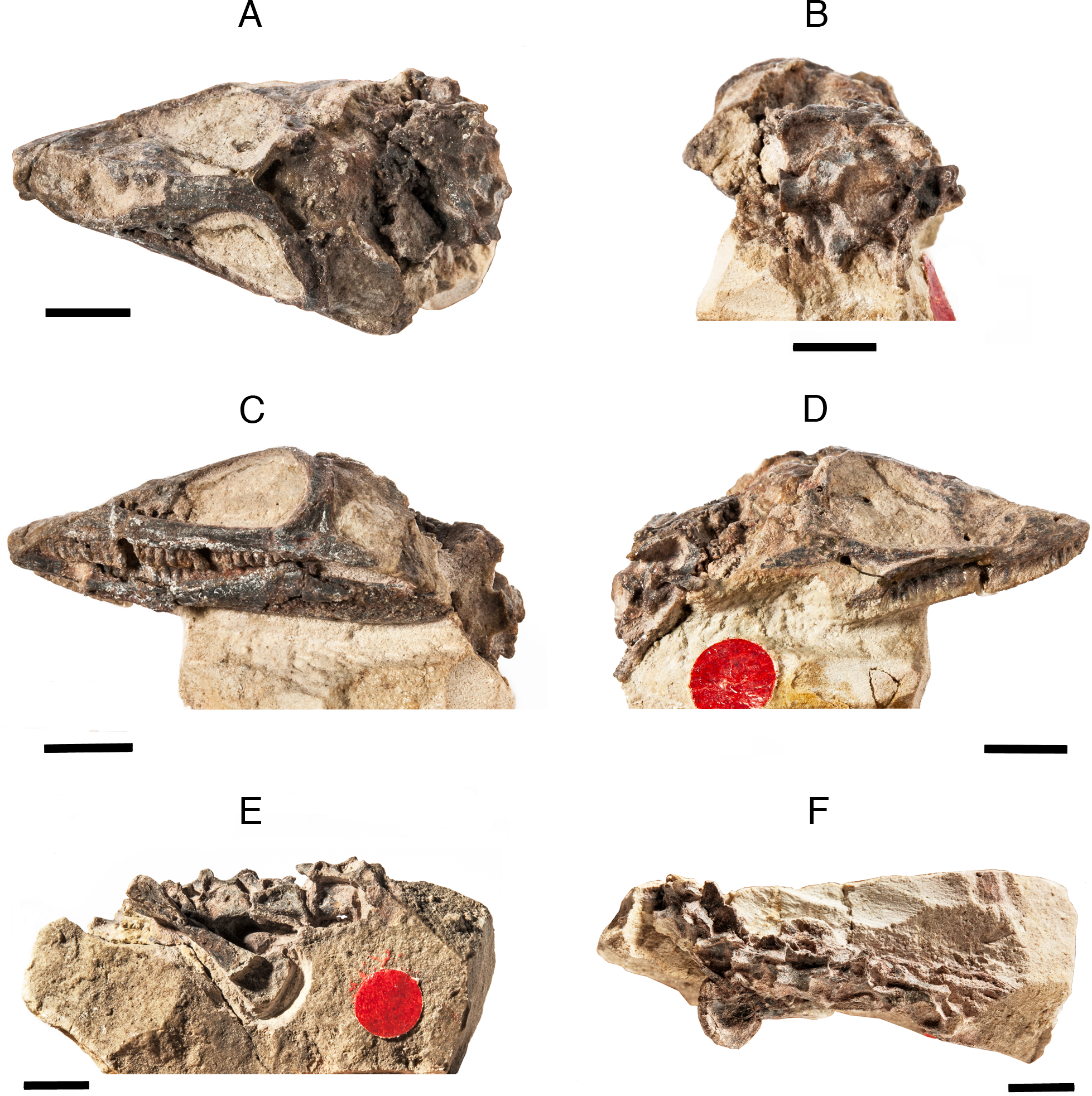
- Holotype skull, vertebrae and shoulder girdle (blocks I-II)

Scientific classification
- Kingdom: Animalia
- Phylum: Chordata
- Class: Reptilia
- Clade: Archosauromorpha
- Genus: †Elachistosuchus; Janensch, 1949

Type species
- †Elachistosuchus huenei Janensch, 1949

= Elachistosuchus =

Elachistosuchus Temporal range: Late Triassic, Norian

Extinct genus of reptiles

Elachistosuchus is an extinct genus of neodiapsid reptile, most likely basal archosauromorph, known from the Late Triassic Arnstadt Formation of Saxony-Anhalt, central Germany. It contains a single species, Elachistosuchus huenei, known from a single individual E. huenei, originally considered a pseudosuchian archosaur and then a rhynchocephalian lepidosaur, was largely ignored in the scientific literature, as its small size and fragility did not permit further mechanical preparation and examination. More recently however, a non-invasive μCT scanning was performed to resolve its placement within Reptilia, and found it to represent a more basal reptile, potentially closely related to several early archosauromorph clades.

== Discovery ==
Fossils of Elachistosuchus were first described and named by the German paleontologist Werner Janensch in 1949, with the type species being Elachistosuchus huenei. The generic name is derived from Greek ἐλάχιστος / elachistos, meaning "diminutive", and suchus, Latinized Greek souchos, an Egyptian crocodile god, in reference to the size of the holotype and its identification by Janensch as a pseudosuchian archosaur. The specific name huenei honors the German paleontologist Friedrich von Huene who greatly contributed to the study of various vertebrate groups, especially extinct reptiles.

Janensch described Elachistosuchus based on an associated partial skeleton of a single individual, the holotype MB.R. 4520, which consists of six small blocks (I–VI) of bone-bearing rock currently housed at the fossil reptile collection of the Berlin's Natural History Museum, in Germany. Block I preserves a nearly complete but crushed skull, while the right humerus associated with articulated vertebrae including the back portion of the neck and the front portion of the back with rib fragments are preserved in block II, along with shoulder girdle elements including the interclavicle, clavicles, coracoids and one scapula, first observed using μCT scanning. Blocks III to VI consist of fragments of ribs, isolated back vertebrae, and gastralia. MB.R. 4520 and additional unprepared material attributed to Elachistosuchus were found during the excavation of a skeleton of Plateosaurus around 1928. They were collected from a locality which lies along the present-day highway (Bundesstrasse) B79 between Halberstadt and Quedlinburg, on the southeastern edge of Halberstadt in Saxony-Anhalt, from a brick-clay pit unit of the Arnstadt Formation, dating to the middle to late Norian stage of the middle Late Triassic period. The site was initially excavated by Otto Jaekel between 1909 and 1912, and later Janensch conducted additional excavations there between 1923 and 1928. Except for smaller digs by A. Hemprich in 1937 and 1938, no further work has taken place since. The diverse Late Triassic biota from Halberstadt includes bivalves, crustaceans, chondrichthyans, dipnoans, temnospondyls, stem-turtles, phytosaurs, and a haramiyid mammal, as well as the sauropodomorph Plateosaurus, which is represented by some 50 specimens including at least two complete skeletons.

== Description ==
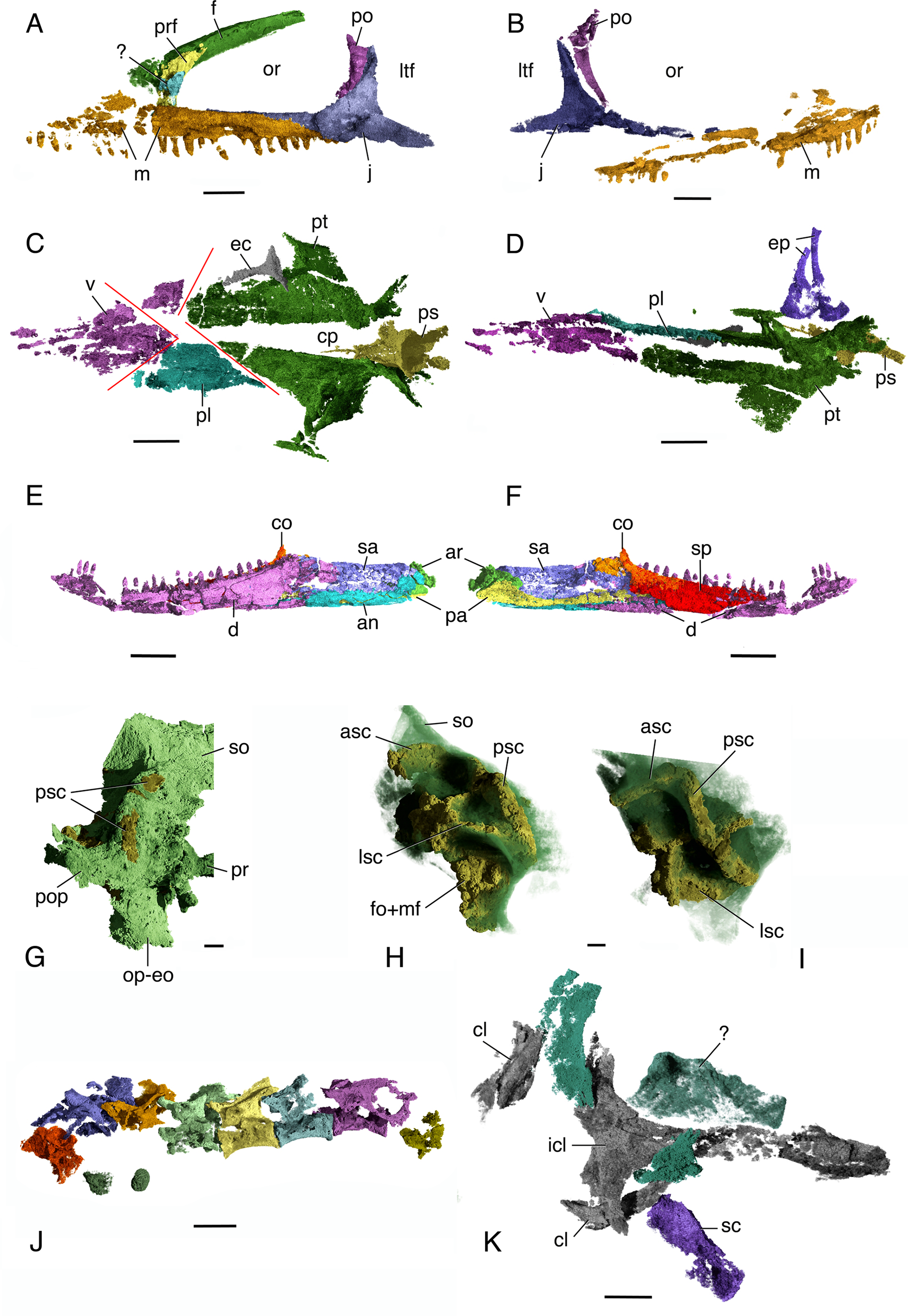
Segmented skull, vertebrae and shoulder girdle bones

Elachistosuchus was originally thought to be a pseudosuchian archosaur by Janensch (1949). Janensch diagnosed it among other pseudosuchians by its small body size, the lack of a specialized body plan, the presence of a large post-temporal fenestra, and what he believed to be an antorbital fenestra. Walker (1966) reinterpreted Elachistosuchus as a rhynchocephalian closely related to the only living genus Sphenodon (the tuatara) based on the long front portion of the jugal bone, the allegedly acrodont dentition, the large posttemporal fenestra, the absence of an external lower jaw fenestra, and a strongly twisted end of the humerus. Walker (1966) also argued that the antorbital fenestra identified by Janensch actually represented a damaged opening for the lacrimal canal.

Due to the small size and fragility of the holotype, further mechanical preparation is not possible, which caused Elachistosuchus to be largely ignored in the scientific literature. More recently however, a non-invasive μCT scanning allowed for the examination of MB.R. 4520 and assessment of much of its internal cranial structure. Additionally, the scan revealed previously unknown parts of the skeleton concealed in the matrix, specifically the braincase, palate, and parts of the shoulder girdle. Sobral, Sues and Müller (2015) provided a revised diagnosis for the species, based on these new observations. Elachistosuchus was considered by them to represent a small diapsid reptile, probably a basal archosauromorph (based on the results of several phylogenetic analyses), with a distinct back-side portion of the frontal bone, maxillary tooth row that extends behind the back margin of eye socket, a jugal bone with free back process, a palatine ramus of the pterygoid bone with shagreen of teeth, an angular bone exposed along about one third of the side surface of mandibular ramus, dichocephalous chest ribs, a notched front margin of the interclavicle, and a spoon-shaped back projection of the interclavicle.

== Phylogeny ==
The phylogenetic position of Elachistosuchus was explored by Sobral, Sues and Müller (2015) two recently constructed data matrix. Using Chen et al. (2014) data set, Elachistosuchus was recovered as the sister taxon of Choristodera, or in a polytomy with it. The two were recovered either as the basalmost archosauromorphs, or as a lepidosauromorphs which is more advanced than sauropterygians and their relatives. Using the Ezcurra et al. (2014) data set, Sobral, Sues and Müller (2015) found Elachistosuchus with Coelurosauravus just outside Sauria using parsimony, or alternatively as the basalmost archosauromorph (out of the included taxa), using the Bayesian approach. Although still uncertain, the phylogenetic position as broadly recovered by these analyses, rejects pseudosuchian and rhynchocephalian affinities for Elachistosuchus suggested by earlier studies. The two cladograms below shows simplified topologies recovered by Sobral, Sues and Müller (2015) when using the Bayesian approach for Chen et al. (2014) and Ezcurra et al. (2014), respectively (relations within bold terminal clades are not shown).

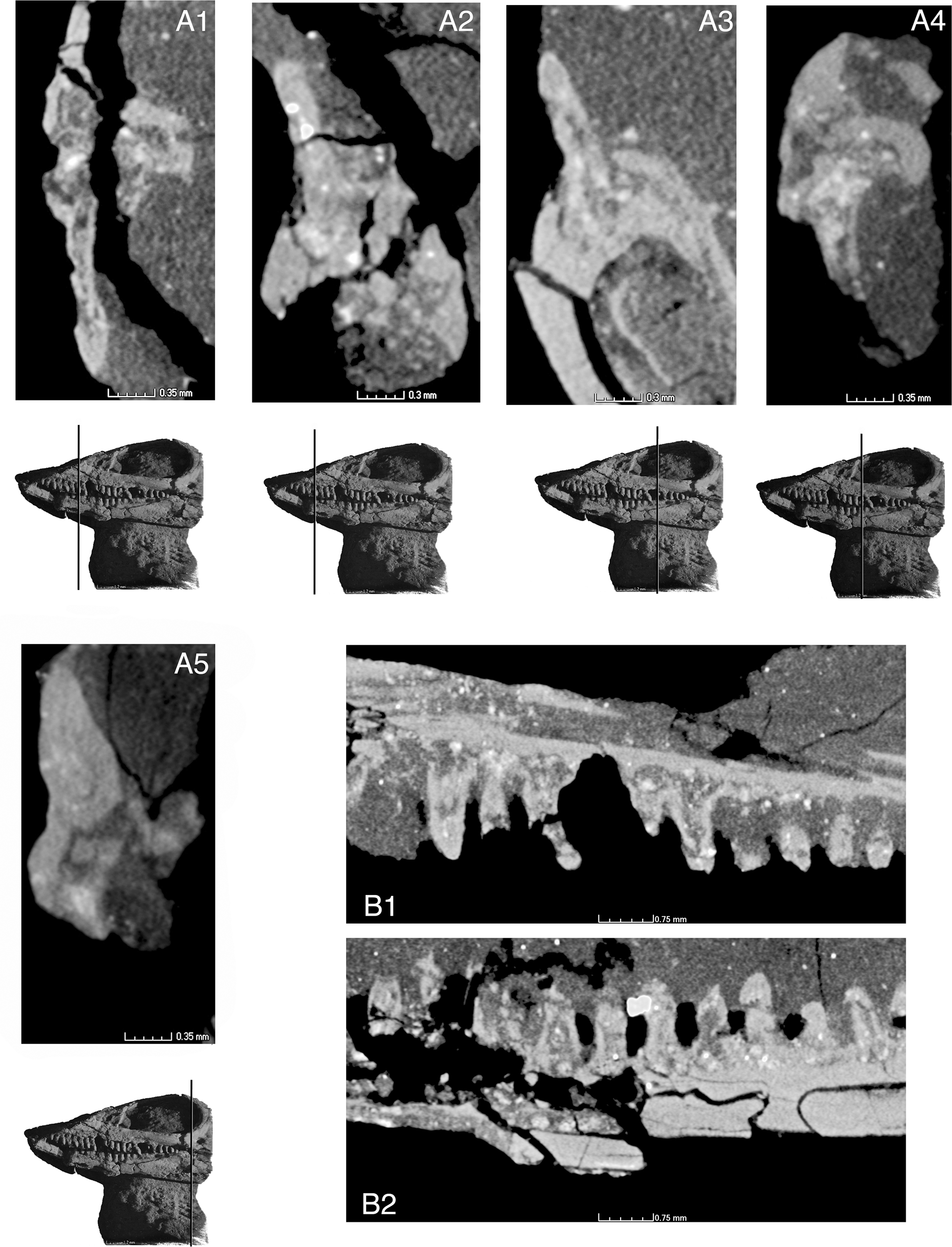
CT scans showing tooth details

- Diapsida
  - Araeoscelidia
  - - Orovenator
    - - Lanthanolania
      - - Youngina
        - - - Thadeosaurus
            - - Acerosodontosaurus
              - Hovasaurus
          - - Tangasaurus
            - - Claudiosaurus
              - Sauria
                - Archosauromorpha
                  - typical archosauromorphs
                  - - Thalattosauria
                    - - Wumengosaurus
                      - - Hupehsuchia
                        - Ichthyopterygia
                - Lepidosauromorpha
                  - - Helveticosaurus
                    - - Saurosphargidae
                      - Sauropterygia
                  - - - Elachistosuchus
                      - Choristodera
                    - - Coelurosauravus
                      - - - Pamelina
                          - Kuehneosauridae
                        - - Sophineta
                          - Lepidosauria

- Diapsida
  - Araeoscelidia
    - Araeoscelis
    - Petrolacosaurus
  - - Younginiformes
      - Acerosodontosaurus
      - Youngina
    - - Coelurosauravus
      - Sauria
        - Lepidosauromorpha
        - Archosauromorpha
          - Elachistosuchus
          - - Aenigmastropheus
            - - Protorosaurus
              - - Tanystropheidae
                  - Macrocnemus
                  - Tanystropheus
                - - Trilophosaurus
                  - - Rhynchosauria
                      - Mesosuchus
                      - - Noteosuchus
                        - Howesia
                    - - Prolacerta
                      - Archosauriformes
                        - Proterosuchidae
                          - Archosaurus
                          - Proterosuchus
                        - - Eorasaurus
                          - - Erythrosuchus
                            - Euparkeria
