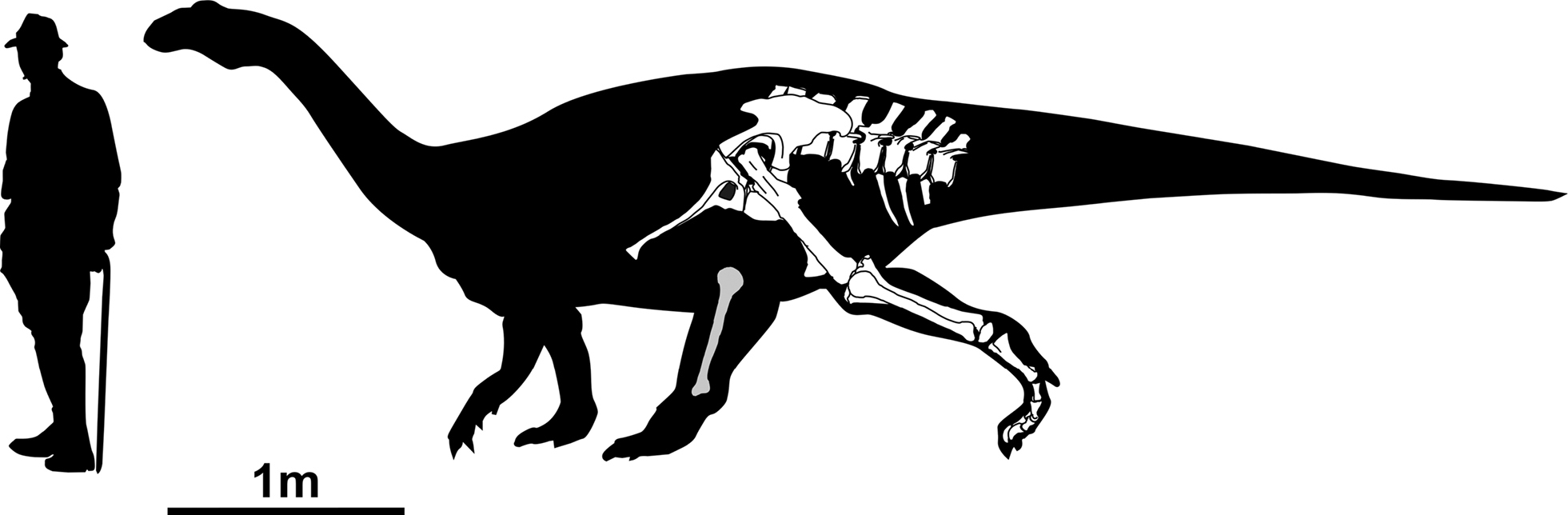
- Diagram showing known bones

Scientific classification
- Kingdom: Animalia
- Phylum: Chordata
- Class: Reptilia
- Clade: Dinosauria
- Clade: Saurischia
- Clade: †Sauropodomorpha
- Clade: †Massopoda
- Genus: †Tuebingosaurus; Regalado Fernández & Werneburg, 2022

Type species
- †Tuebingosaurus maierfritzorum Regalado Fernández & Werneburg, 2022

= Tuebingosaurus =

Tuebingosaurus Temporal range: Late Triassic (Norian), ~222–209 Ma

Extinct genus of dinosaurs

Tuebingosaurus (meaning "Tübingen lizard") is an extinct genus of massopodan sauropodomorph dinosaur from the Late Triassic Trossingen Formation of Germany. The genus contains a single species, Tuebingosaurus maierfritzorum, originally identified as a specimen of Plateosaurus.

== Discovery and naming ==
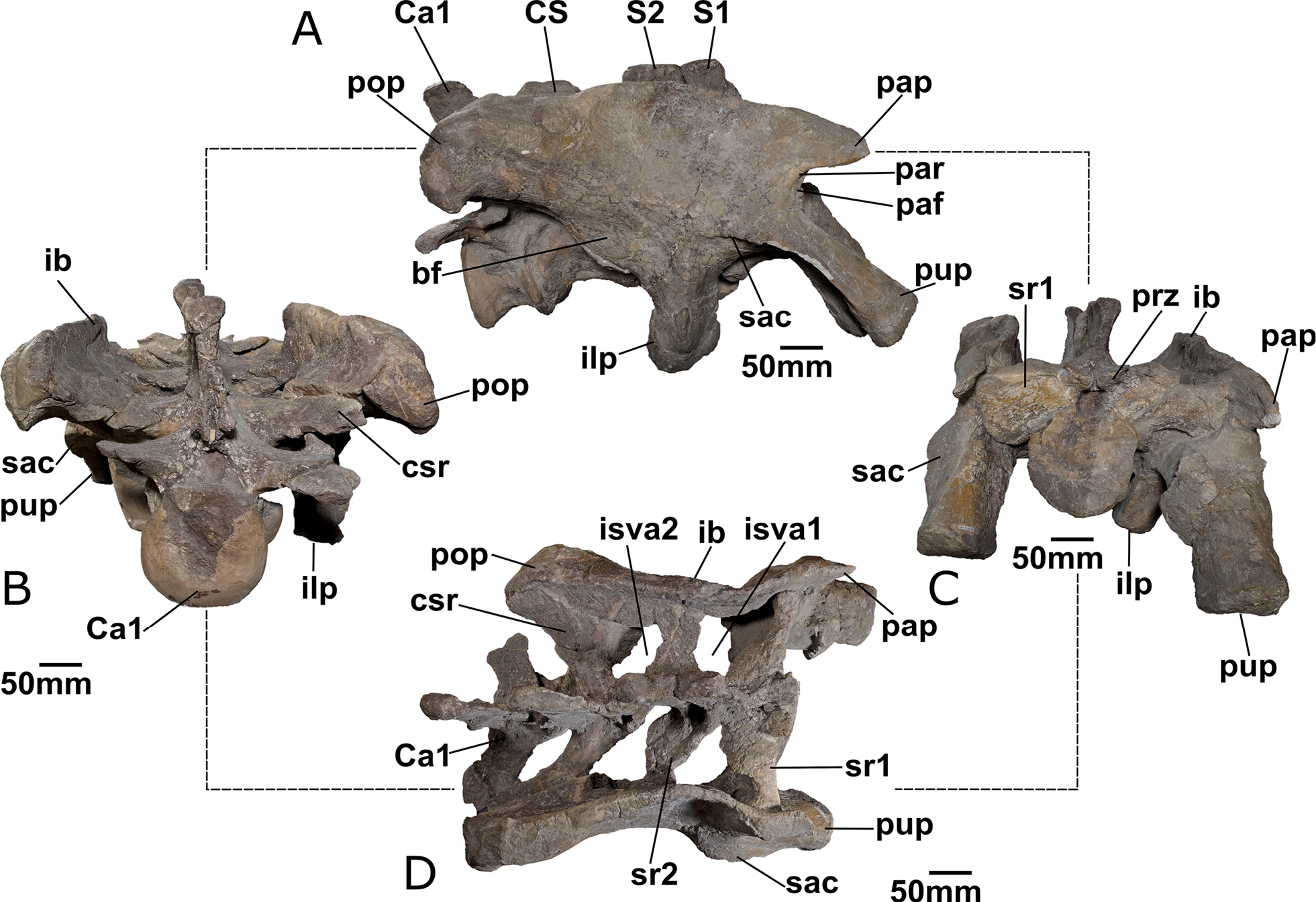
Holotype pelvis

The holotype, GPIT-PV-30787, also known as "GPIT IV", is a partial postcranial skeleton. It was discovered in 1922 and stored in the paleontological collection of the University of Tübingen. It was originally assigned to the species Gresslyosaurus plieningeri. Later, it was considered an exemplar of Plateosaurus, sometimes being used as reference materials for phylogenetic analyses using its name. However, it actually contains several features with more derived sauropodomorphs, which allowed it to be named as the distinct taxon Tuebingosaurus maierfritzorum in 2022. The generic name, "Tuebingosaurus", honors the city of Tübingen while the specific name, "maierfritzorum", refers to both Uwe Fritz and Wolfgang Maier; the former is an editor at the journal Vertebrate Zoology which hosted a Festschrift honoring Maier; its description was a part of this academic event.

In their 2025 review of Triassic reptile fossils from Germany, Sues & Schoch claimed that additional review of the holotype revealed that the characters used to distinguish Tuebingosaurus from other sauropodomorphs were based on damaged bones. As such, they regarded the species as a nomen dubium, pending additional research on the material.

== Classification ==
Although its describers only assigned it as a massopodan sauropodomorph, they also performed a phylogenetic analysis which placed it within the Sauropoda proper, possibly close to Schleitheimia.

== Paleoenvironment ==
The Trossingen Formation was originally interpreted as a synchronic deposit of animals, but is now considered to be a constant accumulation of mired carcasses that were deposited over hundreds of years by a river. Other specimens from this deposit include the theropod Liliensternus and several sauropodomorphs assigned to Plateosaurus and several associated names, which are in need of revision.
