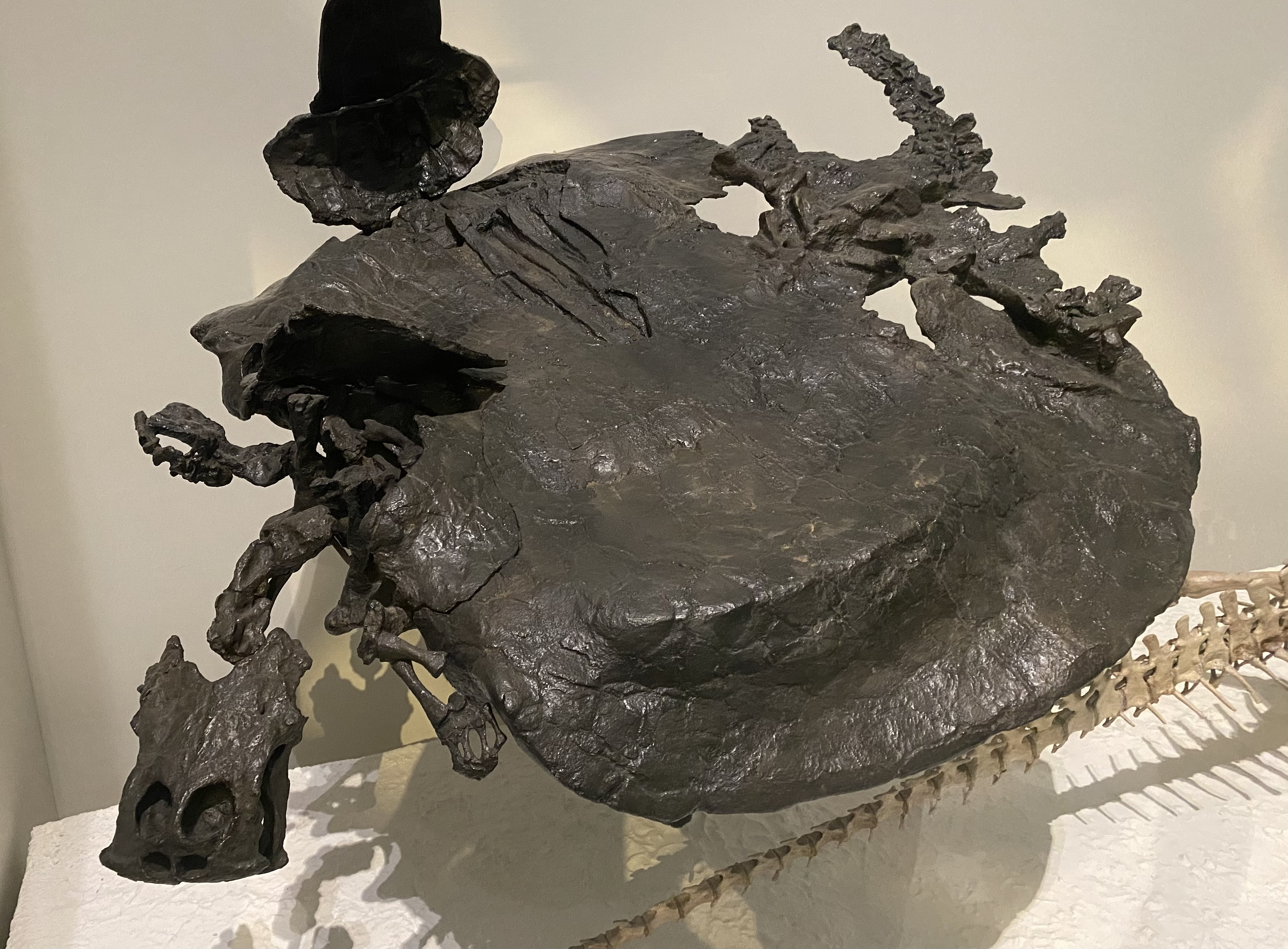
- Skeleton of Henodus at the American Museum of Natural History

Scientific classification
- Kingdom: Animalia
- Phylum: Chordata
- Class: Reptilia
- Superorder: †Sauropterygia
- Order: †Placodontia
- Family: †Henodontidae
- Genus: †Henodus; Huene, 1936
- Species: †H. chelyops

Binomial name
- †Henodus chelyops Huene, 1936

= Henodus =

Henodus Temporal range: Late Triassic, 237–227 Ma

Extinct species of reptile

Henodus (from Greek: ἑνός henós, 'one' and Greek: ὀδούς odoús, 'tooth') is an extinct placodont of the Late Triassic period during the early Carnian age. Fossils of Henodus chelyops were found in the Estherienschichten Member of the Grabfeld Formation, near Tübingen, Germany and Loulé, Portugal. It was around 1 metre (3.3 ft) in length. The single species within the genus is H. chelyops. Henodus is the only placodont thus far found in non-marine deposits, suggesting it may have lived in brackish or freshwater lagoons.

== Description ==
Henodus, like many other placodonts, had a superficial resemblance to a turtle. Like turtles, it had a shell formed from a plastron on the underside and a carapace on top. The carapace extended well beyond the limbs, and was made up of individual plates of bony scutes covered by plates of horn. However, the shell was composed of many more pieces of bone than that of turtles, forming a mosaic pattern. The armor was fused to its spine, and its limbs were situated in normal positions, unlike the turtle, where they are located inside the ribcage. The weak limbs of Henodus suggest it spent little, if any time on land.

Henodus also had a single tooth on each side of its mouth, though the remaining teeth were replaced by a beak. In addition, it had baleen-like denticles along the jaws, which combined with a unique feature of the hyoid and musculature indicative of rapid jaw closing, indicating suction feeding on plant material, which was then likely filtered out of the water using the baleen-like denticles. The head was squared-off at the front, just ahead of the eyes.

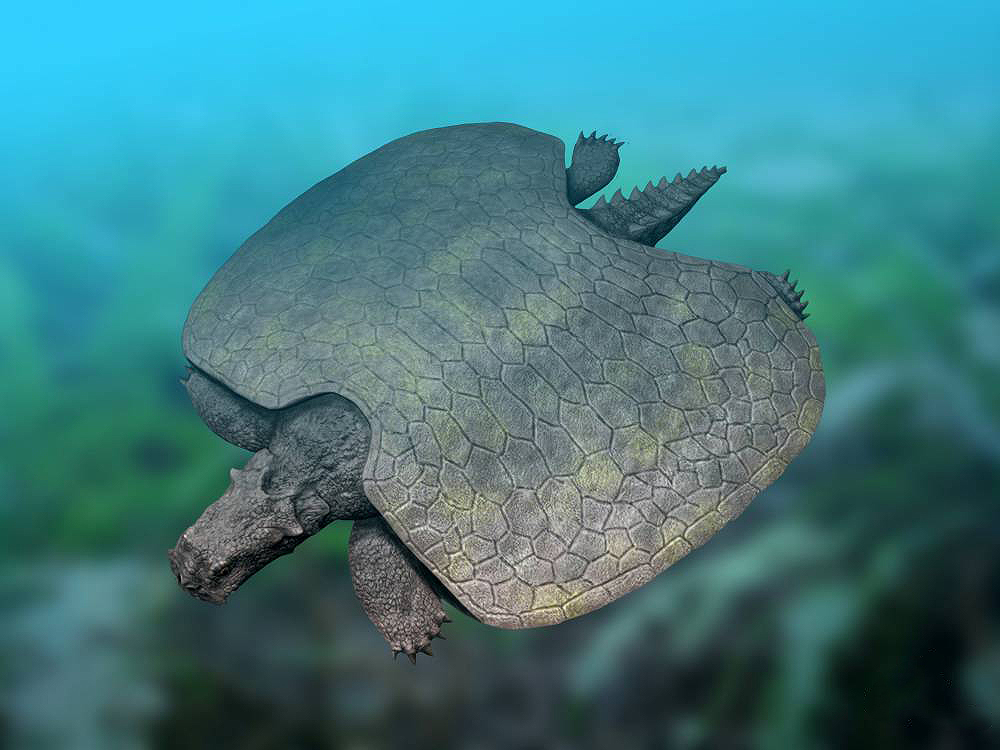
Artist's conception

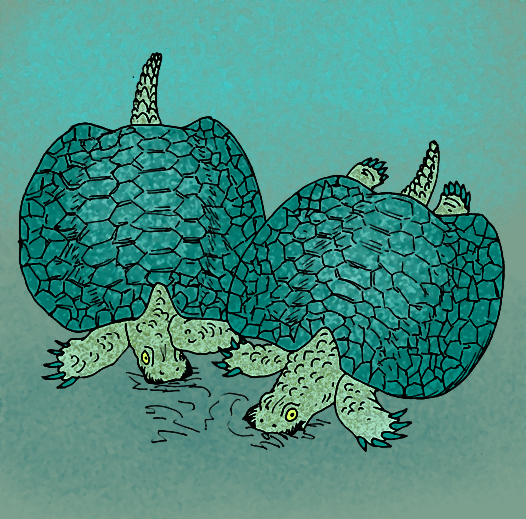
Reconstruction of filter feeding individuals

== Paleo-ecology ==
Based on its broad jaws, hyoid apparatus as well as ballen-like denticles, it has been suggested that this placodont was an aquatic herbivore and filter feeder. It would have scrapped off vegetation from the substrate with its broad jaws which would then have been sucked by expanding the throat. The baleen-like denticles would have subsequently been used to filter the food particles from the sediments and water drawn in. This feeding style is similar to what has been proposed for Atopodentatus, another Mesozoic aquatic reptile formerly suggested to be a filter-feeder and bearing strongly convergent jaw adaptations, including a similar "hammerhead" jaw tips.

In Portugal, Henodus was found in Silves Group, near the layers with Metoposaurus algarvensis, mastodonsaurids, and basal phytosaurs.
