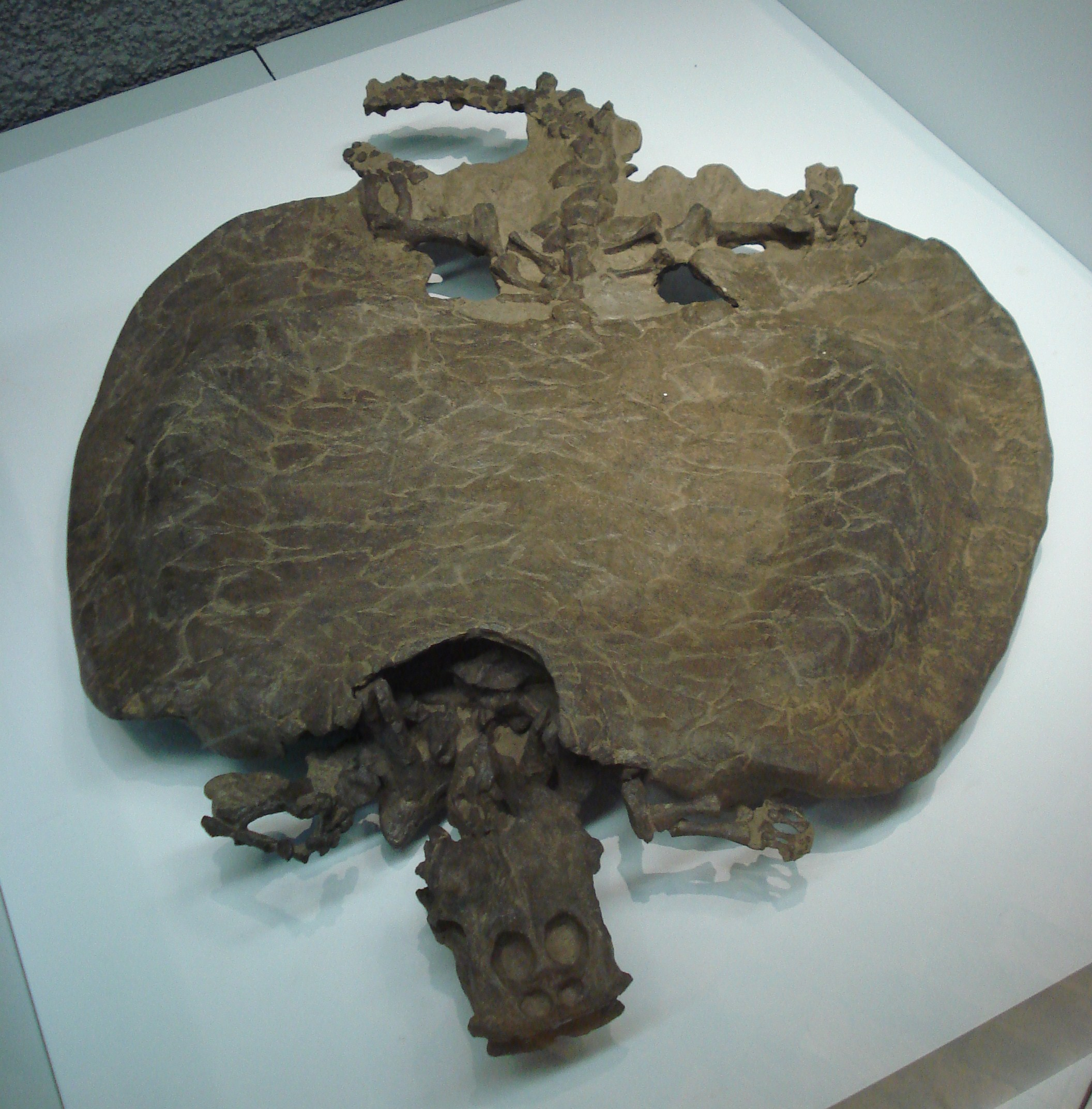
- Henodus fossil at University of Tübingen

Scientific classification
- Domain: Eukaryota
- Kingdom: Animalia
- Phylum: Chordata
- Class: Reptilia
- Superorder: †Sauropterygia
- Order: †Placodontia
- Superfamily: †Cyamodontoidea
- Family: †Henodontidae von Huene, 1936

Genera
- †Chelyoposuchus; †Henodus; †Parahenodus

= Henodontidae =

Henodontidae Temporal range: Late Triassic, Carnian–Rhaetian

Extinct family of reptiles

Henodontidae is an extinct family of superficially turtle-like placodonts belonging to the superfamily Cyamodontoidea. Fossils have been found in Germany and Spain.
