= Nilssonia =

Nilssonia may refer to:

- Nilssonia (turtle), a softshell turtle genus
- Nilssonia (plant), a form genus of Mesozoic leaf fossils
