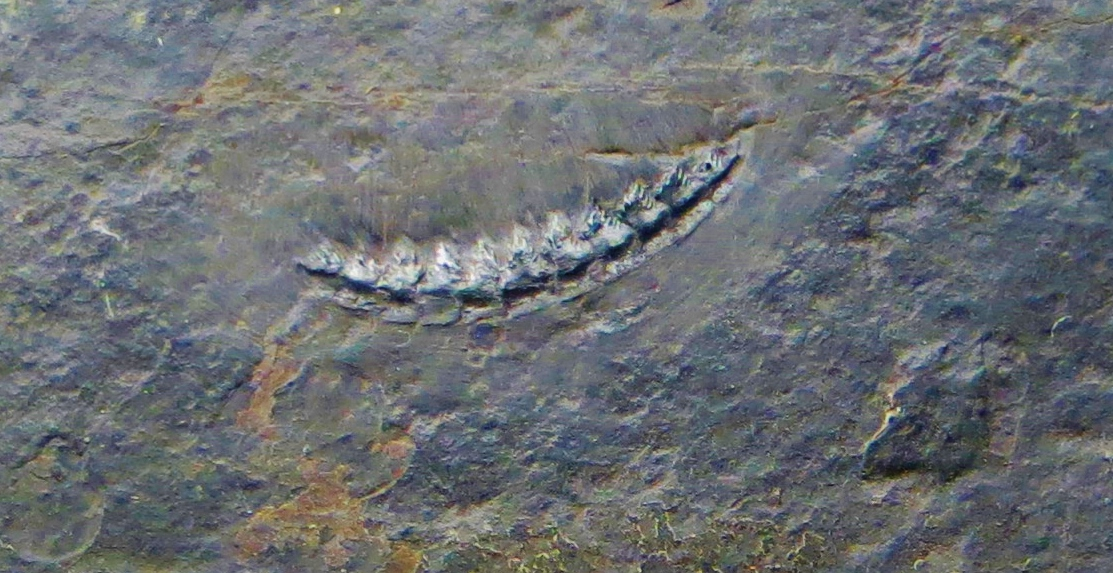
- Fossil of Pseudodalatias barnstonensis

Scientific classification
- Kingdom: Animalia
- Phylum: Chordata
- Class: Chondrichthyes
- Order: †Hybodontiformes
- Family: †Pseudodalatiidae; Reif, 1978
- Genus: †Pseudodalatias; Reif, 1978

Species
- Pseudodalatias barnstonensis (Sykes, 1971); Pseudodalatias henarejensis Botella et al., 2009

= Pseudodalatias =

Pseudodalatias Temporal range: Middle Triassic–Upper Triassic

Extinct genus of cartilaginous fishes

Pseudodalatias is an extinct genus of cartilaginous fish which existed in England, Italy and Spain during the Triassic period. It is placed in the monotypic family Pseudodalatiidae, and contains the two species Pseudodalatias barnstonensis and Pseudodalatias henarejensis. It is disputed as to whether it represents a neoselachian, or a hybodont.
